= List of villages in Lviv Oblast =

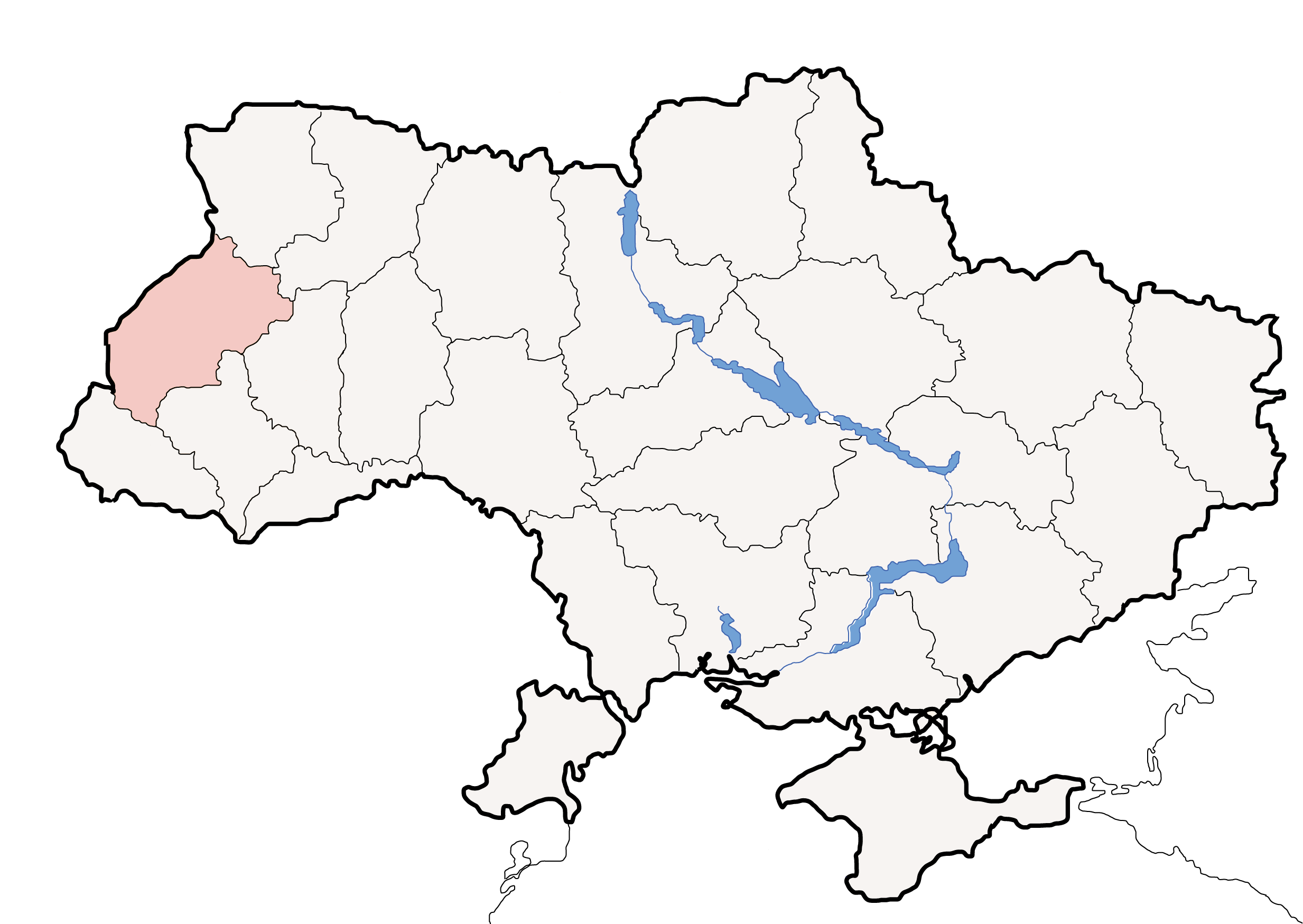
Location of Lviv Oblast in Ukraine.

The following is a list of villages in Lviv Oblast in Ukraine.

== Brody Raion (Бродівський район) ==
- Antosia
- Batkiv
- Byrlyn
- Biliavtsi
- Bovdury
- Boratyn
- Borduliaky
- Buchyna
- Velyki Perelisky
- Velyn
- Verbivchyk
- Vydra
- Vysotsko
- Vovkovatytsia
- Hai
- Hai-Ditkovetski
- Hai-Smolenski
- Hai-Sukhodilski
- Hlushyn
- Holoskovychi
- Holubytsia
- Horbali
- Horbanivka
- Hrymalivka
- Ditkivtsi
- Dubie
- Dubyna
- Dudyn
- Zharkiv
- Zabolotsi
- Zahirtsi
- Zalissia
- Zbrui
- Zvyzhen
- Kizia
- Klekotiv
- Kovpyn Stavok
- Komarivka
- Koniushkiv
- Korolivka
- Korsiv
- Kosarschyna
- Kuty
- Kutysche
- Lahodiv
- Leshniv
- Lypyna
- Lisove
- Litovysche
- Luhove
- Lukavets
- Lukashi
- Luchkivtsi
- Malynysche
- Mali Perelisky
- Mamchuri
- Markopil
- Mezhyhory
- Mykyty
- Mytnytsia
- Midne
- Monastyrok
- Nakvasha
- Nemiach
- Novychyna
- Orany
- Orykhivchyk
- Palykorovy
- Pankivtsi
- Pankova
- Peniaky
- Perelisky
- Pidhirtsi
- Pidhiria
- Pidkamin
- Pisky
- Ponykva
- Ponykovytsia
- Popivtsi
- Razhniv
- Ruda-Bridska
- Salashka
- Sydynivka
- Smilne
- Stanislavchyk
- Styborivka
- Strykhaliuky
- Sukhovolia
- Sukhodoly
- Sukhota
- Terebezhi
- Tetylkivtsi
- Trishchuky
- Chepeli
- Chernytsia
- Shyshkivtsi
- Shnyriv
- Shpaky
- Yablunivka
- Yazlivchyk
- Yaseniv
- Yasnysche

== Busk Raion (Буський район) ==
- Andriivka
- Bazhany
- Baymaky
- Baluchyn
- Bachka
- Bezbrody
- Bohdanivka
- Bolozhyniv
- Brahivka
- Budyholosh
- Verblyany
- Volytsya-Derevlyanska
- Voluyky
- Hayivske
- Horbachi
- Hrabyna
- Hrabova
- Humnyska
- Huta
- Hutysko-Turianske
- Dumnytsya
- Duniv
- Zhuratyn
- Zabolotne
- Zaboloto
- Zabrid
- Zavodske
- Chanyzh
- Chishki
- Kuty
- Lisok
- Lisove, Chanyzka village council
- Lisove, Toporivska village council
- Ostriv
- Perevolochna
- Pidstavky
- Pobuzhany
- Poltva
- Rusyliv
- Stovpyn
- Toporiv
- Turia
- Hvativ
- Tsykiv
- Chanyzh
- Chishky
- Chuchmany
- Yablunivka
- Yanhelivka

== Drohobych Raion (Дрогобицький район) ==
- Biinychi
- Bolekhivtsi
- Bronytsia
- Bykiv
- Bystryi
- Bystrytsia
- Bystrytsia-Hirska
- Daliava
- Derezhychi
- Dobrohostiv
- Dobrivliany
- Dolishnii Luzhok
- Dovhe
- Hlynne
- Holovske
- Horodkivka
- Hrushiv
- Huta
- Khatky
- Korosnytsia
- Korytyshche
- Kotovane
- Kryntiata
- Lastivka
- Letnia
- Lishnia
- Litynia
- Maidan
- Medvezha
- Modrychi
- Mokriany
- Monastyr-Derezhytskyi
- Monastyr-Lishnianskyi
- Nove Selo
- Mykhailevychi
- Nahuievychi
- Novoshychi
- Novyi Kropyvnyk
- Nyzhni Hai
- Opaka
- Opory
- Oriv
- Ortynychi
- Pereprostynia
- Pidmonastyrok
- Pidsukhe
- Pochaievychi
- Popeli
- Ranevychi
- Ripchytsi
- Rivne
- Roliv
- Rybnyk
- Selets
- Smilna
- Sniatynka
- Solonske
- Stanylia
- Stare Selo
- Storona
- Stupnytsia
- Svydnyk
- Tyniv
- Ulychne
- Uniatychi
- Urizh
- Verkhni Hai
- Verkhnii Dorozhiv
- Volia Yakubova
- Voloshcha
- Voroblevychi
- Vynnyky
- Yasenytsia-Silna
- Zady
- Zaluzhany
- Zalokot
- Zhdanivka
- Zubrytsia

== Horodok Raion (Городоцький район) ==
- Andriyaniv
- Artyschiv
- Bar
- Bartativ
- Berezets
- Bircza
- Bratkovychi
- Buchaly
- Velyka Kalinka
- Vyshnia
- Vovchukhy
- Volya-Bartativska
- Halychany
- Hodvyshnya
- Hrabyne
- Hradivka
- Hrimne
- Dobrjany
- Dolyniany
- Drozdovychy
- Dubanevychi
- Zabolottia
- Zavereshytsya
- Zavydovychi
- Zaluzhany
- Zaluzhzhya
- Zashkovychi
- Zelenyi Gay
- Zushytsi
- Katerynychi
- Kernytsia
- Klitsko
- Koropuzh
- Kosivets
- Lytovka
- Livchytsi
- Lisnovychi
- Lyubovychi
- Mavkovychi
- Malyi Lubin
- Malovanka
- Mylchitsі
- Mylyatyn
- Moloshky
- Monastyrets
- Mosty
- Mshana
- Nove Selo
- Palanyky
- Peremozhne
- Pidzvirynets
- Pidmohylka
- Pisky
- Poberezhne
- Povitno
- Polyana
- Porichchya
- Porichchya Zadvirne
- Porichchya-Hruntove
- Putyatychi
- Rechychany
- Rodatychi
- Romanivka
- Stodilky
- Suhovolya
- Tataryniv
- Tershakiv
- Tulyholove
- Tuchapy
- Uhry
- Hyshevychi
- Cherlyany
- Cherlyanske Peredmistya
- Chulovychi
- Sholomynychi
- Yakymchytsi
- Yaremkiv

== Kamianka-Buzka Raion (Кам'янка-Бузький район) ==
- Banyunyn
- Batyatychi
- Velyke Kolodno
- Velyki Pidlisky
- Vyriv
- Dolyny
- Dolyny
- Zheldets
- Zhovtantsi
- Novyy Stav
- Obydiv
- Perekalky
- Pechyhvosty
- Spas
- Stavnyky
- Staryy Dobrotvir
- Staryy Yarychiv
- Yakymiv
- Yamne

== Mostyska Raion (Мостиський район) ==
- Arlamivska Volya
- Balychi
- Berehove
- Bertsi
- Bykiv

== Mykolaiv Raion (Миколаївський район) ==
- Berezdivtsi
- Berezyna
- Bilche
- Bolonya
- Brodky
- Ternopillja
- Velyka Volya
- Velyka Horozhanna
- Verbizh
- Veryn
- Derzhiv

== Peremyshliany Raion (Перемишлянський район) ==
- Bachiv
- Bile
- Bilka
- Blahodativka
- Bolotnya
- Borschiv
- Brykun
- Bryukhovychi
- Velyki Hlibovychi
- Hlibovychi
- Dobryanychi
- Dunaiv
- Dusaniv
- Lopushna
- Univ

== Pustomyty Raion (Пустомитівський район) ==
- Basivka
- Berehy
- Berezhany
- Borschovychi
- Budkiv
- Verhnya Bilka
- Vynnychky
- Hodovytsia
- Konopnytsia
- Obroshyne
- Rakovets
- Stavchany
- Stare Selo
- Suhorichchya
- Sholomyn

== Radekhiv Raion (Радехівський район) ==
- Adamivka
- Andriyivka
- Babychi
- Baryliv
- Batyyiv
- Bebehy
- Berezivka
- Byshiv
- Volytsya
- Volytsya-Barylova
- Vuzlove
- Hoholiv
- Novyy Vytkiv
- Novostavtsi
- Obortiv
- Ohlyadiv
- Oplitsko
- Ordiv
- Pavliv
- Pyratyn
- Pidmonastyrok
- Smorzhiv
- Stoianiv
- Stremilche

== Sambir Raion (Самбірський район) ==
- Babyna
- Baranivtsi
- Berehy
- Berezhnytsya
- Berestyany
- Biloky
- Birchytsi
- Biskovychi
- Blazhiv
- Vankovychi
- Vanovychi
- Velyka Bilyna
- Velyka Ozymyna
- Velyka Hvoroscha
- Verbivka
- Verhivtsi
- Vykoty
- Vilshanyk
- Vistovychi
- Vladypil
- Volytsya
- Volya-Baranetska
- Volya-Blazhivska
- Volyanka
- Voschantsi
- Voyutychi
- Hlyboch
- Hordynya
- Horodysche
- Dolobiv
- Dubrivka
- Zahirya
- Zahirya
- Zadnistrya
- Zadnistryany
- Zaluzhany
- Zarayske
- Zarichchya
- Zarichchya, Biskovytsia rural hromada, Zarichchya
- Zvir
- Kalyniv
- Kanafosty
- Klymivschyna
- Kovynychi
- Kolbayevychi
- Koloniya
- Konyushky-Korolivski
- Konyushky-Tulyholivski
- Kopan
- Kornalovychi
- Kornychi
- Krasnytsya
- Kruzhyky
- Krukovets
- Kulchytsi
- Kupnovychi
- Lanovychi
- Lopushno
- Luka
- Lukavytsya
- Luky
- Maynych
- Maksymovychi
- Mala Bilyna
- Mala Verbivka
- Mala Ozymyna
- Mala Sprynka
- Mala Hvoroscha
- Malyniv
- Mali Baranivtsi
- Myhaylevychi
- Mizhhaytsi
- Mistkovychi
- Mlyn
- Monastyrets
- Nahirne
- Nyzhnye
- Nyklovychi
- Novyy Ostriv
- Novi Birchytsi
- Novosilky-Hostynni
- Orhovychi
- Ostriv
- Pyniany
- Pidhaychyky
- Pohirtsi
- Podiltsi
- P'ianovychi
- Ralivka
- Rohizno
- Rozdilne
- Rudnya
- Sadkovychi
- Side
- Sprynia
- Strilkovychi
- Susoliv
- Tarava
- Troyany
- Hatky
- Hlopchytsi
- Chaykovychi
- Chernyhiv
- Cherhava
- Chukva
- Sheptychi
- Yazy

== Skole Raion (Сколівський район) ==
- Verkhnia Rozhanka
- Verkhniachka
- Volosyanka
- Holovetsko
- Hrabovets
- Hrebeniv
- Dovzhky
- Dolynivka
- Dubyna
- Zhupany
- Zavadka
- Zadilske
- Zymivky
- Kalne
- Kamianka
- Klymets
- Kozyova
- Korostiv
- Korchyn
- Kryve
- Krushelnytsya
- Lavochne
- Lybohora
- Mezhybrody
- Muta
- Nahirne
- Nyzhnie Synovydne
- Nyzhnia Rozhanka
- Oporets
- Oriv
- Oriava
- Oryavchyk
- Pidhorodtsi
- Plavie
- Pobuk
- Pohar
- Pshonets
- Rykiv
- Rosokhach
- Smozhe
- Sopit
- Sukhyi Potik
- Ternavka
- Tysovets
- Tyshivnytsya
- Trukhaniv
- Tukhlya
- Tukholka
- Urych
- Khaschovania
- Khitar
- Yalynkuvate
- Yamelnytsya

== Sokal Raion (Сокальський район) ==
- Bendyuha
- Berezhne
- Birky
- Bob'iatyn
- Bodyachiv
- Borove
- Boryatyn
- Boyanychi
- Butyny
- Vaniv
- Varyazh
- Velyke
- Kariv
- Knyazhe
- Komariv
- Konotopy
- Kopytiv
- Korchiv
- Kulychkiv
- Ravschyna
- Reklynets
- Romanivka
- Romosh
- Royatyn
- Tudorkovychi

== Staryi Sambir Raion (Старосамбірський район) ==
- Babyno
- Bachyna
- Bereziv
- Byblo
- Bylychi
- Bilychi
- Boloziv
- Bonevychi
- Borshevychi
- Bukova
- Bunkovychi
- Busovysko
- Velyka Volosyanka
- Velyka Linyna
- Velyka Sushytsya
- Velyke
- Velykosillya
- Verhniy Luzhok
- Vytsiv
- Vilyunychi
- Voloshynovo
- Volya
- Halivka
- Hvozdets
- Hlyboka
- Holovetsko
- Horodysko
- Horodovychi
- Hrabivnytsya
- Hrozovo
- Hrushatychi
- Hubychi
- Humanets
- Deshychi
- Dnistryk
- Drozdovychi
- Zavadka
- Zarichchya
- Zasadky
- Zorotovychi
- Ivaniv
- Katyna
- Knyazhpil
- Koblo
- Komarovychi
- Koniv
- Kropyvnyk
- Lavriv
- Lopushanka Homyna
- Lopushnytsya
- Lyutovyska
- Maksymivka
- Mihovo
- Mizhenets
- Morozovychi
- Murovane
- Mshanets
- Nadyby
- Nedilna
- Nyzhnya Vovcha
- Nove Misto
- Pavlivka
- Patskovychi
- Peredilnytsya
- Pidmostychi
- Ploske
- Polyana (Slohynivska village council)
- Polyana (Ternavska village council)
- Posada-Novomiska
- Potik
- P'yatnytsya
- Raynova
- Rakova
- Rip'yana
- Rozheve
- Rosohy
- Sanochany
- Skelivka
- Slyvnytsya
- Slohyni
- Smerechka
- Sozan
- Solyanuvatka
- Sosnivka
- Spas
- Stara Ropa
- Staryava
- Storonevychi
- Strashevychi
- Strilky
- Strilbychi
- Susidovychi
- Sushytsya
- Tarnavka
- Tvari
- Terlo
- Ternava
- Tershiv
- Tysovytsya
- Tyha
- Tovarna
- Topilnytsya
- Torhanovychi
- Torchynovychi
- Trushevychi
- Tur'ye
- Chapli
- Chyzhky
- Shumyna
- Yasenytsya Zamkova

== Stryi Raion (Стрийський район) ==
- Banja Lysovytska
- Berezhnytsya
- Bratkivtsi
- Velyki Didushychi
- Verhnya Lukavytsya
- Verhnya Stynava
- Verchany
- Vivnya
- Volya-Dovholutska
- Volya-Zaderevatska
- Hayduchyna
- Girne
- Holobutiv
- Gorishne
- Hrabovets
- Dibrova
- Dobrivlyany
- Dobriany
- Dovhe
- Dovholuka
- Dolishne
- Duliby
- Zhulyn
- Zavadiv
- Zahirne
- Zaderevach
- Zaplatyn
- Zarichne
- Yosypovychi
- Kavske
- Kolodnytsya
- Komariv
- Konyuhiv
- Kuty
- Lany-Sokolivsky
- Lanivka
- Lysovychi
- Lysiatychi
- Lotatnyky
- Lug
- Lyubyntsi
- Mali Didushychi
- Myrtyuky
- Monastyrets
- Nezhukhiv
- Nyzhnia Lukavytsya
- Nyzhnia Stynava
- Oleksychi
- Pyla
- Pidgirtsi
- Pishchany
- Podorozhnye
- Pukenychi
- Piatnychany
- Rayliv
- Rozhirche
- Semyhyniv
- Syhiv
- Slobidka
- Smolyanyy
- Stankiv
- Stryhantsi
- Strilkiv
- Uhersko
- Uhilnya
- Falysh
- Hodovychi
- Hromohorb
- Schaslyve
- Yarushychi

== Turka Raion (Турківський район) ==
- Bahnuvate
- Beniova
- Berezhok
- Bitlia
- Boberka
- Bukovynka
- Dnistryk-Dubovyi
- Haschiv
- Holovske
- Ilnyk
- Isai
- Ivashkivtsi
- Karpatske
- Kindrativ
- Komarnyky
- Korytysche
- Krasne
- Kryntyata
- Kryvka
- Lastivka
- Liktiv
- Limna
- Lopushanka
- Losynets
- Lybohora
- Mala Volosyanka
- Matkiv
- Melnychne
- Mezhyhir'ya
- Mohnate
- Nyzhnye
- Nyzhnye Husne
- Nyzhniy Turiv
- Nyzhnye Vysotske
- Nyzhnya Yablunka
- Pryslip
- Radych
- Ropavske
- Rozluch
- Rykiv
- Stodilka
- Shandrovets
- Shtukovets
- Shum'yach
- Sianky
- Svydnyk
- Syhlovate
- Verkhne
- Verkhne Vysotske
- Verkhne Husne
- Verkhnia Jablunka
- Verkhniy Turiv
- Vovche
- Yabluniv
- Yasenytsya
- Yasenka-Stetsova
- Yavora
- Yavoriv
- Zakychera
- Zakiptsi
- Zarichchya
- Zavadivka
- Zhukotyn
- Zvorets
- Zubrytsya

== Zhovkva Raion (Жовківський район) ==
- Artasiv
- Babiyi
- Berezyna
- Besidy
- Byshkiv
- Birky
- Bir-Kunynskyy
- Velykyy Doroshiv
- Velyki Hrybovychi
- Velyki Dolyny
- Velyki Peredrymyhy
- Horodzhiv
- Zamok
- Zamochok
- Zarysche
- Zarudtsi
- Maydan
- Malekhiv
- Malyy
- Malyy Doroshiv
- Mali Hrybovychi
- Mali Dolyny
- Mali Peredrymyhy
- Nova Skvariava
- Nove Selo
- Okopy
- Oliyarnyky

== Zhydachiv Raion (Жидачівський район) ==
- Antonivka
- Bakivtsi
- Berezhnytsya
- Berezyna
- Bertyshiv
- Borynychi
- Borodchytsi
- Bortnyky
- Borusiv
- Bryntsi-Zahirni
- Bryntsi-Tserkovni
- Bukovina
- Buyaniv
- Verbytsya
- Vybranivka
- Vilhivtsi
- Vovchatychi
- Volytsya-Hnizdychivska
- Volodymyrtsi
- Volya-Oblaznytska
- Hannivtsi
- Holdovychi
- Holeshiv
- Horodysche
- Horodyschenske
- Hrusyatychi
- Dev'yatnyky
- Demydiv
- Demivka
- Dem'yanka-Lisna
- Dem'yanka-Naddnistrianska
- Dobrivlyany
- Drohovychi
- Dubravka
- Duliby
- Dunayets
- Zhyrivske
- Zhyrova
- Zhuravkiv
- Zabolotivtsi
- Zahirochko
- Zahrabivka
- Zahurschyna
- Zakryvets
- Zalisky
- Zarichne
- Zarichchya
- Ivanivtsi
- Kalynivka
- Kam'yane
- Kvitneve
- Kniselo
- Kolohory
- Kornelivka
- Korolivka
- Korchivka
- Kotoryny
- Krehiv
- Lapshyn
- Lyskiv
- Livchytsi
- Liniya
- Lischyny
- Luchany
- Lyubsha
- Lyutynka
- Mazurivka
- Marynka
- Makhlynets
- Mezhyrichchya
- Melnych
- Mlynyska
- Molodynche
- Molotiv
- Monastyrets
- Nove Selo
- Novosiltsi
- Novoshyny
- Oblaznytsya
- Orishkivtsi
- Otynevychi
- Piddnistryany
- Pidlisky
- Podorozhnye
- Pokrivtsi
- Prybillya
- Protesy
- Pchany
- P'yatnychany
- Repehiv
- Rohizno
- Romanivka
- Ruda
- Rudkivtsi
- Sadky
- Seniv
- Sydorivka
- Smohiv
- Sokolivka
- Stare Selo
- Stari Strilyscha
- Suhriv
- Sulyatychi
- Teysariv
- Ternavka
- Trybokivtsi
- Turady
- Hodorkivtsi
- Cheremhiv
- Chertizh
- Chyzhychi
- Chornyi Ostriv
- Yushkivtsi

== Zolochiv Raion (Золочівський район) ==
- Bibschany
- Bilyy Kamin
- Bir
- Bohutyn
- Bonyshyn
- Bortkiv
- Buzhok
- Velyka Vilshanytsya
- Velykyy Polyuhiv
- Verhobuzh
- Vyzhnyany
- Voronyaky
- Havarechchyna
- Holohirky
- Holohory
- Honcharivka
- Horodyliv
- Hrabovo
- Hutysche
- Derev'yanky
- Yelyhovychi
- Zheniv
- Zhukiv
- Zhulychi
- Zahora
- Zalissya
- Zastavne
- Zashkiv
- Zozuli
- Zolochivka
- Kam'yanyste
- Kyykiv
- Knyazhe
- Kobylechchyna
- Kozaky
- Koltiv
- Kopani
- Koropets
- Koropchyk
- Kosychi
- Krasnosiltsi
- Kryvychi
- Kropyvna
- Kruhiv
- Kulby
- Kurovychi
- Lisovi
- Luh
- Luka
- Maziv
- Maydan-Holohirskyy
- Mala Vilshanka
- Mahnivtsi
- Mytulyn
- Monastyrok
- Nadilne
- Nestyuky
- Novoselysche
- Novosilky
- Obertasiv
- Opaky
- Osovytsya
- Papirnya
- Perehnoyiv
- Pecheniya
- Pidhaychyky
- Pidhir'ya
- Pidhorodne
- Pidlyptsi
- Pidlyssia
- Pisok
- Pluhiv
- Pobich
- Pohoriltsi
- Polyany
- Pochapy
- Remezivtsi
- Rozvazh
- Rozvoryany
- Rozdorizhne
- Ruda
- Ruda-Koltivska
- Sasiv
- Skvaryava
- Sknyliv
- Slovita
- Snovychi
- Solova
- Stadnya
- Stinka
- Strutyn
- Torhiv
- Trostyanets
- Trudovach
- Turkotyn
- Ushnya
- Hylchytsi
- Hmeleva
- Homets
- Chervone
- Cheremoshnya
- Chyzhiv
- Shopky
- Shpykolosy
- Yaktoriv
- Yasenivtsi

== Yavoriv Raion (Яворівський район ) ==
- Berdyhiv
- Birky
- Bozha Volia
- Borysy
- Brozhky
- Buda
- Buniv
- Vahuly
- Velyki Hory
- Velyki Makary
- Velykopole
- Verbliany
- Vereschytsya
- Verhutka
- Vysich
- Vizhomlia
- Viytivschyna
- Vovcha Hora
- Volia
- Volya Lyubynska
- Volia-Dobrostanska
- Volia-Starytska
- Voroblyachyn
- Vorotsiv
- Hlynets
- Hlynytsi
- Horaiets
- Hrushiv
- Datsky
- Debri
- Dernaky
- Dibrova
- Dobrostany
- Domazhyr
- Drohomyshl
- Dubrovytsia
- Zhornyska
- Zavadiv
- Zadebri
- Zaluzhzhia
- Zarubany
- Zatoka
- Zeliv
- Ivanyky
- Kalynivka
- Kalytyaky
- Kamianobrid
- Karachyniv
- Karpy
- Kachmari
- Kertyniv
- Kovali
- Kohuty
- Kozhychi
- Kolonytsi
- Koty
- Kohanivka
- Lelehivka
- Lypyna
- Lypovets
- lis
- Lisok
- Lisopotik
- Lozyno
- Luh
- Luzhky
- Lyubyni
- Malchytsi
- Melnyky
- Moloshkovychi
- Moriyantsi
- Muzhylovychi
- Nahachiv
- Nakonechne Druhe
- Nakonechne Pershe
- Novyy Yar
- Novyny
- Novosilky
- Ozerske
- Oselia
- Pazyniaky
- Palanky
- Peredviria
- Pidluby
- Pidryasne
- Pisotskyy
- Porichchia
- Poruby
- Porudenko
- Prylbychi
- Prynada
- Rishyn
- Rohizno
- Rokytne
- Rosnivka
- Ruda
- Ruda-Krakovetska
- Rulevo
- Riasne-Ruske
- Salashi
- Sarny
- Svydnytsia
- Semyrivka
- Seredyna
- Seredkevychi
- Serednii Horb
- Slobodiaky
- Smolyn
- Solyhy
- Soluky
- Sopit
- Stavky
- Stadnyky
- Staryi Yar
- Starychi
- Steni
- Stradch
- Ternovytsia
- Turycha
- Hlyany
- Tsetulia
- Tsipivky
- Chernyliava
- Cherchyk
- Cholhyni
- Chornokuntsi
- Shavari
- Shutova
- Scheploty
- Schyhli
- Yamelnia
- Yasnyska

- Sytykhiv
- Zavyshen

== See also ==
- List of Canadian place names of Ukrainian origin
