= Lahodiv =

Rural locality in Lviv Oblast, Ukraine

Coordinates: 50°5′24″N 25°5′24″E

- Village
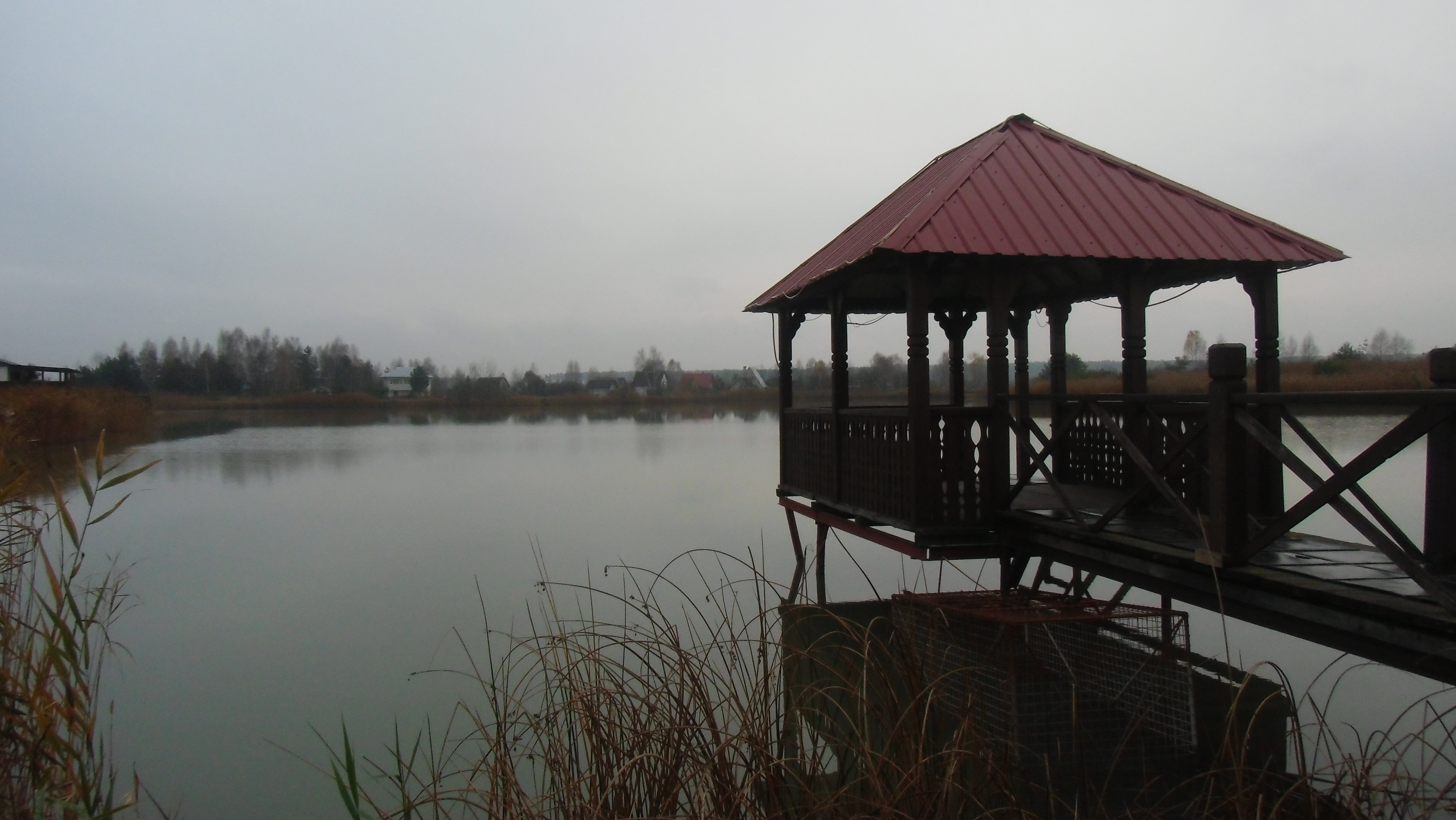
- Lahodivsky pond
- Interactive map of Lahodiv
- Country: Ukraine
- Oblast: Lviv
- Raion: Zolochiv
- Area: 5.077 km^{2} (1.960 sq mi)
- Elevation: 223 m (732 ft)
- Population: 263
  - Density: 51.8/km^{2} (134/sq mi)

Lahodiv (Ukrainian: Лагодів) is a village (selo) in Zolochiv Raion, Lviv Oblast, in western Ukraine. It belongs to Brody urban hromada, one of the hromadas of Ukraine.

== Etymology ==
The name of the village of Lahodiv is connected with the main dam of the Lahodiv pond, which was located within the village in the 16th–18th centuries (now the dam is called the road, 1.4 km long, leading from Lahodiv to the tract Hatka). The size of the dam was large and a lot of time was spent on its construction (repair, Ukrainian: лагодити, lahodyty). Apparently, when the dam was built, this place was named – "where they repair" (Ukrainian: там, де лагодять), which over time was transformed into the current name of the village – Lahodiv.

== Geography ==
Not far from the village of Lahodiv is the Lahodiv Reserve, created in 1984 to preserve the natural landscape with valuable high-yielding plantations of Scots pine.

== History ==
An ancient village with an interesting history. Within the village there was a famous Lahodivsky pond in the 16th–18th centuries. The water from the Lahodivsky pond was most likely drained when the Brody fortress was destroyed in 1812 and was no longer filled.

The owner of the village, Jozef Potocki, helped to establish a factory in the village for the production of carpets (like Persian ones), which had oriental patterns.

In the 18th century a one-storey house was built in the village, which belonged to Counts Tarnowski.

In the XIX century – a village in the Brody County of the Kingdom of Galicia and Lodomeria of Austria-Hungary.

On the eve of the Second World War, Lahodiv was part of the rural commune of Konyushki, Brody County, Tarnopol Voivodeship, Poland.

At the beginning of 1940, the village became part of the newly created Brody Raion of the Lviv region of the Ukrainian SSR. In the late 1960s, the village was subordinated to the Konyushkivska village council, the center of which was moved to Yazlivchyk until 1978.

Currently, the village has a medical and obstetric center, the People's House "Prosvita", as well as a small church of the Introduction to the Church of the Blessed Virgin of the PCU. The Brody children's health camp "Youth" has been operating in the village since 1995.

Until 18 July 2020, Lahodiv belonged to Brody Raion. The raion was abolished in July 2020 as part of the administrative reform of Ukraine, which reduced the number of raions of Lviv Oblast to seven. The area of Brody Raion was merged into Zolochiv Raion.

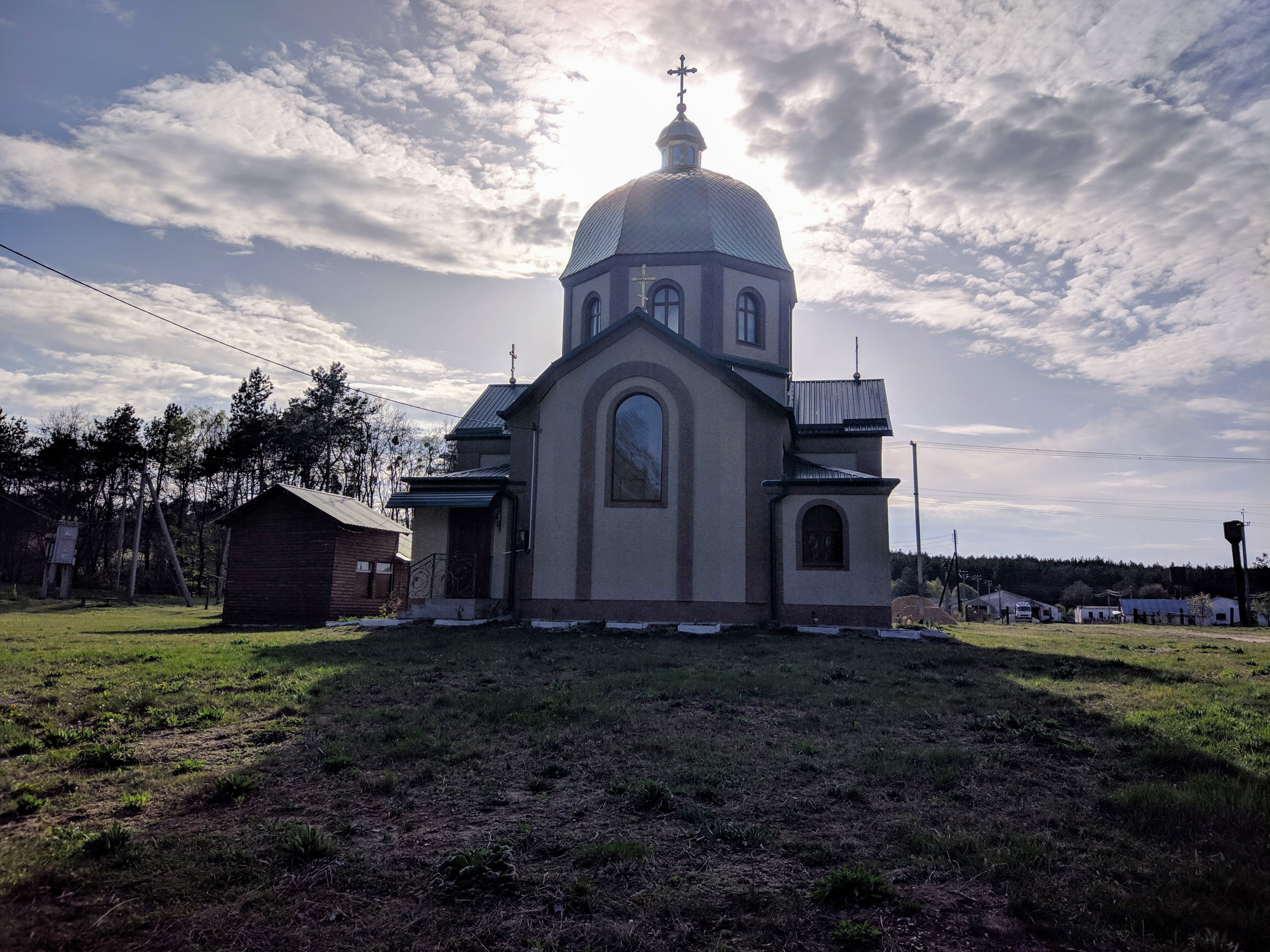
Church of the Entry into the Church of the Blessed Virgin

== Demographics ==
According to the "Dictionary of the Geographical Kingdom of Poland and Other Slavic Lands", in 1880 there were 335 people living in Lahodiv and 12 on the outskirts, 60 of them were Roman Catholics, 273 were Greek Catholics. In 1939, 580 people lived in the village, including 470 Ruthenians (Ukrainians), 20 Poles and 90 Latins.

According to the 1989 census of the USSR, 264 people lived in the village (104 men, 160 women). According to the All-Ukrainian Census of 2001, only 263 people lived in the village. Almost all called their native language – Ukrainian, and only 2 people (0.76%) – Russian.
