= Hrymalivka =

Rural locality in Lviv Oblast, Ukraine

Coordinates: 50°16′46″N 25°3′7″E

- Village
- Interactive map of Hrymalivka
- Country: Ukraine
- Oblast: Lviv
- Raion: Zolochiv Raion
- Hromada: Brody urban hromada
- Area: 712 km^{2} (275 sq mi)
- Population: 231
  - Density: 324/km^{2} (840/sq mi)

Hrymalivka (Note: Ukrainian: Грималівка, Polish: Grzymałówka) is a village in Lviv Oblast in western Ukraine. It lies on the Styr River, 26 km from the city of Brody and just south of the border with Volyn Oblast.

== History ==
The first mention of the village of Hrymalivka is found in a 1629 Polish census document, which refers to it as a newly established wola with thirteen houses. The village's owner, Mateusz Leszniowski from the nearby town of Leszniów, used the Grzymała coat of arms, from which the village's name, Grzymałówka in Polish, is believed to be derived.

In 1641, Leszniowski's descendants sold his estates to the Polish military commander Stanisław Koniecpolski. These were eventually passed down to his grandson, also named Stanisław, who had no children, so he sold the land to his relative Jan Aleksander Koniecpolski. In 1723, the village was sold to the noble Potocki family.

During the partitions of Poland, Galicia (Eastern Europe) became part of the Austrian Empire and Volhynia became part of the Russian Empire. As a result, the village of Hrymalivka found itself found itself on the border of the two empires, and a customs post was established in the village.

A school operated in the village starting in 1876. From 1876 until 1914, the following teachers taught in the school: Y. Lamboi, H. Podkiedaniets, T. Kondratovych, Y. Yavorsky, I. Kostek, P. Yakubovsky, M. Medynsky, and H. Herman.

During the First World War, fighting took place near Hrymalivka, and trenches from the war can be found in the village's forest. After the war, Hrymalivka eventually became part of the new Polish state. Under Polish rule, conflict between Ukrainian and Polish villagers was frequent. On Easter Sunday in 1935, a massive three-hour brawl took place in which several dozen people were severely beaten. During the 1930s, the Ukrainian Prosvita society, the Ukrainian patriotic sporting club Luh and the Polish education organization People's School operated in the village.

During the Second World War, the Styr River on which the village lies became a front line in March 1944. Hrymalivka's residents were evacuated to the village of Honoratka of Rivne Oblast. Numerous buildings in Hrymalivka were damaged during this time, and more than twenty residents who had been conscripted into the Red Army were killed in action.

Also during the war, a prominent cell of the Ukrainian Insurgent Army of the Organization of Ukrainian Nationalists operated in Hrymalivka, under the command of Leshniv resident Stepan Myhal. Over thirty residents of Hrymalivka were killed in action while fighting in the ranks of the Ukrainian Insurgent Army.

On 26 February 1945, Ukrainian Insurgent Army units conducted an assault on a Soviet military headquarters in Leshniv. The insurgents then withdrew back to their camp in the forests just north of Hrymalivka, which was raided by the NKVD the next day. According to Ukrainian Insurgent Army sources, the battle involved just seventeen insurgents against 300 NKVD men. Four Ukrainian rebels and over twenty Soviet troops were reportedly killed in action. In 1995 and 2012, local authorities commemorated the battle by erecting monuments.

The village was collectivized in February 1950. In the 1960s, Soviet authorities closed the village church, which became used for the storage of grain from the collective farm. Church services resumed in November 1989.

== Administration ==
From 1918 to 1939, under the rule of Poland, the village belonged to the powiat of Brody, in the Tarnopol Voivodeship.

Under the Ukrainian SSR, and after Ukrainian independence, Hrymalivka belonged to the Brody Raion and the rural council of Leshniv.

On 18 July 2020, as part of an administrative reform in Ukraine, Brody Raion was abolished and merged into Zolochiv Raion. On the hromada level, Hrymalivka belongs to the Brody urban hromada.

== Demographics ==
The 1880 Austro-Hungarian census found that of the village's 609 residents, 148 were Roman Catholics, 438 were Greek Catholics, and 23 were Jewish.

At the end of the 19th century, the village had 668 residents. 234 were Roman Catholics, 420 were Greek Catholics, and 14 were Jews.

As of 1932, there were 648 people and 130 houses in Hrymalivka.

According to a 1939 census, 840 people lived in the village. 530 were Ukrainians, 155 were Latynnyky (culturally Ukrainian Roman Catholics), 150 were Poles, and 5 were Jews. In the year 1940, nineteen children, 9 boys and 10 girls, were born in the village: 13 to Ukrainian families, two to Polish families, and four to mixed Polish-Ukrainian families.

The 1989 Soviet census found that the village had 245 residents, of which 106 were men and 139 were women.

At the time of the 2001 Ukrainian census, 231 people lived in the village, all of whom named Ukrainian as their native language.
