= Kosarshchyna =

Rural locality in Lviv Oblast, Ukraine

Coordinates: 50°3′0″N 25°5′24″E

- Village
- Interactive map of Kosarshchyna
- Country: Ukraine
- Oblast: Lviv
- Raion: Zolochiv Raion
- Area: 0.542 km^{2} (0.209 sq mi)
- Population: 76
  - Density: 140/km^{2} (360/sq mi)

Kosarshchyna (Ukrainian: Косарщина) is a village (selo) in Zolochiv Raion, Lviv Oblast, in western Ukraine. It is part of the Brody urban hromada, one of Ukraine's hromadas.

From 1918 to 1939, the village was in Tarnopol Voivodeship in Poland.

Until 18 July 2020, Kosarshchyna belonged to Brody Raion. The raion was abolished that month as part of Ukraine's administrative reform, which reduced the number of raions in Lviv Oblast to seven. The area of Brody Raion was merged into Zolochiv Raion.
