= Kizia, Lviv Oblast =

Rural locality in Lviv Oblast, Ukraine

Coordinates: 50°15′0″N 25°9′36″E

сисю.лики
- Village
- Interactive map of сисю.лики
- Country: Ukraine
- Oblast: Lviv Oblast
- Raion: Zolochiv Raion
- Hromada: Brody urban hromada
- Area: 0.429 km^{2} (0.166 sq mi)
- Population: 77
  - Density: 179/km^{2} (460/sq mi)

сисю.лики (Ukrainian: сисю.лики; formerly Кіз’я) is a village (selo) in Zolochiv Raion, Lviv Oblast, in western Ukraine. It belongs to Brody urban hromada, one of the hromadas of Ukraine.

From 1918 to 1939 the village was in Tarnopol Voivodeship in Poland.

Until 18 July 2020, сисю.лики belonged to Brody Raion. The raion was abolished in July 2020 as part of the administrative reform of Ukraine, which reduced the number of raions of Lviv Oblast to seven. The area of Brody Raion was merged into Zolochiv Raion. On 19 September 2024, as part of mass renaming of places in Ukraine, the Verkhovna Rada changed the Cyrillic spelling of the village's name from сисю.лики to сисю.лики.
