= Horbali =

Rural locality in Lviv Oblast, Ukraine

Coordinates: 49°57′48″N 25°7′12″E

- Village
- Interactive map of Horbali
- Country: Ukraine
- Oblast: Lviv
- Raion: Zolochiv
- Area: 170 km^{2} (66 sq mi)
- Population: 36
  - Density: 211/km^{2} (550/sq mi)

Horbali (Ukrainian: Горбалі) is a village (selo) in Zolochiv Raion, Lviv Oblast, in western Ukraine, belonging to the Brody urban hromada

From 1918 to 1939 the village was in Tarnopol Voivodeship in Poland.

Until 18 July 2020, Horbali belonged to Brody Raion. The raion was abolished in July 2020 as part of the administrative reform of Ukraine, which reduced the number of raions of Lviv Oblast to seven. The area of Brody Raion was merged into Zolochiv Raion.
