= Stanislavchyk =

Rural locality in Lviv Oblast, Ukraine

- Village
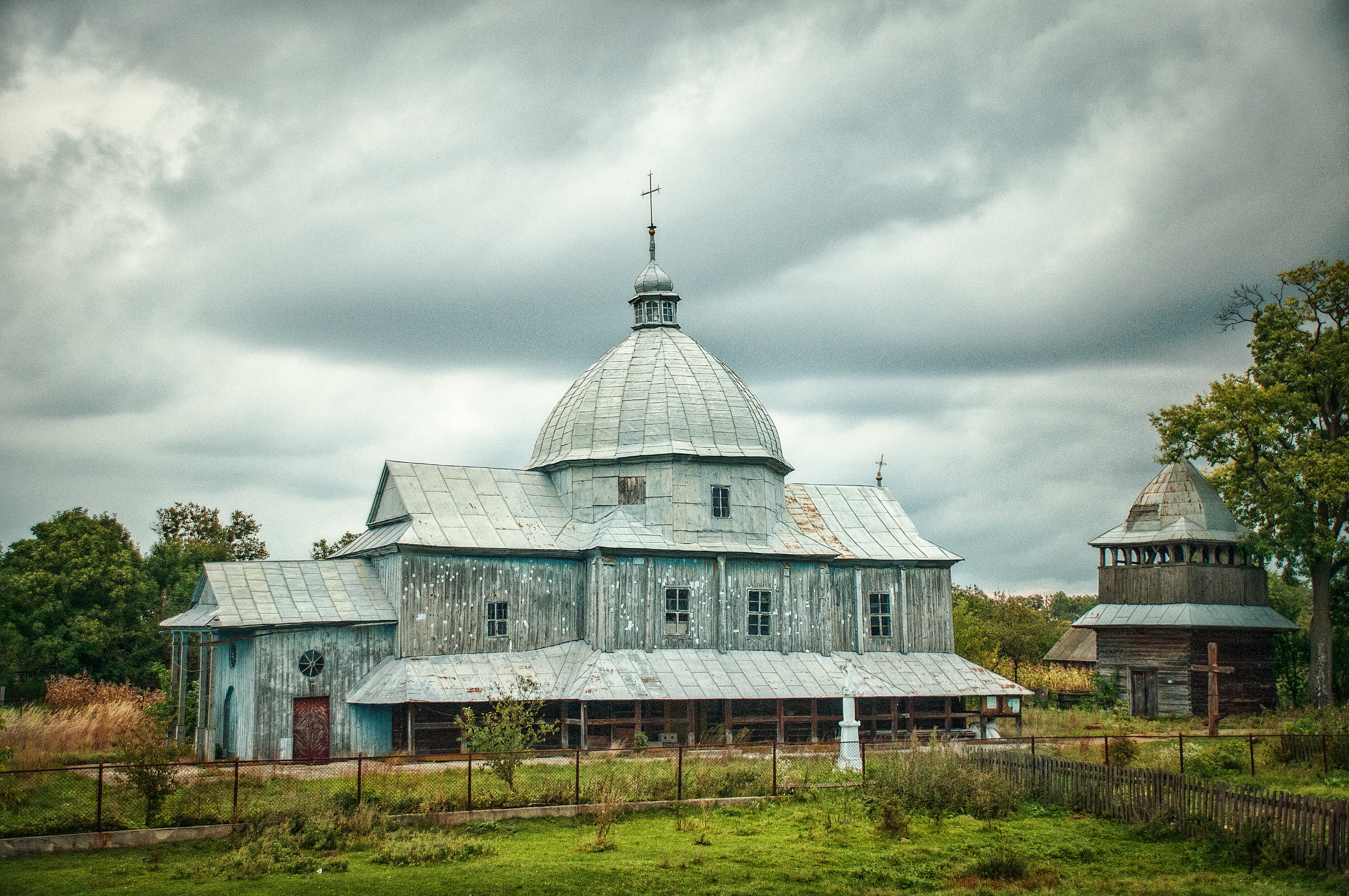
- Saint Michael's Church

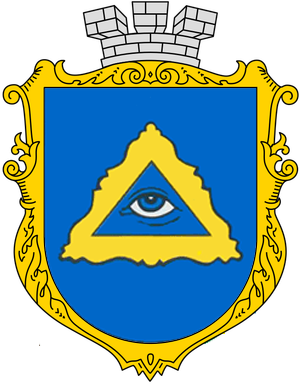
- Coat of arms

- Location within Lviv Oblast Location within Ukraine
- Country: Ukraine
- Oblast: Lviv
- Raion: Zolochiv Raion
- Area: 1.672 km^{2} (0.646 sq mi)
- Population: 460
  - Density: 275/km^{2} (710/sq mi)

Stanislavchyk (Ukrainian: Станіславчик) is a village (selo) in Zolochiv, Lviv Oblast, in western Ukraine. It belongs to Brody urban hromada, one of the hromadas of Ukraine.

From 1918 to 1939 the village was in Tarnopol Voivodeship in Poland. In 1921 the village had 1153 inhabitants.

Until 18 July 2020, Stanislavchyk belonged to Brody Raion. The raion was abolished in July 2020 as part of the administrative reform of Ukraine, which reduced the number of raions of Lviv Oblast to seven. The area of Brody Raion was merged into Zolochiv Raion.
