= Zbrui =

Rural locality in Lviv Oblast, Ukraine

- Village
- Location within Lviv Oblast Location within Ukraine
- Coordinates: 50.1514°N 24.935°E
- Country: Ukraine
- Oblast: Lviv
- Raion: Zolochiv
- Area: 0.574 km^{2} (0.222 sq mi)
- Population: 154
  - Density: 268/km^{2} (690/sq mi)

Zbrui (Ukrainian: Збруї) is a village (selo) in Zolochiv Raion, Lviv Oblast, in western Ukraine. It belongs to Brody urban hromada, one of the hromadas of Ukraine.

From 1918 to 1939 the village was in Tarnopol Voivodeship in Poland.

Until 18 July 2020, Zbrui belonged to Brody Raion. The raion was abolished in July 2020 as part of the administrative reform of Ukraine, which reduced the number of raions of Lviv Oblast to seven. The area of Brody Raion was merged into Zolochiv Raion.
