= Hai, Lviv Oblast =

Rural locality in Lviv Oblast, Ukraine

Coordinates: 50°2′59″N 25°11′35″E

Hai Гаї
- Village
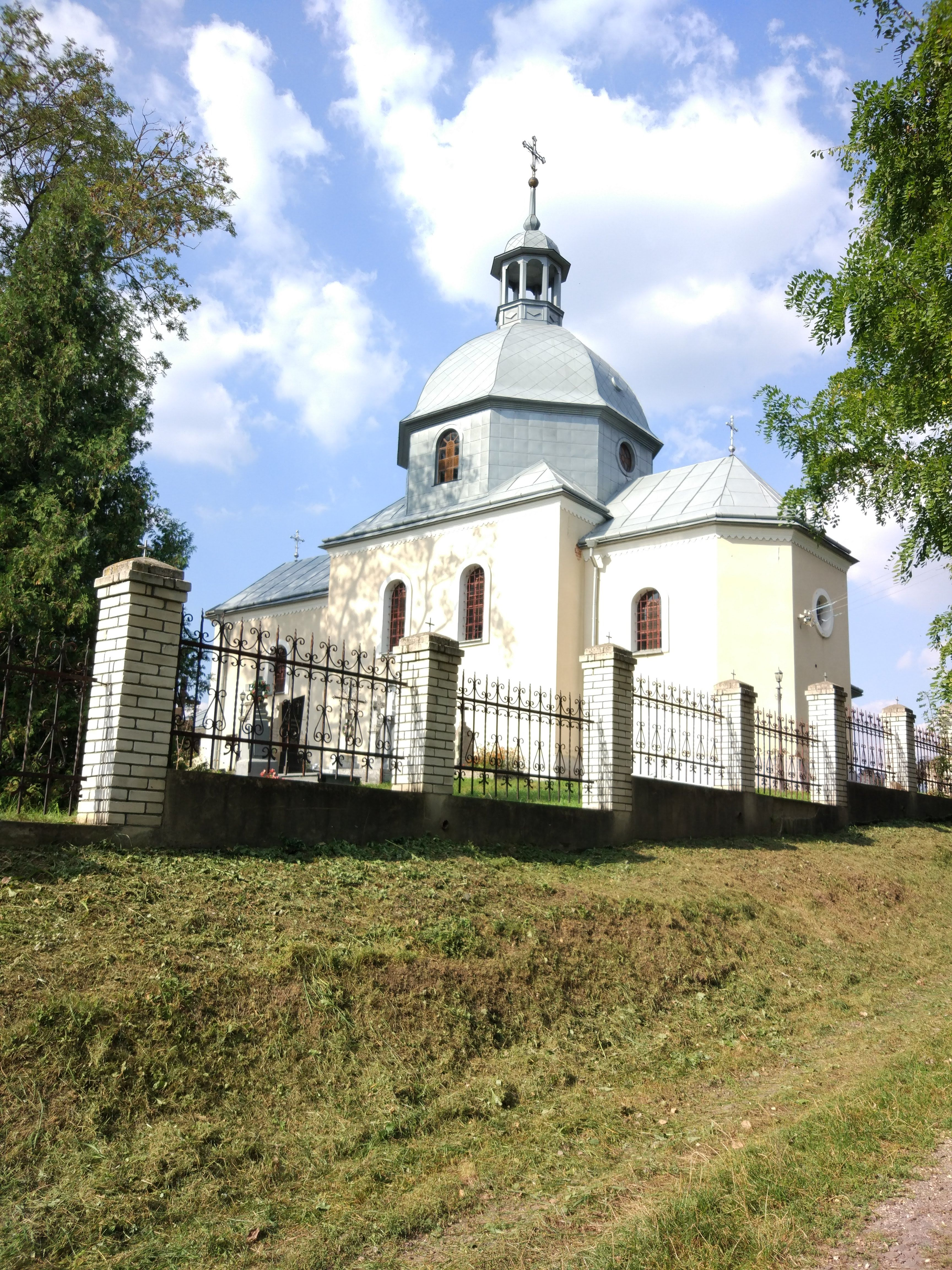
- Church of the Intercession of the Blessed Virgin Mary
- Interactive map of Hai
- Country: Ukraine
- Oblast: Lviv Oblast
- Raion: Zolochiv Raion
- Hromada: Brody urban hromada

Area
  - Total: 3,250 km^{2} (1,250 sq mi)

Population
  - Total: 655

Hai (Ukrainian: Гаї) is a village in Zolochiv Raion of Lviv Oblast, Ukraine. It belongs to Brody urban hromada, one of the hromadas of Ukraine. Population is 655. Postal code is 80650.

== History ==
Until 18 July 2020, Hai belonged to Brody Raion. The raion was abolished in July 2020 as part of the administrative reform of Ukraine, which reduced the number of raions of Lviv Oblast to seven. The area of Brody Raion was merged into Zolochiv Raion.
