= Pidhiria, Brody urban hromada, Zolochiv Raion, Lviv Oblast =

Rural locality in Lviv Oblast, Ukraine

Pidhiria
- Village
- Interactive map of Pidhiria
- Coordinates: 49°58′23″N 25°08′02″E
- Country: Ukraine
- Oblast: Lviv
- Raion: Zolochiv
- Area: 0.885 km^{2} (0.342 sq mi)
- Population: 444
  - Density: 501/km^{2} (1,300/sq mi)

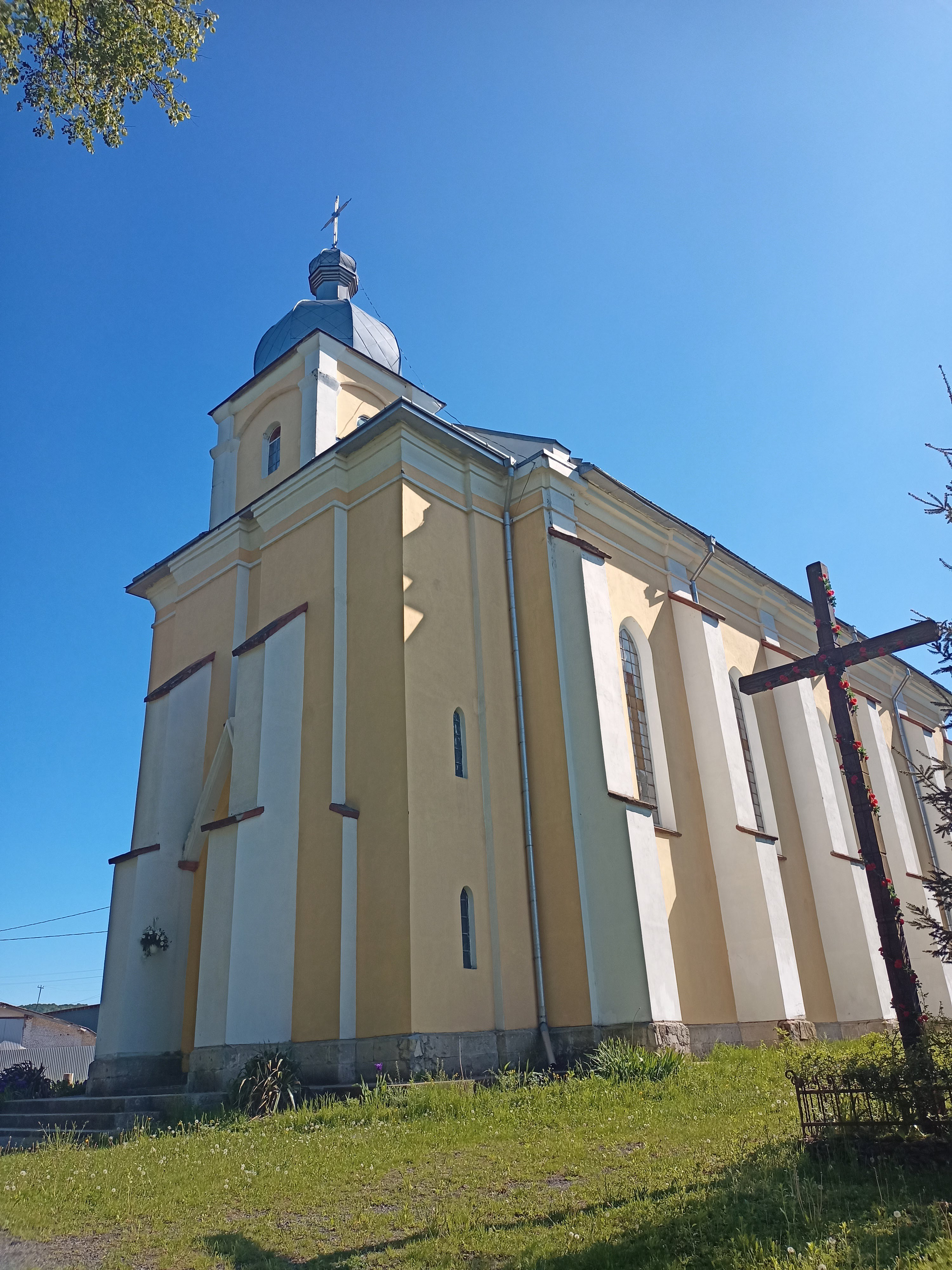
Pidhiria. Church of St. Joseph, the Spouse of the Blessed Virgin Mary

Pidhiria (Ukrainian: Підгір'я, Polish: Wołochy) is a village (selo) in Zolochiv Raion, Lviv Oblast, in western Ukraine. It belongs to Brody urban hromada, one of the hromadas of Ukraine.

From 1918 to 1939 the village was in Tarnopol Voivodeship in Poland.

Until 18 July 2020, Pidhiria belonged to Brody Raion. The raion was abolished in July 2020 as part of the administrative reform of Ukraine, which reduced the number of raions in Lviv Oblast to seven. The area of Brody Raion was merged into Zolochiv Raion.
