= Lisove =

Lisove (Ukrainian: Лісове) may refer to the following localities in Ukraine,

- Lisove, Kirovohrad Oblast, an urban-type settlement in Kirovohrad Oblast
- Lisove, Brody Raion, a village in Lviv Oblast
