= Mytnytsia =

Village in Lviv Oblast, Ukraine

- Village
- Location within Ukraine
- Coordinates: 50°16′49″N 25°7′46″E
- Country: Ukraine
- Oblast: Lviv
- Raion: Zolochiv

Area
  - Total: 0.272 km^{2} (0.105 sq mi)

Population
  - Total: 77
  - Density: 283/km^{2} (730/sq mi)

Mytnytsia (Ukrainian: Митниця) is a village (selo) in Zolochiv Raion, Lviv Oblast, in western Ukraine. It belongs to Brody urban hromada, one of the hromadas of Ukraine. (Note: "Brodivsʹka misʹka hromada" Бродівська міська громада [Brody city community]. Gromada.info (in Ukrainian). Archived from the original on 2022-06-01.)

From 1918 to 1939, the village was in Tarnopol Voivodeship in Poland.

Until 18 July 2020, Mytnytsia belonged to Brody Raion. The raion was abolished in July 2020 as part of the administrative reform of Ukraine, which reduced the number of raions of Lviv Oblast to seven. The area of Brody Raion was merged into Zolochiv Raion. (Note: "Pro utvorennya ta likvidatsiyu rayoniv" Про утворення та ліквідацію районів [About formation and liquidation of areas]. Voice of Ukraine (in Ukrainian). 2020-07-18. Archived from the original on 2022-05-30.)
