= Pidhiria =

Pidhiria is a name of several populated places in Ukraine:

- Pidhiria, Brody Raion, a village in Lviv Oblast
- Pidhiria, Bohorodchany Raion, a village in Ivano-Frankivsk Oblast
