= Pankova =

Pankova may refer to:

- Pankova, Ukraine, a village in Ukraine
- Pankow (surname)
