= Brody urban hromada =

Hromada in Lviv Oblast, Ukraine

Brody urban hromada Бродівська міська громада
- Hromada
- Seal
- Interactive map of Brody urban hromada
- Country: Ukraine
- Oblast: Lviv Oblast
- Raion: Zolochiv Raion
- Administrative center: Brody

Area
  - Total: 6,096 km^{2} (2,354 sq mi)

Population (2020)
  - Total: 39,471
  - Density: 6.475/km^{2} (16.77/sq mi)
- Settlements: 51
- Cities: 1
- Villages: 50

Brody urban hromada (Ukrainian: Бродівська міська громада) is a hromada in Ukraine, in Zolochiv Raion of Lviv Oblast. The administrative center is the city of Brody.

== Settlements ==
The hromada consists of 1 city (Brody) and 50 villages:

- Antosia
- Berlyn
- Biliavtsi
- Bovdury
- Boratyn
- Borduliaky
- Buchyna
- Vydra
- Hai
- Hai-Ditkovetski
- Hai-Smolenski
- Hai-Sukhodilski
- Hlushyn
- Holoskovychi
- Horbali
- Hrymalivka
- Ditkivtsi
- Zbrui
- Kizia
- Klekotiv
- Kovpyn Stavok
- Komarivka
- Koniushkiv
- Korolivka
- Korsiv
- Kosarshchyna
- Kuty
- Lahodiv
- Leshniv
- Lypyna
- Lisove
- Mytnytsia
- Midne
- Monastyrok
- Orany
- Pankova
- Perelisky
- Pidhiria
- Pisky
- Ponykva
- Ponykovytsia
- Salashka
- Sydynivka
- Smilne
- Stanislavchyk
- Sukhovolia
- Sukhodoly
- Sukhota
- Shnyriv
- Yazlivchyk
