= Brody Raion =

Former subdivision of Lviv Oblast, Ukraine

Brody Raion Бродівський район
- Raion
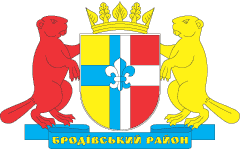
- Flag Coat of arms

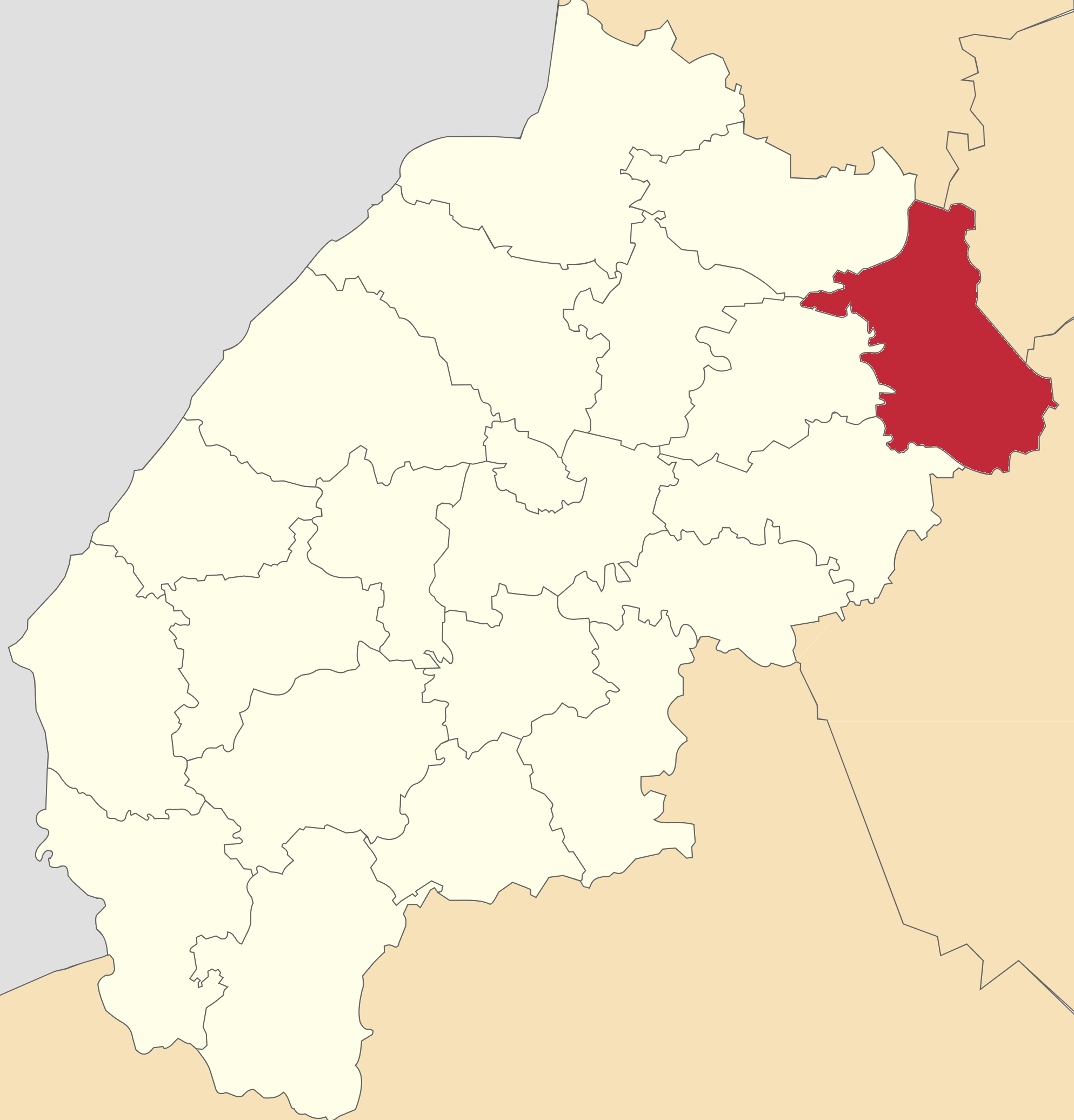
- Coordinates: 50°2′30″N 25°6′47″E
- Country: Ukraine
- Region: Lviv Oblast
- Disestablished: 18 July 2020
- Admin. center: Brody
- Subdivisions: List: — city councils; — settlement councils; — rural councils; Number of localities: — cities; — urban-type settlements; 76 — villages; — rural settlements

Population (2020)
  - Total: 57,457
- Time zone: UTC+02:00 (EET)
  - Summer (DST): UTC+03:00 (EEST)
- Area code: 380-3266
- Website: http://www.brody.lviv.ua Brody

Brody Raion (Ukrainian: Бродівський район, romanized: Brodivs'kyi raion) was a raion (district) of Lviv Oblast in western Ukraine. Its administrative center was Brody. The raion was abolished on 18 July 2020 as part of an administrative reform in Ukraine, which reduced the number of raions of Lviv Oblast to seven. The area of Brody Raion was merged into Zolochiv Raion. The last estimate of the population of the raion was 57,457 (2020 est.).

The raion was located at the easternmost portion of Lviv Oblast, bordering Rivne and Ternopil Oblasts to its east, Volyn Oblast to the north, Radekhiv Raion to the northwest, Busk Raion to the west, and Zolochiv Raion to the southwest.

Historically, the district (county) had been known as a border checkpoint between the Austria-Hungary Empire and the Russian Empire. As a county (powiat), it was established in 1866 as part of the Kingdom of Galicia and Lodomeria. After World War I, the area became part of the Second Polish Republic's Tarnopol Voivodeship. During the invasion of Soviet forces at the beginning of World War II, the district was established by the Soviet administration.

The raion had a city administrative area, a "town with three other villages" administrative area and 23 rural councils which were formed out of the rest of the 73 villages. Some councils included up to 10 villages (Ponykva), while some consisted only of a pair of villages.

== Subdivisions ==
At the time of its disestablishment, the raion consisted of three hromadas:

- Brody urban hromada with the administration in Brody;
- Pidkamin settlement hromada with the administration in the urban-type settlement of Pidkamin;
- Zabolottsi rural hromada with the administration in the selo of Zabolottsi.

== Landmarks of architecture ==
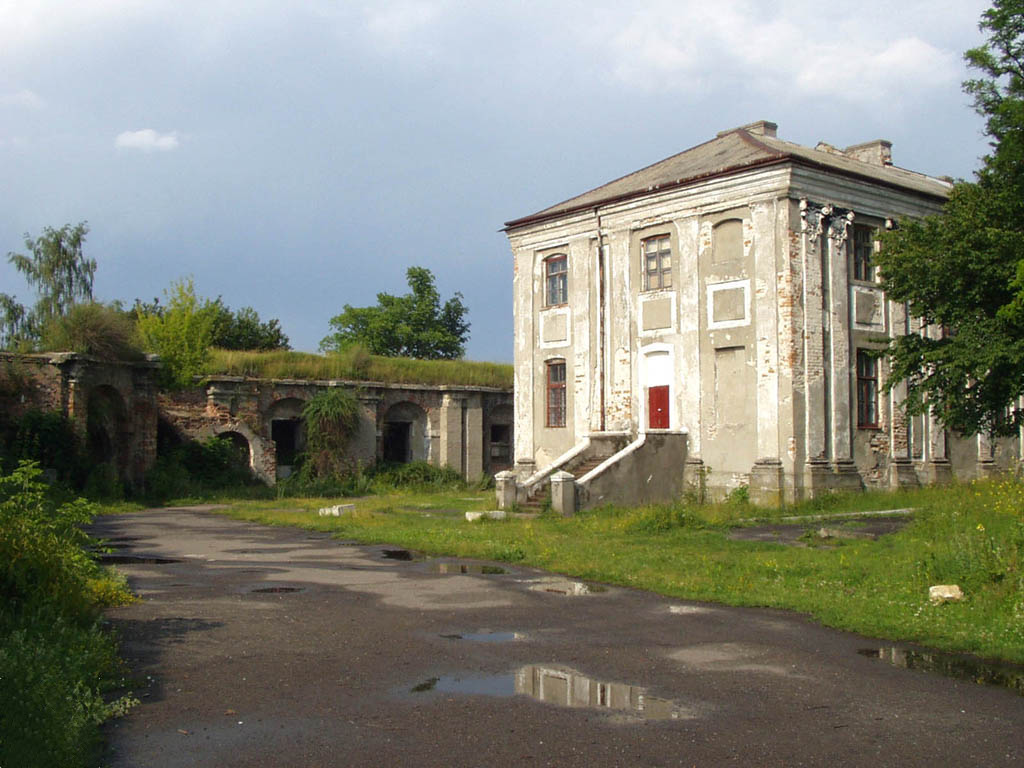
Ruins of Brody Castle with Potocki Palace

- Ruins of the Brody Castle, built by Guillaume Le Vasseur de Beauplan (1630–1635)
- Church of Vozdvyzhenia Chesnoho Khresta (former kosciol, 1660)
- Church of the Nativity of the Virgin Mary (18th century)
- Church of Saint George (18th century)
- Church of Holy Trinity (1750s)
- Ruins of Brody Synagogue (1750s)
- Jewish Cemetery in Brody

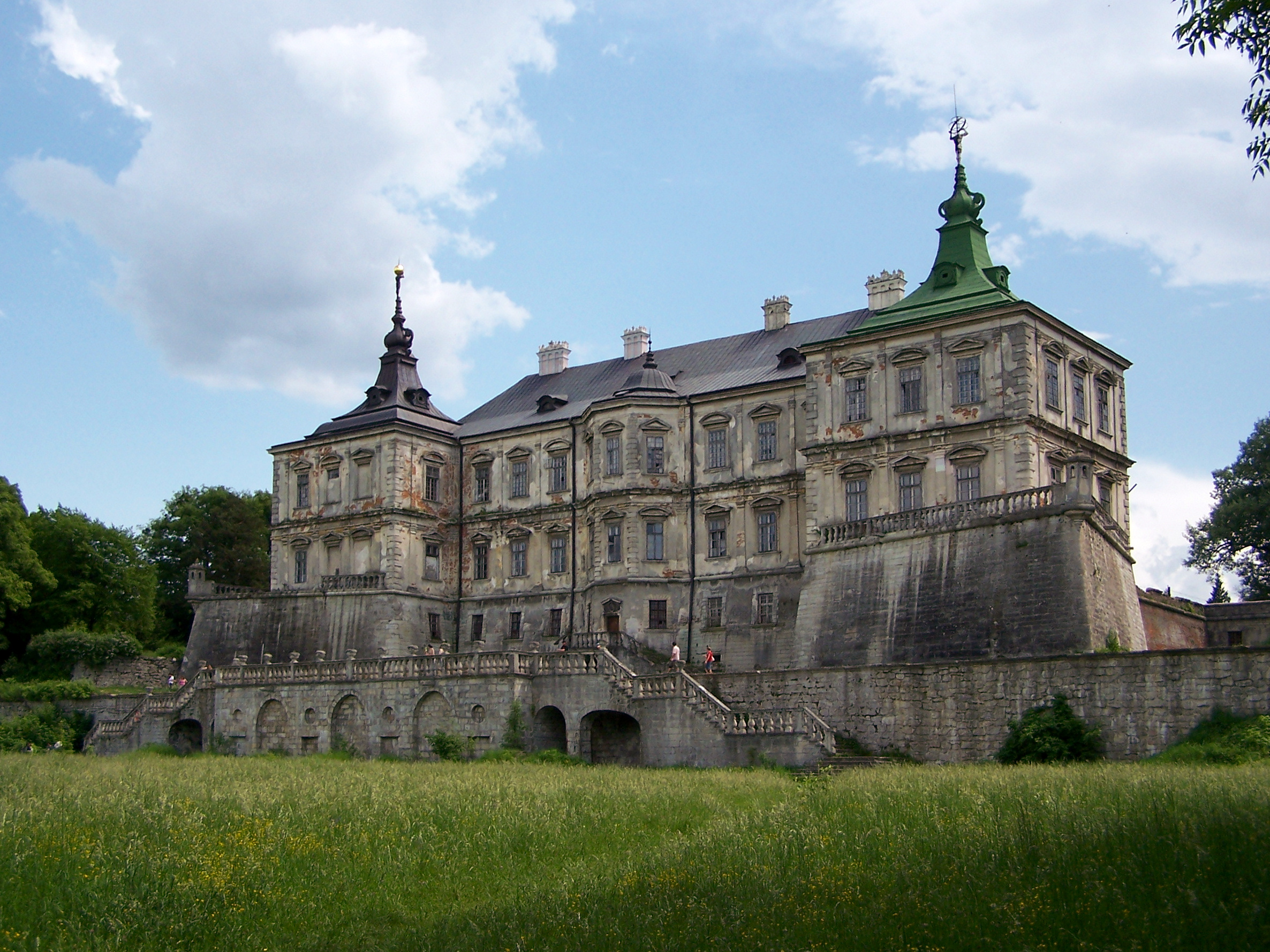
Pidhirtsi Castle

- Pidhirtsi Castle, built by Beauplan
  - Castle's kosciol
  - Inner court with a solar clock
  - Castle's garden
- Church of Saint Michael (18th century)
- 400-year-old linden tree
- Plisnysko Gord
- Order of Saint Basil Monastery (18th century)

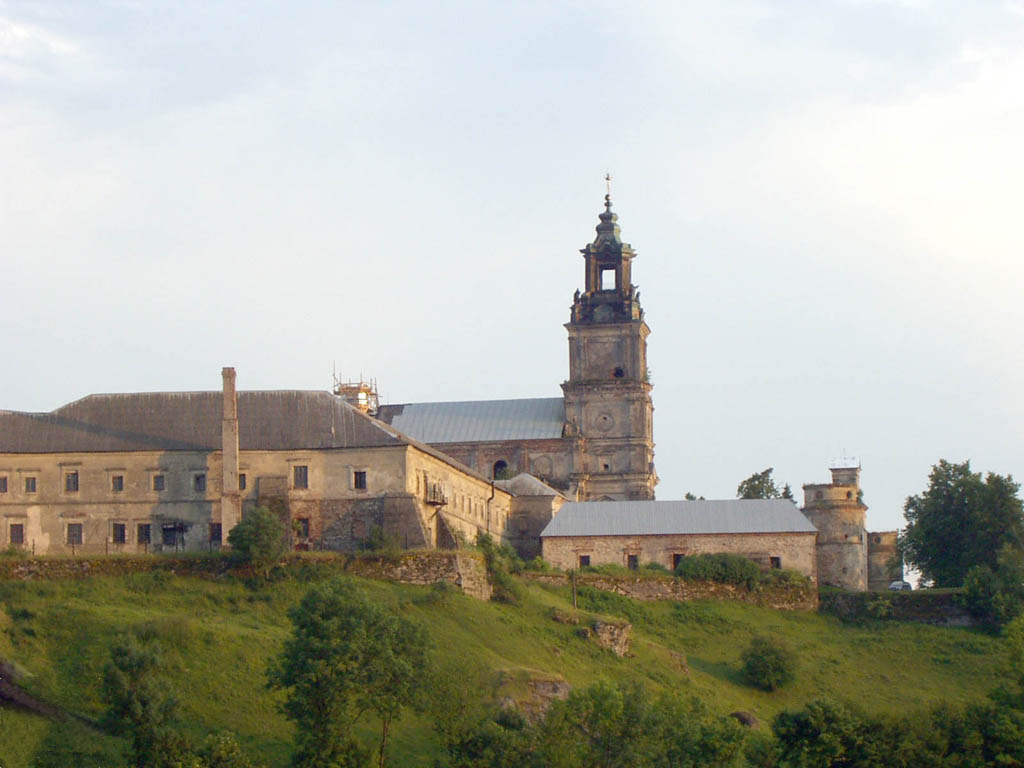
Monastery in Pidkamin

- Monastery UGCC (earlier Dominican Order) (Pidkamin)
  - Building of kosciol
  - Monastery cells
  - Defensive walls and bastions
  - Corinth column with a statue of the Virgin Mary
- Several towns chapels
- Dominican cemetery
- 17-meter tall rock, leftover of a sea reef
- Wooden kosciol of Yazlivchyk (1930s)
- Potocki Palace in Konyushkiv (18th century)
- Cossack cemetery near Shnyriv (1651)
- Kosciol ruins of the former Order of Saint Bernardine Monastery

== Education ==
- Markian Shashkevych Brody Pedagogical College

== Health care ==
- Brody Central District Hospital
- Pidkamin City Hospital
- Zabolotsi District Hospital
- Dental Clinic

== See also ==
- Administrative divisions of Lviv Oblast
