= Tarnopol Voivodeship =

Former voivodeship of Poland

Coordinates: 49°33′01″N 25°35′55″E

Tarnopol Voivodeship Województwo tarnopolskie
- Voivodeship of Poland
- 1920–1939
- Coat of arms

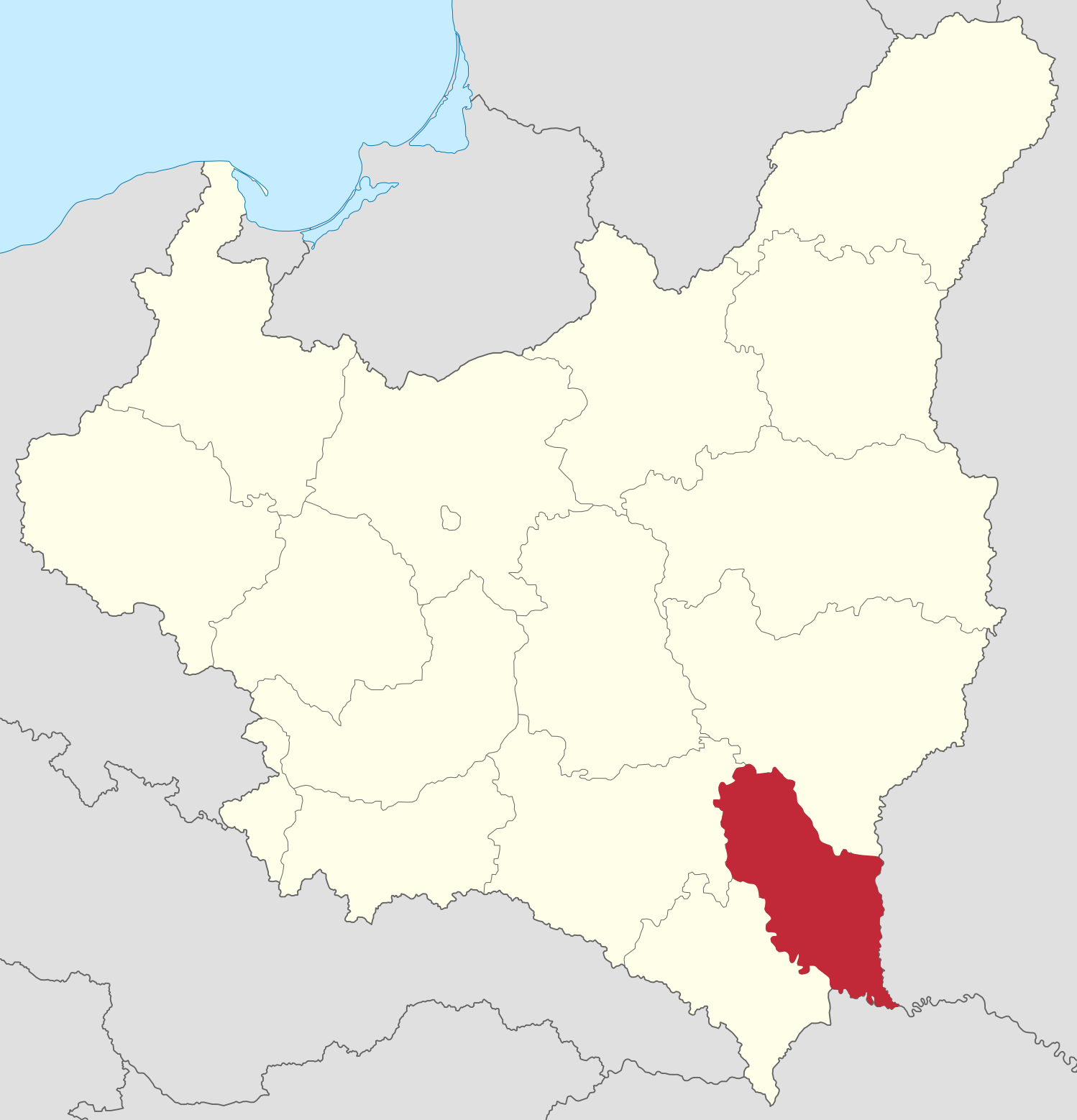
- Tarnopol Voivodeship (red) on the map of Second Polish Republic
- Capital: Tarnopol
- Area
  - 1921: 16,533 km^{2} (6,383 sq mi)
- Population
  - 1921: 1,428,520
  - 1931: 1,600,406
- Government
  - Type: Voivodeship
- Voivodes
  - 1921–1923: Karol Olpiński
  - 1937–1939: Tomasz Malicki
- Historical era: Interwar period
  - Established: 23 December 1920
  - Soviet invasion: 17 September 1939
- Political subdivisions: 17 powiats, 35 towns
Preceded by	Succeeded by
Ukrainian People's Republic	Ukraine SSR
- Today part of: Ukraine

Tarnopol Voivodeship (Polish: Województwo tarnopolskie; Ukrainian: Тернопільське воєводство, romanized: Ternopilske voievodstvo) was an administrative region of interwar Poland (1918–1939), created on 23 December 1920, with an area of 16,500 km^{2} and provincial capital in Tarnopol (now Ternopil, Ukraine). The voivodeship was divided into 17 districts (powiaty). At the end of World War II, at the insistence of Joseph Stalin during the Tehran Conference of 1943 without official Polish representation whatsoever, the borders of Poland were redrawn by the Allies. The Polish population was forcibly resettled after the defeat of Nazi Germany and the Tarnopol Voivodeship was incorporated into the Ukrainian SSR of the Soviet Union. Since 1991, the territory of the voivodeship has been split between the eastern part of the Lviv region and the central and southern parts of the Ternopil region in sovereign Ukraine.

== September 1939 and its aftermath ==
During the Nazi invasion of Poland in accordance with the secret protocol of the Molotov–Ribbentrop Pact, Soviet forces invaded eastern Poland on 17 September 1939. As the bulk of the Polish Army was concentrated in the west fighting the Nazi Germans (see: Polish September campaign), the Red Army met with limited resistance from Polish citizens and their troops quickly moved westward. Tarnopol was occupied as early as 18 September 1939 without substantial opposition from the Poles, and remained in Soviet hands until Operation Barbarossa. Monuments were destroyed, street names changed, bookshops closed, library collections stolen and transported in lorries to the Russian archives. The province was Sovietized in the atmosphere of terror. Families were deported to Siberia in cattle trains, mainly Polish Christians.

During the German invasion of the Soviet Union in 1941, Tarnopol was overrun by the Wehrmacht on 2 July 1941. A Jewish pogrom lasted from 4 to 11 July 1941, with homes destroyed, synagogues burned and Jews killed indiscriminately at various locations, estimated between 1,600 (Yad Vashem) and 2,000 (Virtual Shtetl). The killings were perpetrated by the SS-Sonderkommando 4b attached to Einsatzgruppe C, and by the Ukrainian People's Militia, formed by the Organization of Ukrainian Nationalists – renamed the following month to the Ukrainian Auxiliary Police.

In September 1941, the German occupation authorities established Jewish ghettos in a number of towns including the Tarnopol Ghetto with 12,000–13,000 prisoners. Death penalty was introduced, and food severely rationed. Forced labour camps for Jewish slave workers were established by the Germans in the settlements of Kamionki, Hłuboczek Wielki, Zagrobela, and in Podwołoczyska. The Tarnopol ghetto was liquidated between August 1942 and June 1943. The victims were deported to Belzec extermination camp. Many Jews were denounced by Ukrainian nationalists including shortly before the Soviets took over the area in 1944. A number survived by hiding with the Poles.

== Demographics ==
The capital of Tarnopol Voivodeship was Tarnopol. After the rebirth of Poland, according to Polish census of 1921, the province was inhabited by 1,428,520 people with population density at 88 persons per km^{2}. The national census revealed that a staggering number of people could not read or write due to repressive policies of the partitioning powers; amounting to over half of the regional population of the Republic. Within the total number of inhabitants there were 447,810 Roman Catholics, and 847,907 Greek Catholics, as well as 128,967 Orthodox Christians. Ten years later, the next national census of September 1931 was conducted using different criteria. The respondents were asked about their mother tongue and religion. The population density grew to 97 persons per km^{2}.

The overall number of inhabitants in the province amounted to 1,600,406 people in 1931 of whom 789,114 spoke Polish, 401,963 spoke Ukrainian as their first language, 326,172 spoke Ruthenian (Ukrainian), 71,890 spoke Yiddish, 7,042 spoke Hebrew, 2675 spoke German, and 287 spoke Belarusian, Czech and Lithuanian. Among the Poland's Ukrainian speakers, 397,248 belonged to Greek Catholic Church, and 3,767 were Roman Catholics similar to the majority of Polish language speakers at home; nevertheless, among the Polish language speakers 157,219 belonged to Greek Catholic Church also, like the majority of those who spoke Ukrainian as their mother tongue. The overlapping of religious denominations presented the community as integrated to a considerable degree. Meanwhile, the overwhelming majority of Ruthenian (Ukrainian) speakers were Greco Catholics, like Ukrainians, and only 7,625 of them were Roman Catholics. Jews constituted 44% of the diverse multicultural makeup of Tarnopol, speaking both, Yiddish and Hebrew.

Religion was 50% Greek Catholic, 41% Roman Catholic, 9% Jewish. Ethnic Ukrainian Greek Catholics and Polish-speaking secular Jews were in some cases classified as gentile Poles in the ethnic census, and not as Ukrainians or Jews; this explains the difference between the religious and ethnic census numbers.

The results of the 1931 census (questions about mother tongue and about religion) are presented in the table below:

Ukrainian/Ruthenian and Greek Catholic/Orthodox majority minority counties are highlighted with yellow.

Comparison of Polish and Ukrainian population of Tarnopol Voivodeship according to the 1931 census
County Polish name	County	Pop.	Polish	%	Ukrainian & Ruthenian	%	Roman Catholic	%	Uniate & Orthodox	%
Borszczów	Borshchiv	103277	46153	44.7%	52612	50.9%	28432	27.5%	65344	63.3%
Brody	Brody	91248	32843	36.0%	50490	55.3%	22521	24.7%	58009	63.6%
Brzeżany	Berezhany	103824	48168	46.4%	51757	49.9%	41962	40.4%	54611	52.6%
Buczacz	Buchach	139062	60523	43.5%	70336	50.6%	51311	36.9%	77023	55.4%
Czortków	Chortkiv	84008	36486	43.4%	40866	48.6%	33080	39.4%	42828	51.0%
Kamionka Strumiłowa	Kamianka-Buzka	82111	41693	50.8%	35178	42.8%	29828	36.3%	45113	54.9%
Kopyczyńce	Kopychyntsi	88614	38158	43.1%	45196	51.0%	31202	35.2%	50007	56.4%
Podhajce	Pidhaitsi	95663	46710	48.8%	45031	47.1%	38003	39.7%	52634	55.0%
Przemyślany	Peremyshliany	89908	52269	58.1%	32777	36.5%	38475	42.8%	44002	48.9%
Radziechów	Radekhiv	69313	25427	36.7%	39970	57.7%	17945	25.9%	42928	61.9%
Skałat	Skalat	89215	60091	67.4%	25369	28.4%	45631	51.1%	34798	39.0%
Tarnopol	Ternopil	142220	93874	66.0%	42374	29.8%	63286	44.5%	60979	42.9%
Trembowla	Terebovlia	84321	50178	59.5%	30868	36.6%	38979	46.2%	40452	48.0%
Zaleszczyki	Zalishchyky	72021	27549	38.3%	41147	57.1%	17917	24.9%	48069	66.7%
Zbaraż	Zbarazh	65579	32740	49.9%	29609	45.2%	24855	37.9%	36468	55.6%
Zborów	Zboriv	81413	39624	48.7%	39174	48.1%	26239	32.2%	49925	61.3%
Złoczów	Zolochiv	118609	56628	47.7%	55381	46.7%	36937	31.1%	70663	59.6%
Województwo Tarnopolskie	Tarnopol Voivodeship	1600406	789114	49.3%	728135	45.5%	586603	36.7%	873853	54.6%

== Geography ==
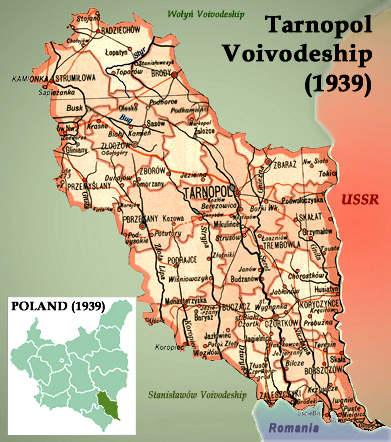
Tarnopol Voivodeship until 17 September 1939

The voivodeship's area was 16,533 square kilometers. It was located in the southeastern corner of Poland, bordering the Soviet Union to the east, Lwów Voivodeship and Stanisławów Voivodeship to the west, Romania to the south and Volhynian Voivodeship to the north. The landscape was hilly, with the Podole upland covering large part of the Voivodeship. The northwestern part of the voivovodeship was the location of the Holohory mountain range, whose highest peak is that of the Kamula mountain, 473 metres (1,552 ft) above sea level, though the peak itself was located 5 kilometres (3.1 mi) beyond Tarnopol Voivodeship's border, in the Lwów Voivodeship. The southern part of the Tarnopol Voivodeship was known for its wineries and peach orchards.

The Dniester and the Seret were the main rivers. The Zbruch River formed the border with the Soviet Union along its entire course, and the border with Romania was formed by the Dniester. The southeasternmost location in the voivodeship was the famous Polish stronghold Okopy Swietej Trojcy (Ramparts of the Holy Trinity), which for some time defended Poland against Turkish and Tatar invasions.

== Administrative subdivisions ==
The Tarnopol Voivodeship was created formally on 23 December 1920. It consisted of 17 powiats (counties), 35 towns, and 1087 villages. Its capital was also its largest city, with population of some 34,000 (as for 1931). Other important municipal centers of the voivodeship were: Czortków (pop. 19,000), Brody (pop. 16,400), Złoczów (pop. 13,000), Brzeżany (pop. 12,000) and Buczacz (pop. 11,000).

The Tarnopol Voivodeship consisted of 17 powiats (counties):

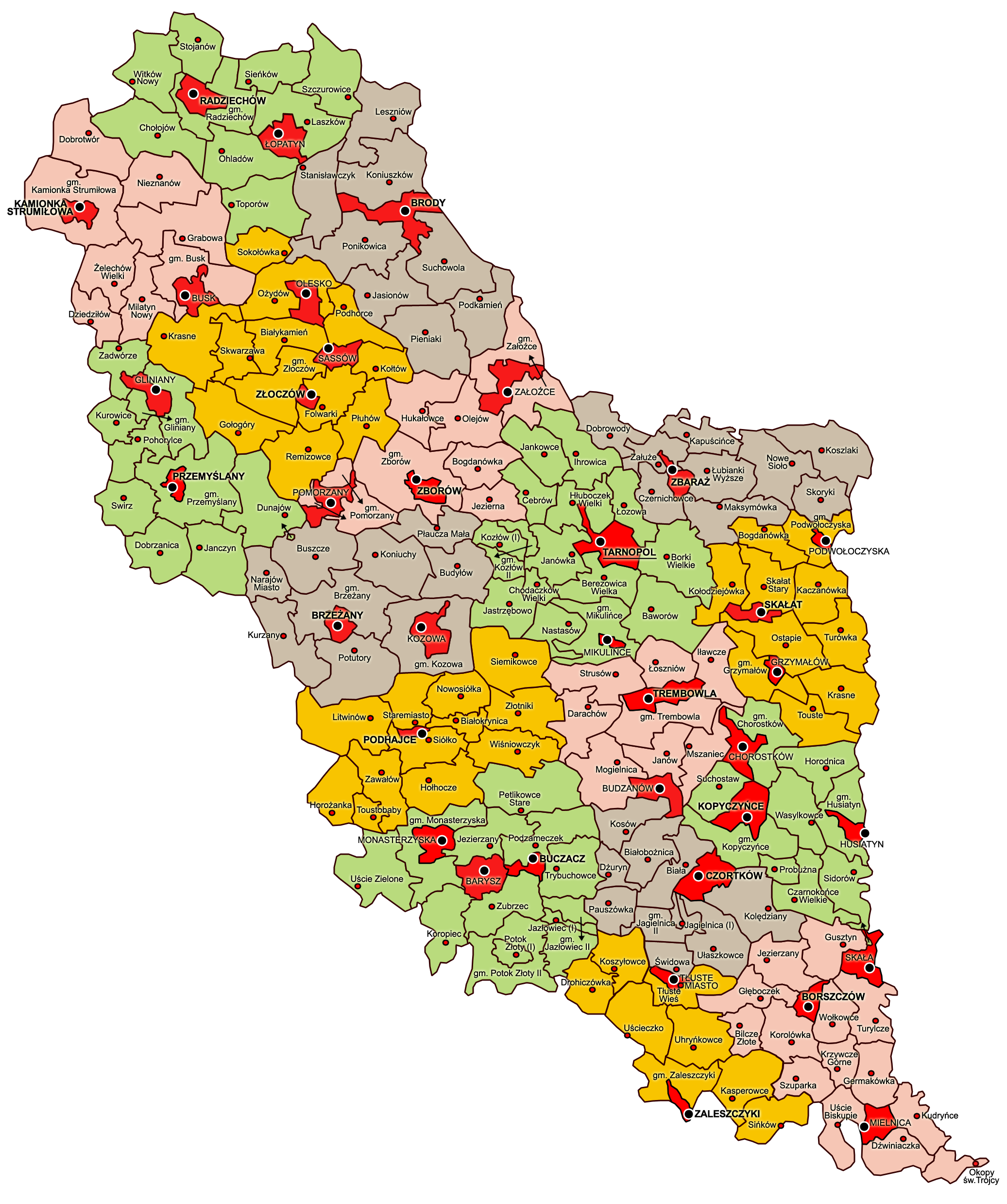
Administrative division, 1938

1. Borszczów Powiat (1067 km^{2}),
2. Brody Powiat (1125 km^{2})
3. Brzeżany Powiat (1135 km^{2})
4. Buczacz Powiat (1208 km^{2})
5. Czortków Powiat (734 km^{2})
6. Kamionka Strumiłowa Powiat (1000 km^{2})
7. Kopyczyńce Powiat (841 km^{2})
8. Podhajce Powiat (1018 km^{2})
9. Przemyślany Powiat (927 km^{2})
10. Radziechów Powiat (1022 km^{2})
11. Skałat Powiat (876 km^{2})
12. Tarnopol Powiat (1231 km^{2})
13. Trembowla Powiat (789 km^{2})
14. Zaleszczyki Powiat (684 km^{2})
15. Zbaraż Powiat (740 km^{2})
16. Zborów Powiat (941 km^{2})
17. Złoczów Powiat (1195 km^{2})

== Economy ==
Tarnopol Voivodeship was located in the so-called Poland "B", which meant that it was underdeveloped, with scarce industry. However, agricultural production was good, due to moderate climate and rich, fertile black soil common in these areas of Europe. The southern part of the voivodship was popular among tourists, with the main center in Zaleszczyki – a border-town, located on the Dniestr, where one could spot grapevines, unique to this part of Poland. The railroad network was better developed in the south, with numerous local connections. Major rail junctions were: Tarnopol, Krasne, Kopczynce. On 1 January 1938, total length of railroads within the Voivodeship's boundaries was 931 kilometers (5.6 km per 100 km²)

== Voivodes ==
- Karol Olpiński, 23 April 1921 – 23 January 1923
- Lucjan Zawistowski, 24 February 1923 – 16 February 1927
- Mikołaj Kwaśniewski, 16 February 1927 – 28 November 1928 (acting till 28 December 1927)
- Kazimierz Moszyński, 28 November 1928 – 10 October 1933
- Artur Maruszewski, 21 October 1933 – 15 January 1935 (acting till 6 March 1934)
- Kazimierz Gintowt-Dziewiałtowski, 19 January 1935 – 15 July 1936 (acting )
- Alfred Biłyk, 15 July 1936 – 16 April 1937
- Tomasz Malicki, 16 April 1937 – 17 September 1939

== See also ==
- Kresy Borderlands
