= Zolochiv Raion =

Subdivision of Lviv Oblast, Ukraine

Zolochiv Raion Золочівський район
- Raion
- Flag Coat of arms

- Coordinates: 49°47′28″N 24°47′38″E
- Country: Ukraine
- Oblast: Lviv Oblast
- Established: 1939
- Admin. center: Zolochiv
- Subdivisions: 7 hromadas

Area
  - Total: 2,888 km^{2} (1,115 sq mi)

Population (2022)
  - Total: 158,943
  - Density: 55.04/km^{2} (142.5/sq mi)
- Time zone: UTC+02:00 (EET)
  - Summer (DST): UTC+03:00 (EEST)
- Postal index: 80700—80762
- Area code: 380-3265
- Website: Zolochiv Raion

Zolochiv Raion (Ukrainian: Золочівський район) is a raion (district) in Lviv Oblast in western Ukraine. Its administrative center is the city of Zolochiv. Population: 158,943 (2022 estimate).

It was established in 1939.

On 18 July 2020, as part of the administrative reform of Ukraine, the number of raions of Lviv Oblast was reduced to seven, and the area of Zolochiv Raion was significantly expanded. Two abolished raions, Brody and Busk Raions, were merged into Zolochiv Raion. At the same time, part of Zolochiv Raion was transferred to Lviv Raion. The January 2020 estimate of the raion population was 68,394 (2020 est.).

== Subdivisions ==
=== Current ===
After the reform in July 2020, the raion consisted of 7 hromadas:

- Brody urban hromada with the administration in the city of Brody, transferred from Brody Raion;
- Busk urban hromada with the administration in the city of Busk, transferred from Busk Raion;
- Krasne settlement hromada with the administration in the urban-type settlement of Krasne, transferred from Busk Raion;
- Pidkamin settlement hromada with the administration in the urban-type settlement of Pidkamin, transferred from Brody Raion;
- Pomoriany settlement hromada with the administration in the urban-type settlement of Pomoriany, retained from Zolochiv Raion;
- Zabolottsi rural hromada with the administration in the selo of Zabolottsi, transferred from Brody Raion;
- Zolochiv urban hromada with the administration in the city of Zolochiv, retained from Zolochiv Raion.

=== Before 2020 ===
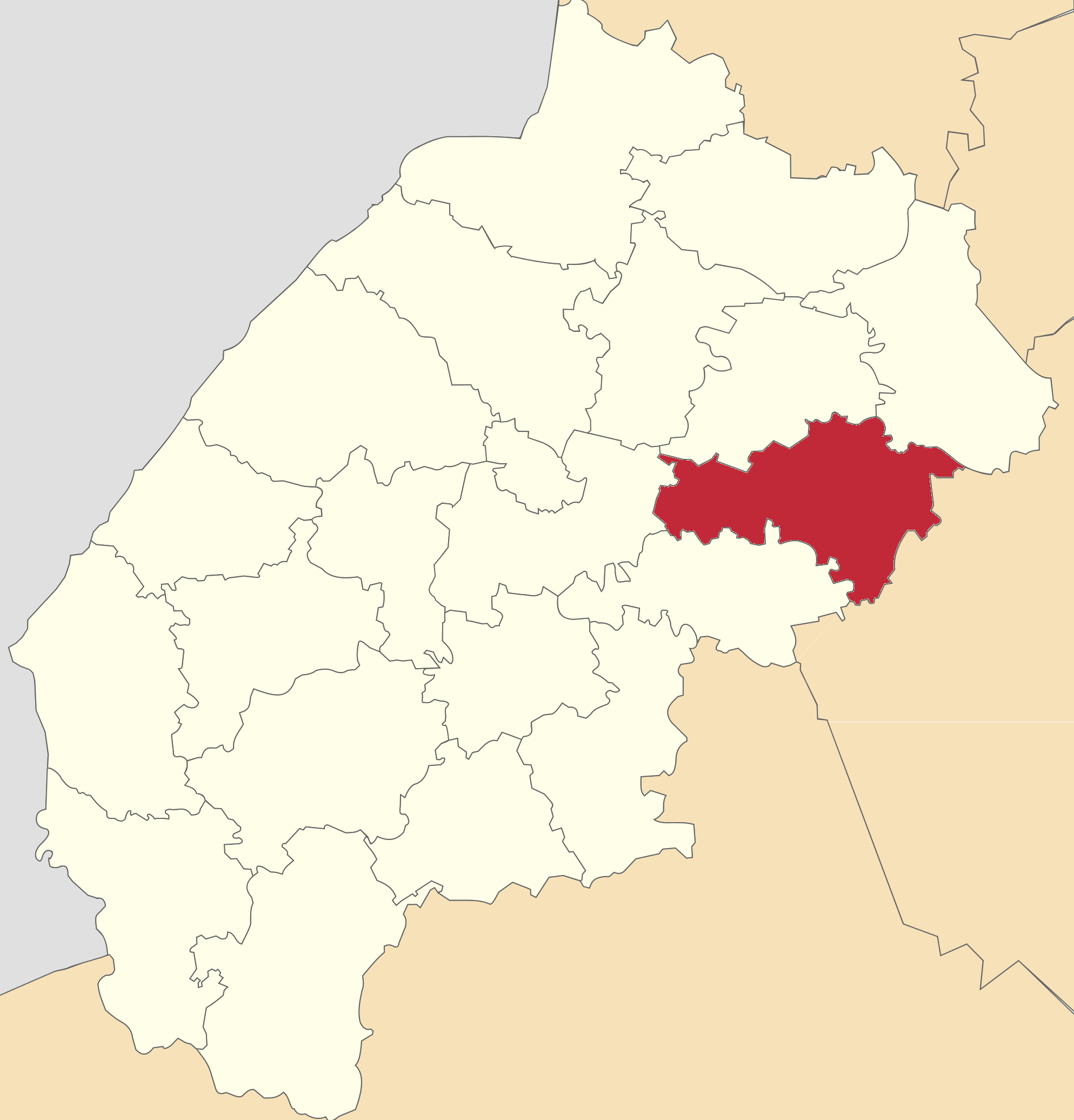
Zolochiv Raion in Lviv Oblast (1966–2020)

Before the 2020 reform, the raion consisted of three hromadas,

- Hlyniany urban hromada with the administration in the city of Hlyniany, transferred to Lviv Raion;
- Pomoriany settlement hromada with the administration in Pomoriany;
- Zolochiv urban hromada with the administration in Zolochiv.

== See also ==
- Administrative divisions of Lviv Oblast
