= Palikrowy massacre =

1944 massacre of Poles during World War II

Coordinates: 49.9122°N 25.3375°E

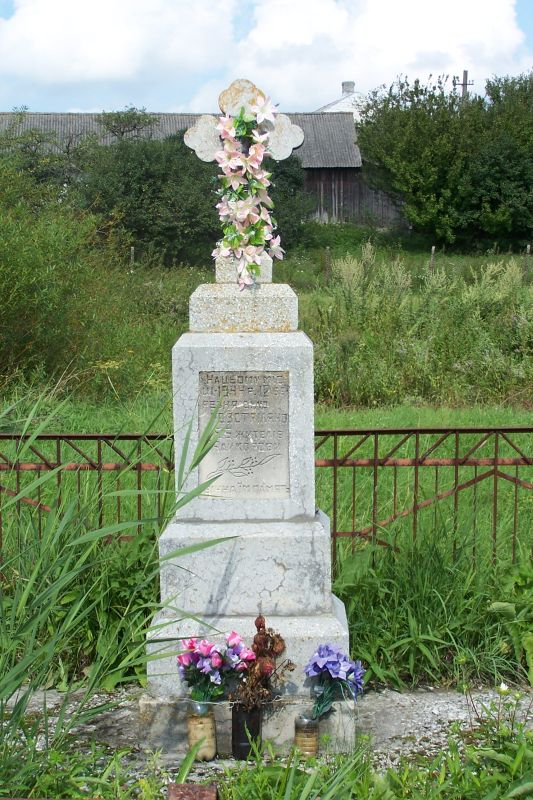
Polish graveyard of victims of the Palikrowy massacre killed by 4th police SS regiment and UPA

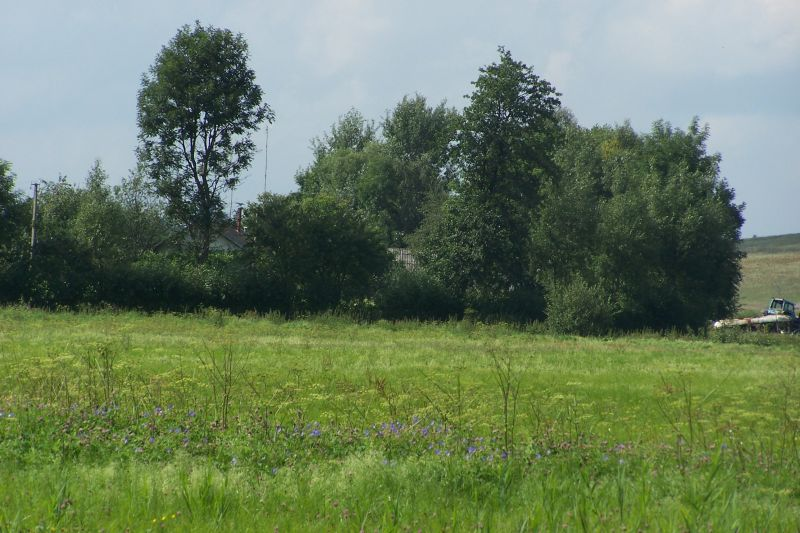
Meadow near village, where 365 Poles were murdered by 4th police SS regiment and UPA

The Palikrowy massacre was a war crime committed by 4th police SS-regiment made up of Ukrainian soldiers of the SS-Galizien who were removed from the SS-Galizien at the time of the massacre and placed under German police command, Ukrainian SVK ("Self-defence", Ukrainian: Samoobronni Kuszczowi Widdiły) forces and Ukrainian Insurgent Army on Poles in the village of Palikrowy (since 1945 Palykorovy), which took place on 12 March 1944. A total of 385 Poles were killed.

Palikrowy was an ethnically mixed village, with 70% Polish population. In 1944, the population was about 1880, with about 360 houses. The action in Palikrowy was coordinated with the attack on nearby Pidkamin including the monastery in Pidkamin, where some of inhabitants from Palikrowy were hiding during the massacre of Poles in Volhynia.

All the inhabitants of Palikrowy were gathered on a meadow near the village. The Ukrainian inhabitants of the village were released. Then the Poles were killed by two heavy machine guns. Only a few wounded people survived. Polish houses were burned down and the hiding Polish civilians were murdered.

== See also ==
- Historiography of the massacres of Poles in Volhynia and Eastern Galicia
- Huta Pieniacka massacre
- Chodaczkow Wielki massacre
- Pidkamin massacre

== Sources ==
- Grzegorz Motyka, Ukraińska Partyzantka 1942–1960, Warszawa 2006
- Per Anders Rudling, They Defended Ukraine’: The 14. Waffen-Grenadier-Division der SS (Galizische Nr. 1) Revisited, The Journal of Slavic Military Studies, 25:3, 329-368 online version
- W. Siemaszko, E. Siemaszko, Ludobójstwo dokonane przez nacjonalistów ukraińskich na ludności polskiej Wołynia 1939–1945, t. II, Von Borowiecky, Warszawa 2000
