= Palykorovy =

Rural locality in Lviv Oblast, Ukraine

- Village
- Location within Ukraine Location within Lviv Oblast
- Country: Ukraine
- Oblast: Lviv
- Raion: Zolochiv
- Area: 1.541 km^{2} (0.595 sq mi)
- Population: 449
  - Density: 291/km^{2} (750/sq mi)

Palykorovy (Ukrainian: Паликорови) is a village (selo) in Zolochiv Raion, Lviv Oblast, in western Ukraine. It belongs to Pidkamin settlement hromada, one of the hromadas of Ukraine. Palykorovy was founded in 1501. The name literally "burn the cows".

From 1918 to 1939 the village was known by its Polish spelling "Palikrowy" as it was then located in the Tarnopol Voivodeship in Poland.

== History ==
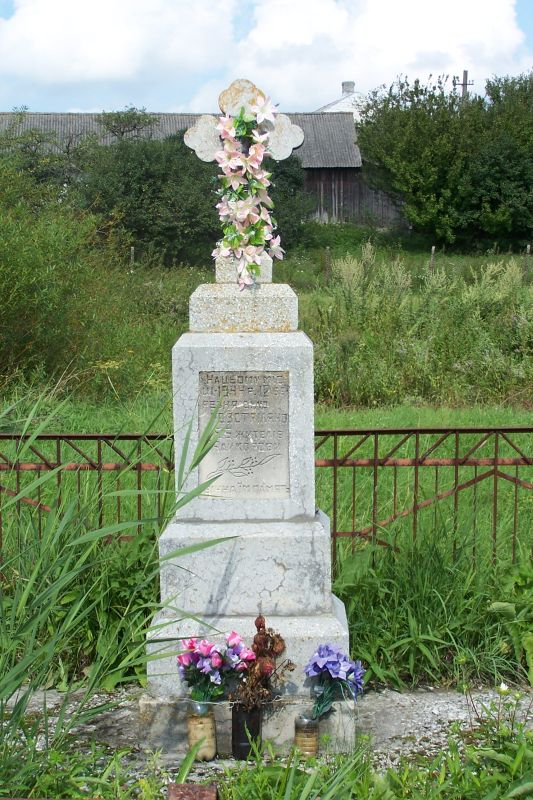
Monument to the Polish victims of ethnic cleansing in Palykorowy

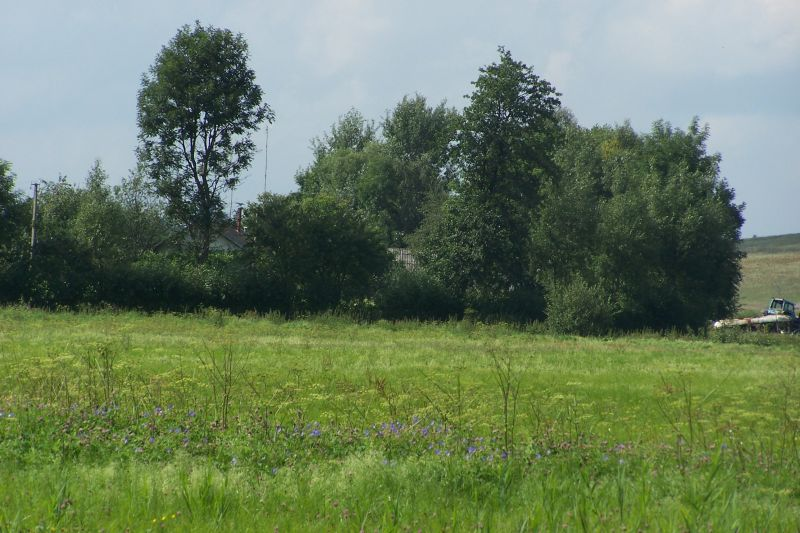
Meadow near village, where the Polish inhabitants were killed

The village was founded in 1501.

On March 12, 1944 an act of ethnic cleansing took place allegedly by SS-Galizien, SVK ("Self-defence"), and Ukrainian Insurgent Army on Poles in the village of Palykorovy. 365 Poles were executed.

Palikrowy was an ethnically mixed village, with 70% Polish population. In 1944, the population was about 1880, with about 360 houses.

On 12 March 1944, village was surrounded by soldiers of SS-Galizien and local SVK and UIA units. Action was coordinated with an attack in nearby Pidkamin including the monastery in Pidkamin, where some of inhabitants from Palykorovy were hiding from the ethnic cleansing actions in Western Ukraine.

The inhabitants from Palykorovy are reported to have gathered in a meadow near village. The Ukrainians were released. Then Polish were executed from two heavy machine guns. Only a few wounded people survived. Polish houses were burned down and hiding Polish civilians were murdered, with their property stolen.

Until 18 July 2020, Palykorovy belonged to Brody Raion. The raion was abolished in July 2020 as part of the administrative reform of Ukraine, which reduced the number of raions of Lviv Oblast to seven. The area of Brody Raion was merged into Zolochiv Raion.

== See also ==
- Historiography of the Volyn tragedy
- Massacres of Poles in Volhynia
- Huta Pieniacka massacre
- Chodaczkow Wielki massacre
- Pidkamin massacre

== Sources ==
- Henryk Komański, Szczepan Siekierka, Ludobójstwo dokonane przez nacjonalistów ukraińskich na Polakach w województwie tarnopolskim w latach 1939-1946; 1182 pages, format B5, 379 illustrations, hard cover
- Grzegorz Motyka, Ukraińska Partyzantka 1942–1960, Warszawa 2006
