= 14th Waffen Grenadier Division of the SS (1st Galician) =

World War II Ukrainian infantry division

- 14. Waffen-Grenadier-Division der SS; 14-та гренадерська дивізія СС
- Active: 1943–1945
- Country: Germany
- Allegiance: Germany; Ukrainian National Committee (from 14 April 1945)
- Branch: Waffen-SS
- Type: Infantry
- Size: Division
- Part of: XIII Army Corps; Replacement Army; I Cavalry Corps; IV SS Panzer Corps; Ukrainian National Army (from 14 April 1945)
- Nicknames: Galicia Division; 1st Ukrainian Division
- Colors: Blue and yellow
- Engagements: World War II; Eastern Front of World War II; Brody cauldron; Vienna offensive; Polish-Ukrainian ethnic conflict; Zamość uprising; Hrubieszów Revolution; Battle of Zabłocie; Battles of Prehoryłe; Battle of Ulhówek and Rzeczyca; Huta Pieniacka massacre; Palikrowy massacre; Slovak National Uprising; World War II in Yugoslavia; World War II in the Slovene Lands; Serbian operations in the Slovene Littoral (1944–1945)

Commanders
- Notable commanders: Walter Schimana; Fritz Freitag; Pavlo Shandruk

The 14th Waffen Grenadier Division of the SS (1st Galician), (Note: German: 14. Waffen-Grenadier-Division der SS (galizische Nr. 1); Ukrainian: 14-та гренадерська дивізія СС «Галичина», romanized: 14-ta hrenaderska dyviziya SS "Halychyna") commonly referred to as the SS Division Galicia or Galicia Division, was a World War II infantry division of the Waffen-SS, the military wing of the German Nazi Party, made up predominantly of volunteers with Ukrainian ethnic background from the area of Galicia, later including some Slovaks.

Formed in 1943, it was mainly deployed in the Eastern Front of World War II in combat against the Red Army and in the repression of Soviet, Polish, and Yugoslav guerrilla partisans. Parts of the division were said to have taken part in several massacres, such as at Huta Pieniacka, Pidkamin, and Palikrowy. It was largely destroyed in the Lvov–Sandomierz offensive, reformed, and saw action in Slovakia, Yugoslavia, and Austria before being transferred to the command of the Ukrainian National Committee on 14 April 1945, a change that was only partially implemented amidst the collapse of Germany, and surrendering to the Western Allies by 10 May 1945.

The unit went by several names during its existence. It was originally known as the SS-Volunteer Division "Galicia" (Note: German: SS-Freiwilligen-Division "Galizien", Ukrainian: Добровільна Дивізія СС "Галичина", romanized: Dobrovilna Dyviziia SS "Halychyna") from its creation until October 1943. It then became the 14th Galician SS-Volunteer Division, before being renamed again in June 1944 as the 14th Waffen Grenadier Division (1st Galician) until November 1944, when its designation was changed to 1st Ukrainian. (Note: German: 14. Waffen-Grenadier-Division der SS (ukrainische Nr. 1)) In late April 1945 its name was changed to the 1st Division of the Ukrainian National Army for the rest of the war.

In 1946, the International Military Tribunal at Nuremberg declared all members of all SS divisions "to be criminal within the meaning of the Charter." In 1985, the Canadian Deschênes Commission concluded that the Galicia division should not be indicted as a group. Polish and German commissions in the 2000s found it guilty of war crimes. In 2003, the Chief Commission for the Prosecution of Crimes against the Polish Nation found that the 4th battalion of the 14th division was guilty of war crimes. In 2005, the Institute of History at the Ukrainian Academy of Sciences confirmed the Polish findings of war crimes committed by the 4th battalion of the 14th division.

The division is honored by the far-right and neo-Nazis in Ukraine and by some organizations of the Ukrainian diaspora in Canada. In 2020, the Ukrainian Supreme Court rejected a demand against the Ukrainian Institute of National Memory for lack of standing of the plaintiff. The plaintiff had asked if the division’s symbols fell under a specific 2015 Ukrainian law that bans Nazi and communist symbols. The Institute replied in a letter that, according to the law's specific wording, the division’s symbols were not on the banned list and therefore were not prohibited. In 2021, Ukrainian president Volodymyr Zelenskyy condemned a public march that prominently displayed the symbols of the division. The division's insignia is classified as a Nazi and hate symbol by Freedom House and the Ukrainian Helsinki Human Rights Union.

== Background ==
=== Status of Galicia ===
The region of Galicia, in modern-day southern Poland and western Ukraine, was part of the Polish-Lithuanian Commonwealth until 1772 and then the Austrian Empire until 1918. It was briefly involved in Ukrainian efforts for national independence in the chaos that followed World War I, between 1918 and 1920, before being made part of Poland. During World War I many volunteers from Galicia joined the Ukrainian Sich Riflemen units of the Austro-Hungarian Army, and they formed a part of the Ukrainian Galician Army, which fought against Poles for control over the region in 1918–1919. The Sich Riflemen were later seen as an inspiration by members of the SS Division Galicia.

The Ukrainian population of Galicia developed a strong national consciousness while the region was an Austrian province, more so than people in the rest of Ukraine, which during that same time period was part of the Russian Empire and then the Soviet Union. The eastern half of Galicia in particular had a majority Ukrainian population along with Polish and Jewish minorities. Regardless, in early 1920 the leaders of the Ukrainian People's Republic, which was being overrun by the Red Army, signed a treaty that gave Poland the entirety of Galicia in exchange for military support against the Soviets. After Polish military victories during the ensuing Polish–Soviet War, another treaty that Poland concluded with the Soviets in 1921 recognized Polish sovereignty in western Ukraine, including all of Galicia. In 1922 the Polish parliament granted autonomy to Eastern Galicia, which led the League of Nations to recognize Poland's control over the region in 1923. The whole area remained part of Poland until the Soviet Union annexed Eastern Galicia in September 1939 under the conditions of the Molotov–Ribbentrop Pact signed with Nazi Germany.

The majority of the western Ukrainian intelligentsia and clergy supported the Ukrainian National Democratic Alliance while the region was part of Poland, a party that stood for democracy and the development of the Ukrainian nation through increasing self-reliance and building up Ukrainian institutions. The other purpose of the party was to represent Ukrainian ethnic interests, and it became the largest Ukrainian party in the Polish parliament. It was opposed to the radical Organization of Ukrainian Nationalists (OUN), whose violent actions were seen by UNDO as counterproductive. After the Soviet annexation the NKVD secret police began mass arrests, murders, and deportations to other parts of the Soviet Union of the Ukrainian intelligentsia in Galicia and other members of the population. These measures lasted for the entire period of Soviet control over the region between 1939 and 1941. The leaders of the Ukrainian National Democratic Alliance were among those arrested and deported, and the party's dissolution by the Soviets left the OUN as the only functional Ukrainian political organization remaining in Galicia, since it was already an underground movement because of its conflict with the Polish government in the 1920s and 1930s.

=== German invasion and occupation ===
There was cooperation between members of the Organization of Ukrainian Nationalists living in Germany and the Abwehr, the German military intelligence service led by Wilhelm Canaris, starting before the German invasion of Poland. The willingness of the German military to work with Ukrainian nationalists led them to believe that Germany would recognize Ukrainian independence in the future in exchange for their assistance. An OUN battalion accompanied German forces into Poland in September 1939, but when Germany allowed the Soviet Union to occupy Eastern Galicia, the battalion was withdrawn by its leadership. The OUN itself was led by Andriy Melnyk from August 1939, though part of its local branch in Galicia had disagreements with him, and in February 1940 that faction broke away under the leadership of Stepan Bandera. Bandera's faction, the OUN-B, started working with the Germans in the spring of 1941 and established two battalions, known as "Nachtigall" and "Roland Battalion." They were used by the Wehrmacht, though the OUN was responsible for their training and political leadership. Melnyk's faction, the OUN-M, also formed its own unit with the Germans, the Bukovinian Battalion. Both had the intent to eventually participate in a German invasion of Soviet Ukraine and seize power.

Germany launched its invasion of the Soviet Union, Operation Barbarossa, on 22 June 1941. Adolf Hitler decided to invade to destroy Communism and to obtain Lebensraum, living space, for Germany in the east, as well as to gain access to more natural resources. The Nazi Party regarded Ukrainians and other Slavs as subhumans, and therefore when the OUN-B leaders reached the Galician capital Lviv on 30 June 1941 and declared an independent government of Ukraine, they were arrested by the security service of the SS. The same happened to Melnyk and his faction before they could declare a government in Kiev. Both Melnyk and Bandera were kept under arrest by the Germans until 1944, and the Germans spent the summer and fall of 1941 detaining OUN leaders and members of the Ukrainian intelligentsia. The OUN units with the Wehrmacht became fully integrated as Schutzmannschaft Battalion 201 and were sent to occupied Belarus for anti-partisan operations until late 1942, before disagreements between them and the Germans led the battalion to be dissolved. Its leader, Roman Shukhevych, and several other members founded the underground Ukrainian Insurgent Army (UPA) in January 1943 after returning to Ukraine. The OUN and the UPA declared their opposition to both Germany and the Soviet Union.

== Formation and support ==
Celebrating its formation (top) and a recruitment center.

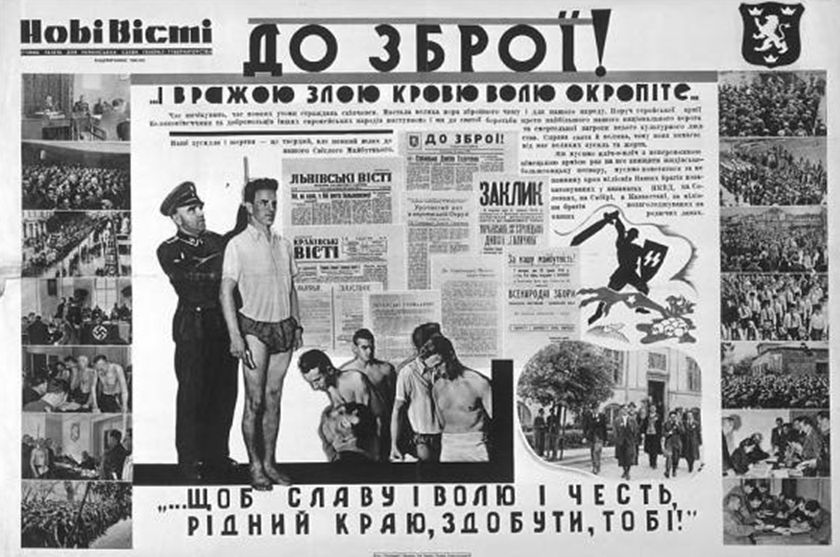
The division's recruitment poster from its newspaper.

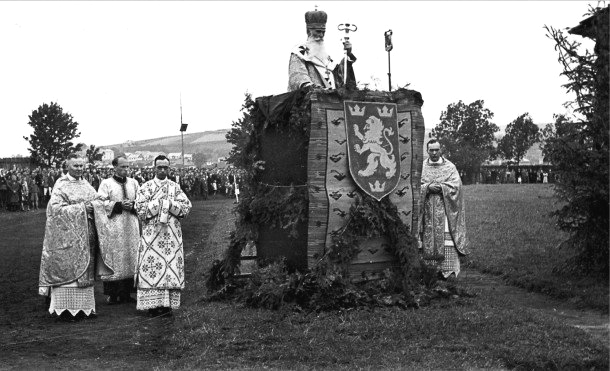
Catholic Bishop Josaphat Kotsylovsky addressing the division volunteers.

The idea of recruiting Ukrainians into the Waffen-SS was first proposed by Gottlob Berger, the head of the SS Main Office, as early as April 1941. His request was rejected by Reichsführer-SS Heinrich Himmler for racial reasons.

It was not brought up again until 1942 by Otto Wächter, who had been appointed as the second German governor of Galicia in August 1941. Wächter sympathized with the Ukrainian population, many of whom initially saw the Germans as liberators after the previous years of Soviet oppression, and believed that Germany could work with them against the Soviets. Wächter's governance of Galicia, which was part of the General Government (occupied Poland), was more lenient than Erich Koch, who led the rest of Ukrainian territory as the head of Reichskommissariat Ukraine. As a former part of the Austrian empire, Galicia was governed separately from the rest of Ukraine, and was also the only region where Ukrainians were allowed to participate in its administration in a significant way. Wächter wanted to make the region an example for changing German policy toward Ukraine. In early 1943 Wächter discussed the matter of a Ukrainian SS division with Himmler, and received Himmler's approval for the basic idea on 28 March 1943.

At a conference of SS officials held by Wächter on 12 April 1943, they came to an agreement regarding the details of the new division. He proposed the name of the unit to be SS-Volunteer Division "Galicia" (Himmler insisted against using "Ukrainian" in the name), and that it be given standard Waffen-SS field-grey uniforms with the addition of a patch on the right arm sleeve bearing the Galician regional symbol. The Galician lion was used as the division insignia instead of the Ukrainian trident. He added that the division would also have chaplains from the Ukrainian Greek Catholic Church because Galicia's population was very religious. Various logistical matters related to the unit were discussed, as well as methods of recruitment and propaganda. A recruitment committee was established along with a military board consisting of Ukrainian military veterans and other Ukrainian advisors. A ceremony was held in Lviv on 28 April 1943 where Wächter announced the creation of the Galicia Division. He received Himmler's final approval shortly after that, despite the opposition of Erich Koch to any Ukrainian military units being formed. Himmler also believed that Galician Ukrainians were more Germanized because they had been part of the Austrian empire, and that the Galicians were more "Aryan-like." Thus it became the second non-Germanic division in the Waffen-SS, after the 13th Division.

In July 1943, Wächter argued with Himmler about his order forbidding the use of "Ukrainian" in the name to discourage Ukrainian statehood, but Himmler stood firm and insisted on calling the division members "Galicians" instead of Ukrainians. The regional symbol of Galicia was used as the division insignia because it was not seen as associated with Ukrainian nationalism. The SS sig runes were officially not supposed to be worn, as non-Germanic members of the Waffen-SS were supposed to wear their division insignia instead.

Besides obtaining the approval of Himmler and the SS hierarchy, Wächter also worked with Ukrainian community leaders in Galicia, finding widespread support for the division among them. One of these figures was Volodymyr Kubiyovych, the head of the Ukrainian Central Committee. The Ukrainian Central Committee was established in June 1940 in German-occupied Western Galicia with the approval of the German authorities. It had no political status and was meant to organize social and welfare services for the western Ukrainian population, including by cooperating with the International Red Cross, and throughout the occupation it appealed to German officials to minimize or prevent brutal policies from being imposed. The organization's motivation for supporting the Galicia Division included the desire to create a Ukrainian military force, and given that Ukrainians were already being used by Germany, it would be better if they were concentrated in a single Ukrainian unit.

In return for his support, Kubiyovych obtained assurances from Wächter that the division would be allowed to have chaplains of the Ukrainian Greek Catholic Church, that it would only be used against communist forces on the Eastern Front (and not for Germany's internal security), have Ukrainian officers, and its soldiers would be given the same benefits as other Wehrmacht and SS personnel. Kubiyovych said after the war that the Germans largely met his demands. The Germans also made another concession, by adding the phrase to the division's oath of loyalty to Adolf Hitler that it was in his role as "the Commander-in-Chief of the German Armed Forces in the struggle against Bolshevism."

Kubiyovych made a proclamation calling on Ukrainians to join the Galicia Division in order to "destroy the Red monster." The Ukrainian Greek Catholic Church supported its creation. The head of the Church, Metropolitan Andrey Sheptytsky, reportedly told Kubiyovych that "there is virtually no price which should not be paid for the creation of a Ukrainian army." The Ukrainian Autocephalous Orthodox Church was also in favor. At the same time, it was met with a mixed reaction from the underground Ukrainian nationalist movement. The Galicia Division was supported by Andriy Melnyk's moderate faction of the OUN, who saw it as a counterweight to the extremist Banderite-dominated UPA, and by some officers of the former Ukrainian People's Republic, such as General Mykhailo Omelianovych-Pavlenko.

The unit was initially opposed by the OUN-B and the UPA. A bulletin published by them in May 1943 criticized the creation of a German-led Ukrainian division, as it would deprive their nationalist movement of potential recruits by using them as cannon fodder, and went on to say that it represented colonialism, comparing the idea to the British Indian Army. The bulletin also said the creation of the Galicia Division would undermine the prestige of the idea of a Ukrainian state. The OUN-B was not in contact with the Ukrainian Central Committee and had no involvement in the division's creation. Roman Shukhevych's UPA discouraged young men in Galicia from joining it and instead tried to recruit them for their guerilla army. But the UPA later changed its position out of pragmatism. The organization lacked trained recruits and had a shortage of resources that prevent it from becoming a significant force. Therefore, Shukhevych secretly met with a Ukrainian member of Wächter's military board in early October 1943. In the meeting they arranged to send UPA volunteers into the division to receive training, weapons, and intelligence, taking advantage of the Galicia Division as much as they could for the movement's benefit, before having them desert and rejoin the UPA. Shukhevych also said he respected the decision of anyone who joined the Galicia Division and considered them to be Ukrainian patriots.

== Recruitment and composition ==
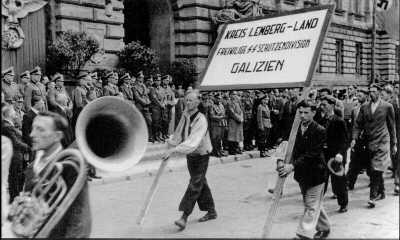
Parade of recruits in Lviv.

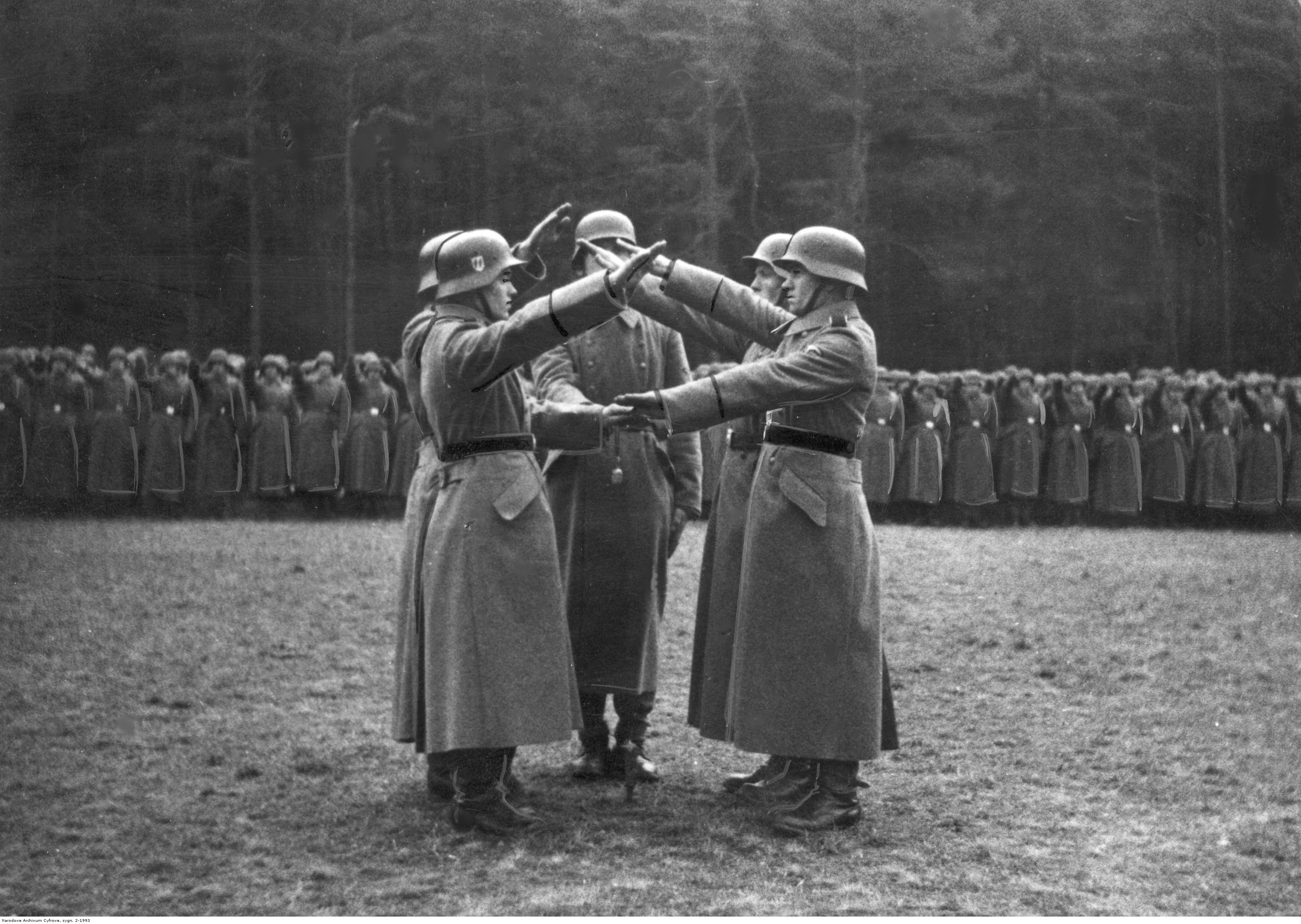
Soldiers of the SS-Volunteer Division Galicia being sworn in.

In early May 1943 the recruitment process slowly began. Rallies were held across cities and towns in Galicia for two months, and by mid-1943, as the division received support from retired Ukrainian officers and the UPA, recruitment picked up. Colonel Alfred Bysanz, a former Austro-Hungarian officer with German and Ukrainian ancestry, was put in charge of recruitment. After the first three months of the recruitment drive, 80,000 men had been enrolled for the SS Division Galicia, out of whom 53,000 met the basic eligibility requirements. About 25,000 were deemed fit for service and 13,245 passed the medical examination. They were sent to training; 1,487 were dropped during the training period, leaving the division with 11,758 personnel. Those volunteers were mostly between the ages of 18 and 30, many from a middle class professional background or from farming families. Most of the soldiers in the division were Ukrainian Greek Catholics, with the exception of a small number of Ukrainian Orthodox. The archpriest Vasyl Laba, a close associate of Greek Catholic Metropolitan Andrey Sheptytsky, became the head chaplain of the division, and it initially had a total of twelve chaplains.

Ukrainians with previous experience as officers or NCOs were conscripted into the Galicia Division when it was established. These Ukrainian officers had previously served in the Russian Imperial Army, the army of the Ukrainian People's Republic, the Polish Army, the Red Army, the Wehrmacht (including the former Nachtigall and Roland battalions), or the Austro-Hungarian Army. In addition to these, 1,000 of the Ukrainian recruits who enlisted in 1943 who had had higher education were sent to officer or NCO training schools. Most of the Ukrainian officers remained at the company level or below. Dmytro Paliiv, who was a veteran of the Sich Riflemen, was appointed the Ukrainian political advisor to the Galicia Division's German commander.

The division was led by a German commander and a staff of German officers at the senior levels. All of them except the chief of staff were brought over from the SS police division of the Waffen-SS. The longest serving division commander, SS-Brigadeführer and Major General of Waffen-SS Fritz Freitag, was reluctant to give more authority to Ukrainian officers since they did not have recent combat experience, which caused tensions between the Germans and the Ukrainians. Freitag was a committed National Socialist and was focused on instilling the Ukrainians with "the Prussian spirit" to turn the Galicia Division into an effective fighting force. The division's chief of staff from January 1944 until the end of the war, Wehrmacht Major Wolf-Dietrich Heike, noted that there was a shortage of German officers and NCOs, and that many of them were unsuited for working with the Ukrainians because of cultural differences.

Based on postwar studies and veteran accounts after the war, the most common motivation for Ukrainian volunteers in the division was the idea that at some point it would become part of a Ukrainian national army established for the purpose of achieving Ukraine's independence. During the Interwar period much of the population of Galicia and its political class wanted to have their own army, ever since the existence of Ukrainian Sich Riflemen in World War I and the later Ukrainian People's Republic.

Four police regiments were also formed from some of those who volunteered for the Galicia Division but did not meet the basic military requirements; they were given the name Galician SS Volunteer Regiments 4 through 7 (German: Galizische SS-Freiwilligen Regiment). These were completely separate from the division and were under the Ordnungspolizei (Order Police) of the SS. In the spring of 1944 the police regiments were dissolved and their personnel were combined into the Galicia Division.

== Training ==
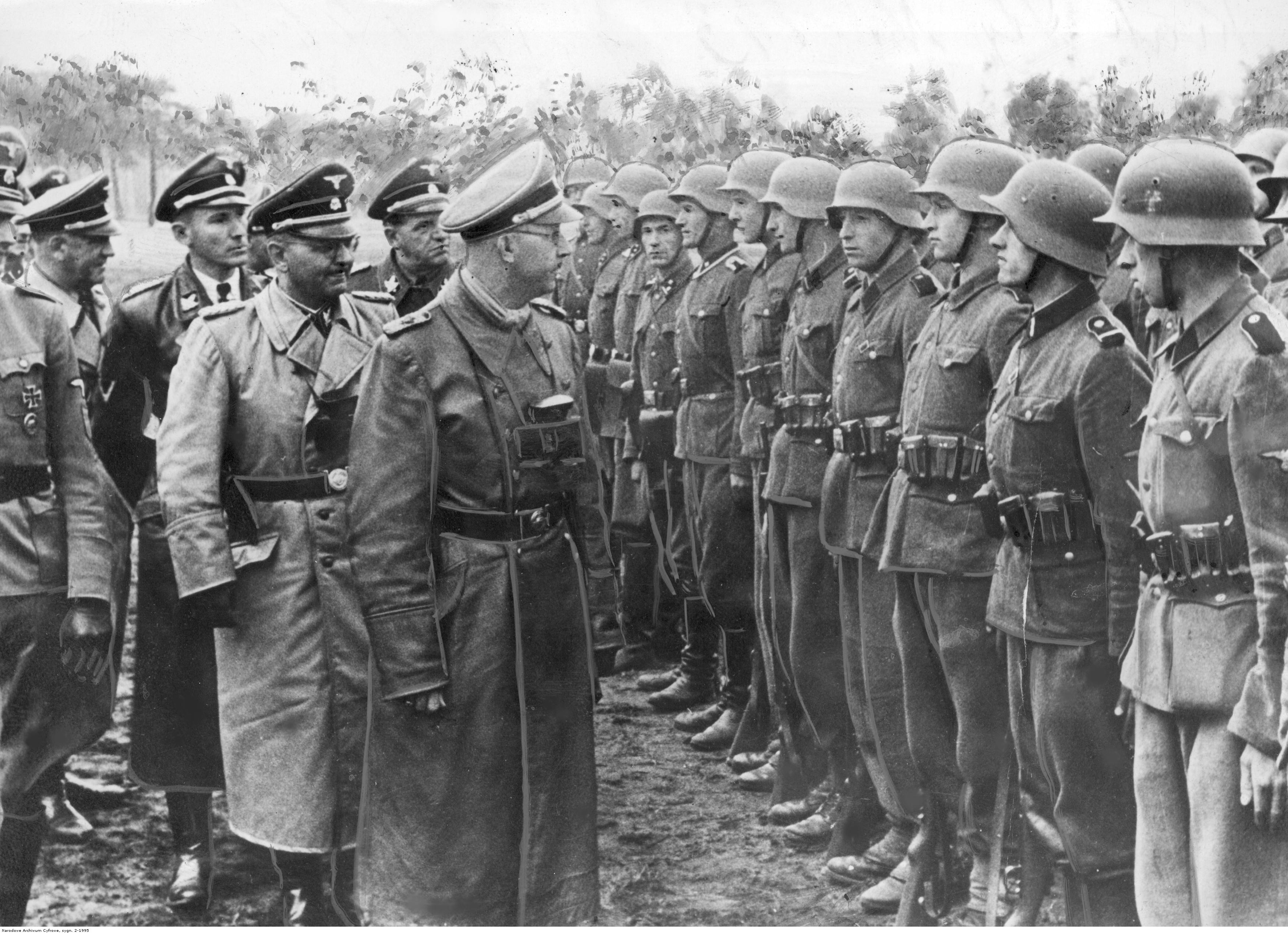
Heinrich Himmler inspecting the Galicia Division in May 1944. Otto Wächter is in the background.

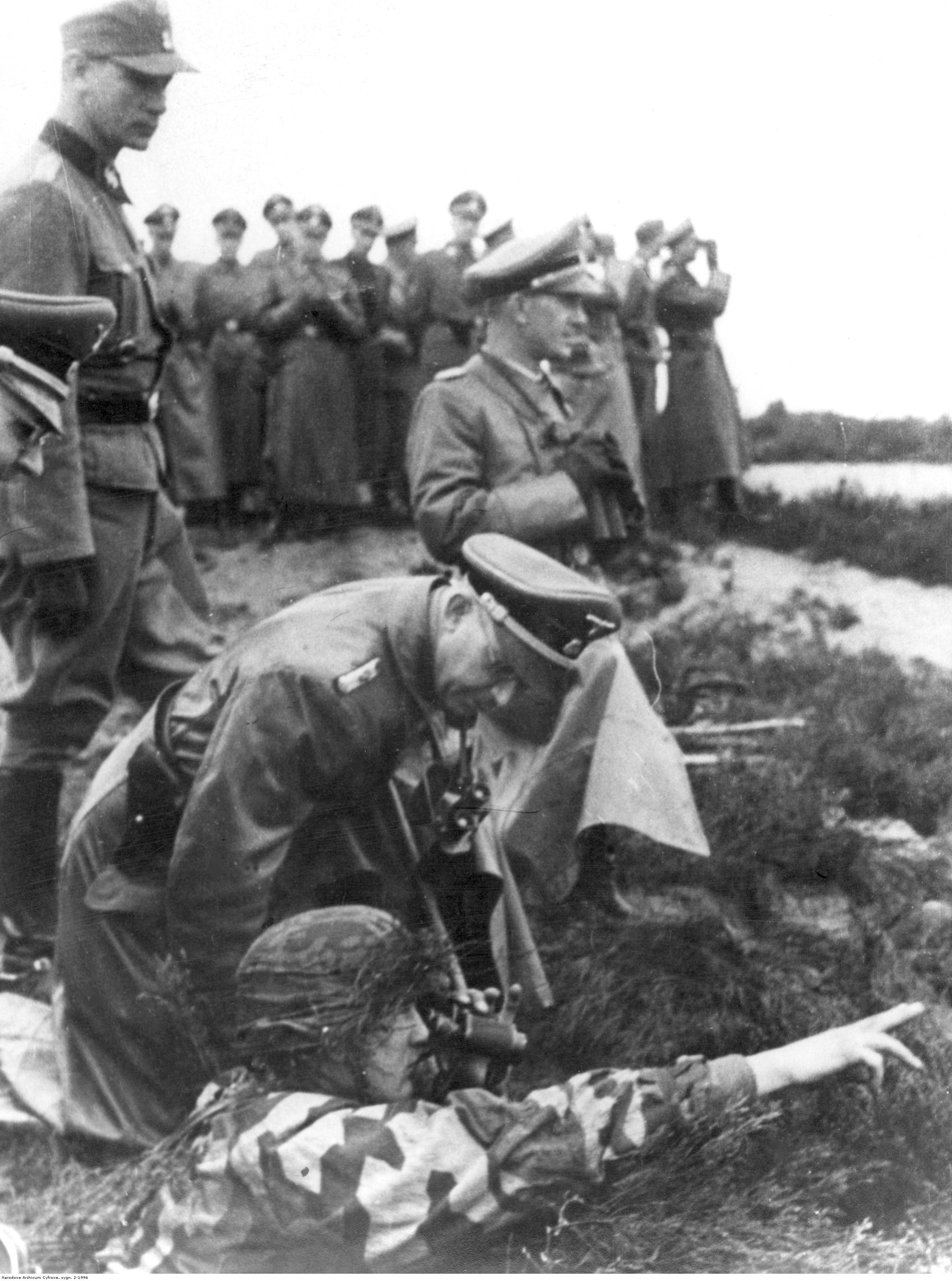
Himmler speaks to a Ukrainian soldier at the training camp.

The recruits began leaving for training on 18 July 1943, and they were seen off by a rally of over 50,000 people in Lviv. Around this time the division received its first commanding officer, SS-Brigadeführer and Major General of Waffen-SS Walter Schimana, who for the entirety of his tenure was away on training courses and whose command was only on paper. The training was initially done at the Heidelager camp in the General Government. They were given instruction in combat tactics, rifle, and heavy weapons training. Personnel who required specialized training in different fields (such as anti-tank warfare, communications, animal equipment maintenance, or combat engineering), and those who were selected to become officers, NCOs, or chaplains, were sent to various other locations throughout Europe before returning to the rest of the division. The German instructors noted that the Ukrainian recruits were enthusiastic and dedicated. During their training the recruits also received two hours per week of political education by company commanders in National Socialism, which aimed to instill in them the belief in the victory of the Third Reich.

In September 1943 part of the division's headquarters staff was established under the command of Walter Schimana, before Fritz Freitag succeeded Schimana as the division commander on 20 October 1943. Also in October the division was renamed and its units were renumbered in accordance with a reorganization of Waffen-SS units. Now the 14th Galician SS-Volunteer Division, it consisted of three 'grenadier' (infantry) regiments and an assortment of specialized units, though they were not yet at full strength. In the last months of 1943 and early 1944 the division received additional troops from disbanded police regiments and from new volunteers. In January 1944, Freitag left for several weeks to attend a training course for division commanders, and in his absence the commanding officer was SS-Standartenführer and Colonel of Waffen-SS Friedrich Beyersdorff, who was normally the commander of the divisional artillery. In early February, the division sent a company to Lviv to serve as an honor guard at the funeral of two of the Galicia governor's senior staff members who had been assassinated.

Shortly after Freitag departed, in mid-February 1944 the division received an order to form a Kampfgruppe (battlegroup) of one infantry regiment and one detachment each of artillery, sappers, anti-tank grenadiers to go into combat against Sydir Kovpak's Soviet partisan group, which entered Poland from Belarus. Beyersdorff believed the division was unprepared, but complied with the order, because it came from the Higher SS and Police Leader in Kraków, Wilhelm Koppe.

In the final phase of its training and assembling the division was sent to the Neuhammer training camp in Lower Silesia, in April 1944. The Kampfgruppe Beyersdorff detachment rejoined the rest of the division in Neuhammer in mid-March 1944. At this time the division reportedly had 12,901 members. At the new location the division was joined by Ukrainian officers and NCOs who had completed their training elsewhere, along with new recruits from Galicia, and completed its assembling. In mid-May 1944, Heinrich Himmler visited Neuhammer to inspect the division. During that time he gave a speech to the Galicia Division's officers in which he acknowledged them as Ukrainian (as opposed to Galician), saying that he should have designated the division Ukrainian from the beginning, and that the German and Ukrainian members must be treated as equals. After his inspection, Himmler informed the commander of Army Group North Ukraine that the Galicia Division was ready to be sent into battle. In mid-June they were also visited by the leaders of the Ukrainian Central Committee. Towards the end of the month, it was decided that the division would be deployed to the area of western Ukraine being held by the 4th Panzer Army. On 27 June 1944, it was renamed the 14th Waffen Grenadier Division of the SS (1st Galician). They departed from Neuhammer towards western Ukraine on the following day, 28 June 1944.

== First combat deployment ==
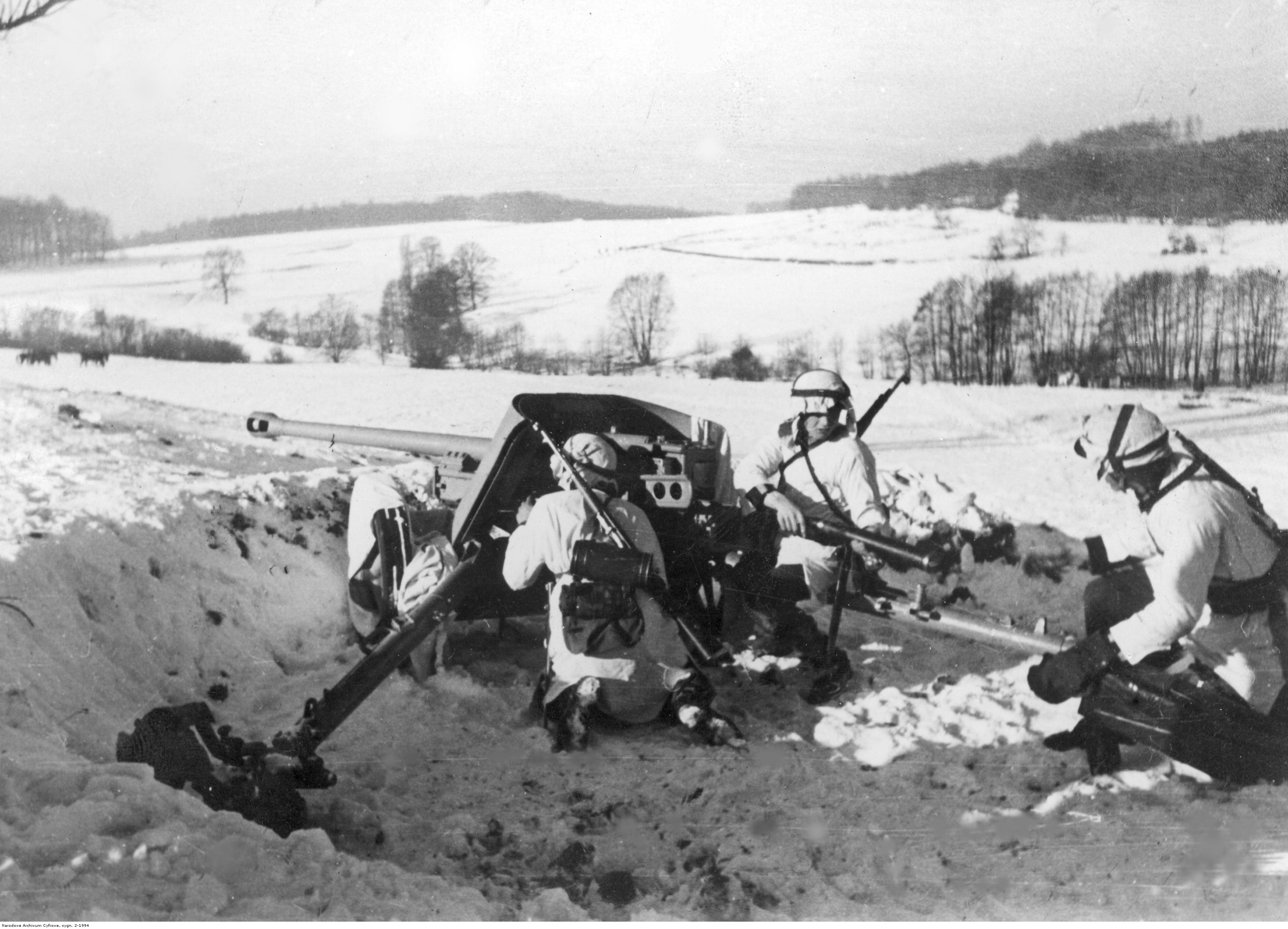
Galicia Division soldiers with a 5 cm Pak 38 anti-tank gun.

=== Anti-partisan actions ===
About 2,000 Galicia Division soldiers were deployed as Kampfgruppe Beyersdorff to the Biłgoraj–Zamość area in southeast Poland. The formation was divided into two smaller groups, with one of them being sent to Lviv, and commenced anti-partisan operations against Soviet guerilla fighters from 28 February until 27 March 1944. They attacked a partisan group, inflicting casualties, and discovered hidden weapons caches. About 20 to 25 Galicia Division soldiers were killed. The Kampfgruppe Beyersdorff performed its duty well enough that it earned the rare praise of German Field Marshal Walter Model.

=== Brody ===
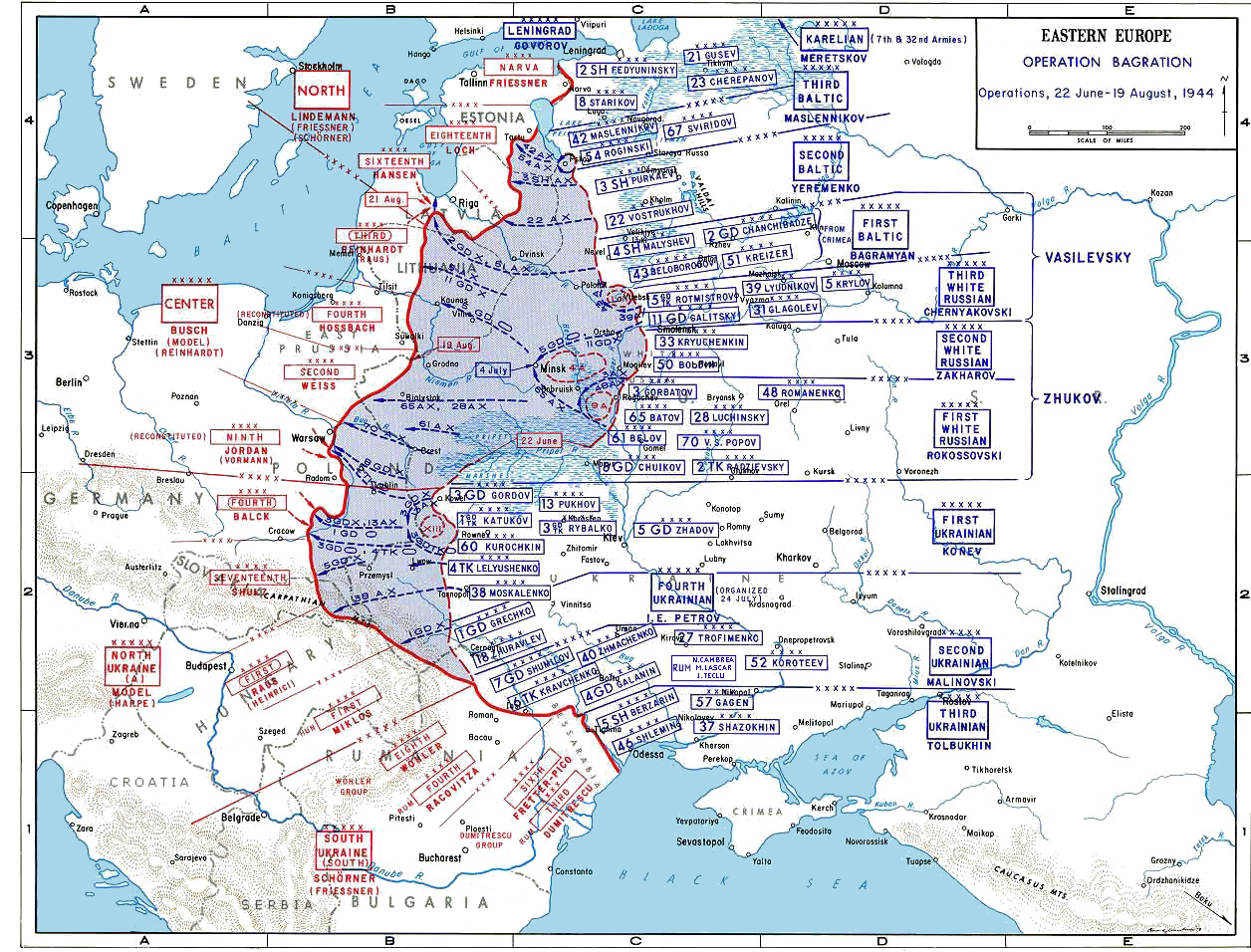
Soviet offensives in the summer of 1944. XIII Army Corps is shown encircled in the south.

By the summer of 1944 the Soviets were on the offensive across the Eastern Front while Germany attempted to hold on to the territory it still had. Most of Ukraine had been retaken by the Red Army, but the majority of Belarus and the Baltic states remained under German control. In the spring the Soviets began pushing into the regions of western Ukraine that had been part of Poland before the war.

On 15 May 1944, the 1st Ukrainian Front was established under Soviet Marshal Ivan Konev for the purpose of breaking through German lines in Galicia and western Ukraine. It was opposed by Germany's Army Group North Ukraine, which was tasked with holding the area between the Pripyat Marshes and the Carpathian Mountains. Although the German army group consisted of over 40 divisions, they were under-strength, and its best armored units had been redeployed in June 1944 to France, where the Western Allies had landed that same month. The 1st Ukrainian Front vastly outnumbered Army Group North Ukraine in infantry, tanks, and artillery. The Galicia Division was ordered to reinforce them, joining the XIII Army Corps, which was transferred from the 4th Panzer Army to the 1st Panzer Army around that time.

In July 1944, together with six German infantry divisions, the Galicia Division was responsible for holding a front of approximately 80 kilometres (50 mi) near the town of Brody. When the Soviets launched their offensive, the division was initially in reserve. Deployed at Brody were the division's 29th, 30th, 31st Waffen-Grenadier regiments, a fusilier and an engineering battalion, along with its artillery regiment. The Field Replacement Battalion was deployed fifteen miles (24 kilometres) behind the other units.

On 13 July, the Soviet forces launched their attack. By the next day, they had routed a German division (the 291st) to the north of the XIII Corps and swept back an attempted German counterattack. On 15 July, the 1st and 8th Panzer Divisions along with a single regiment from the Galicia Division (the 30th) were deployed in a counterattack against the Soviet penetration in the Koltiv area, while the Soviet 2nd Air Army flew aircraft sorties and bombed them as they attempted their counterattack. On 18 July, the division's Field Replacement Battalion largely escaped the encirclement and were reported as having fled west, whilst the remainder of XIII Corps, consisting of over 30,000 German and Ukrainian soldiers, was surrounded by the Soviets within the Brody pocket.

Within the pocket, the Galician troops were tasked with defending the eastern perimeter near the Pidhirtsi Castle and Olesko. The Soviets wanted to collapse the Brody pocket by focusing their attack at what they perceived to be its weakest point; this was not the Galicia Division but the 349th Infantry Division, which suffered heavy losses in the initial Soviet offensive, causing the Galicia Division to be sent to reinforce its sector of the front. The 29th and 30th regiments of the Galicia Division, supported by the division's artillery regiment, put up unexpectedly fierce resistance. Pidhirtsi changed hands several times before the Galicians were finally overwhelmed by the late afternoon, and at Olesko a major Soviet attack using T-34 tanks was repulsed by the division's Fusilier and Engineer battalions.

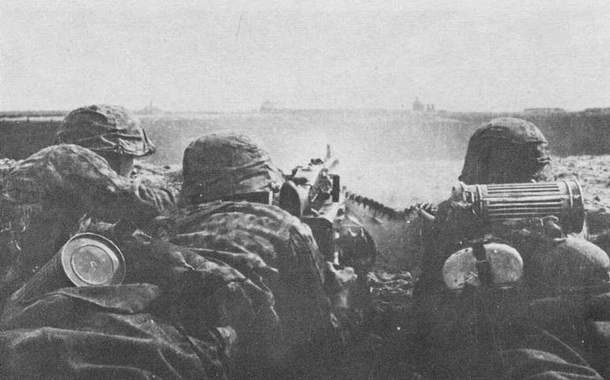
Galicia Division soldiers in 1944.

On 20 July, the German divisions within the pocket attempted a breakout which failed partly because rain on the previous day had made the roads impassable for the armour of III Panzer Corps which was striking north to relieve the entrapped forces, despite early successes. By this point the Division's 30th and 31st regiments had been destroyed. A second German breakout attempt that began on 21 July ended in failure, but ten miles (16 kilometres) to the west of the pocket, the 8th Panzer Division broke through Soviet lines and briefly established contact with the Brody pocket. They sent a message on 21 July to the 1st Panzer Army headquarters that thousands of men from the pocket were rescued before they were repulsed.

By the end of that day, in the face of overwhelming Soviet attacks, the 14th Galician Division as a whole disintegrated. Late on 19 July its German commander, Fritz Freitag, resigned his command and was called in for service with XIII Corps staff. Command of all remaining units was then given to General Gerhard Lindemann. Freitag remained with the Corps staff while Lindemann organized the withdrawal of the Galicia Division remnants to the south. Some Ukrainian assault groups remained intact, others joined German units, and others fled or melted away. The Ukrainian 14th SS Fusilier battalion, which at this point had also largely disintegrated, came to form the rearguard of what was left of the entire XIII Corps. Holding the town of Bilyi Kamin, it enabled units or stragglers to escape to the south and was able to withstand several Soviet attempts to overwhelm it. By the evening of 21 July, it remained the only intact unit north of the Bug River even though several of its former members recorded that by 19 July there was chaos in the fusilier battalion, and it was running out of ammunition.

In the early morning of 22 July, the 14th Fusilier battalion abandoned Bilyi Kamin. The Brody pocket was now only 4 to 5 miles (6.4–8.0 kilometres) long and wide. The German and Ukrainian soldiers were instructed to attack with everything they had by moving forward until they broke through or were destroyed. Fighting was fierce and desperate. The German and Ukrainian soldiers surging south were able to overwhelm the Soviet 91st Separate Tank Brigade and its infantry support, and to escape by the thousands. The remaining pocket collapsed by the evening of 22 July.

== Rebuilding and second deployment ==
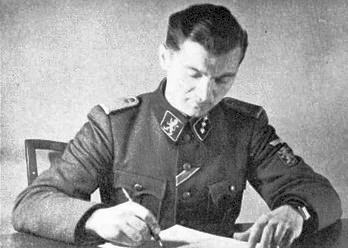
Mykhailo Levenets, a chaplain in the division uniform with the Galician lion patch and collar, and the Untersturmführer rank collar.

Out of the around 11,000 soldiers in the Galicia Division who fought at Brody, ultimately only around 3,400 escaped the encirclement and returned to German lines. The others were killed or taken prisoner by the Soviets, and some of the survivors decided to escape and join the Ukrainian Insurgent Army (UPA). Another source estimated that an additional 2,000 survived, but in the retreat either joined the UPA or were combined into other German units, before returning to the Galicia Division weeks later. Freitag resumed his role as the commander of the Ukrainian survivors who made it out of the pocket and retreated west with the remnants of XIII Corps. The German high command believed that the Ukrainians had performed well given the conditions at Brody. Freitag and his chief of staff met with Himmler, who had taken a personal interest in the Galicia Division, in Berlin after the battle. Himmler defended the Ukrainians' performance in the battle when Freitag proposed that the division be disbanded, and gave the order to rebuild the Galicia Division on 8 August 1944. The survivors entered the Hungarian Carpathian Mountains, along with remnants of the 8th Panzer Division and the 18th SS Division Horst Wessel, where they rested for a short time before going to the Neuhammer training camp for the rebuilding of the Galicia Division.

The surviving veterans were combined with 8,000 men who had come from the division's Training and Reserve Regiment, and the officer and NCO candidates who had completed their training courses around that time. More German officers and NCOs were also added to the Galicia Division. Many of the reassigned Germans were Volksdeutsche from Hungary and Slovakia. More volunteers from Galicia were accepted into the division as well, though they were different from those who had joined in 1943. Many of them joined for reasons other than Ukrainian nationalist sentiment, such as to escape from the difficult conditions in Galicia, and had very little interest in the Ukrainian national cause. The training of the new recruits was also of lower quality, due to the lack of time, equipment, and ammunition. After the division was rebuilt, it reportedly had 286 officers and 13,999 NCOs and soldiers. On 30 September 1944, Freitag was awarded the Knight's Cross of the Iron Cross for his role as the Galicia Division commander at the Battle of Brody.

In late August 1944, a rebellion broke out in Slovakia against the pro-German government of President Jozef Tiso. It involved 20,000 Slovak Army troops and local guerilla fighters, along with Soviet partisans and paratroopers who were airlifted into Slovakia. On 22 September 1944, the Galicia Division was ordered to send a battlegroup to Slovakia to assist German forces in putting down the Slovak Uprising, before 28 September, when the entire division was ordered to go. The battlegroup, led by SS-Obersturmbannführer Karl Wildner, consisted of one battalion from the 29th Regiment and several companies of support troops.

From 28 July to 3 November 1944, a detachment of 1,000 Ukrainian soldiers from the Galicia Division's Training and Reserve Regiment was dispatched to central Poland, in the Legionowo and Warsaw area, where it was used to reinforce the under-strength 5th SS Panzer Division Wiking, a mixed German-Scandinavian-Dutch-Flemish unit in the IV SS Panzer Corps. They fought against the troops of the 1st and 2nd Belarusian Fronts. In early November the 700 of them who were still alive rejoined the rest of the Galicia Division in Slovakia. They were commended for their performance by the Wiking Division commander, SS-Oberführer Karl Ullrich.

=== Slovakia ===
The forces of Kampfgruppe Wildner were the first Galician units to arrive in Slovakia, on 29 September 1944, at Zemianske Kostoľany. It operated in the area around Zvolen and Žarnovica, in western Slovakia, together with other SS units. They recaptured several towns and villages from Slovak partisans during October. Kampfgruppe Wildner was then used to provide security in that area. As this was happening, the rest of the division arrived at Žilina, in northwest Slovakia. Taking over from Panzer Division Tatra, the Galician regiments and battalions were spread out in an area that was 47 miles from north to south and 65 miles from east to west. The Galicia Division maintained order in the towns there and carried out successful actions against Slovak partisans, according to the German military commander in Bratislava. Several other Axis units were also operating in northwest Slovakia, near the Galicia Division, including various SS units and the Hlinka Guard. On 27 October, the division's Kampfgruppe Wildner were the second Axis unit to enter Banská Bystrica, [following Kampfgruppe Schill] the center of the insurgency, and remained in the suburbs. None of its members were personally decorated by Slovak President Jozef Tiso. German commanders and members of Tiso's Slovak government acknowledged that the Ukrainians from the Galicia Division had a significant role in fighting the uprising in northwest Slovakia.

Ukrainian and German sources claim that the troops of the Galicia Division generally had good relations with the Slovak civilian population, and that Slovak guides mainly from the Hlinka Guard worked with the division, though there are accusations from Slovak sources that some of them carried out repraisals against civilians and destroyed entire villages during anti-partisan operations. Ukrainian civilian refugees also left Galicia for Slovakia around that time, where they were given refuge by the Tiso government, and some members of the division thought they might find their relatives in the country. It was also reported that about 200 Ukrainian soldiers defected from the Galicia Division to the Slovak partisans while they were stationed in Slovakia. Additionally, a November 1944 report on the UPA and the OUN by the German general Reinhard Gehlen, the head of military intelligence on the Eastern Front, claimed that Galicia Division members were in contact with the UPA and were giving their equipment to the Ukrainian nationalist underground.

In December 1944 and January 1945, a second battle ground formed around I./WGR 29 known as Kampfgruppe Dern fought against the Soviet 40th Army of the 2nd Ukrainian Front that launched an offensive into Slovakia from Hungary. In mid-January the frontline was approaching close to the division's headquarters in Žilina. On 21 January 1945 the division received an order to move from Slovakia to the Austria–Slovenia border region, in occupied Yugoslavia, to be subordinated to the Higher SS and Police Leader in Ljubljana. The Ukrainians had about 16,000 troops at the end of 1944 and the start of 1945, including the Training and Reserve Regiment. There were claims in Slovak sources that the Ukrainian troops were involved in looting supplies from the civilian population as they evacuated. Around that time the unit was renamed as the 14th Waffen Grenadier Division of the SS (1st Ukrainian), being called the Ukrainian Division for the first time by the German military command. Many of the division's members remained unaware of this change and continued using the name Galicia.

=== Yugoslavia ===
The division departed Slovakia for Maribor, Slovenia, in two separate groups on 31 January 1945, marching there because the railway lines were unavailable. The division had the opportunity to continue rebuilding and rearming itself while in Slovakia, as well as gaining experience in security operations, and the march to its new posting was successful. Divisional units were spread out in the Slovenian region of Styria and its adjacent Austrian region, Steiermark. They completed their arrival by 28 February. There the Galicia Division faced the Yugoslav Partisans, who were much better organized and more capable than the partisans in Slovakia.

The SS leader in Ljubljana was satisfied with the division's early successful operations against the local Yugoslav Partisan units, and decided to expand their role, sending some Ukrainian units to assist the Wehrmacht in the mountains south of Ljubljana. They carried out two large-scale operations against the partisans, neither of which were successful, as the partisans were able to evade and escape from the Galicia Division due to the mountainous terrain slowing down the division's movements and giving the partisans time to detect their approach. During its stay in this area the Galicia Division was reinforced with another Ukrainian battalion under German leadership, known as the Ukrainian Self-Defence Legion, along with Ukrainians from various other German units that sought to join the division as the Third Reich faced collapse. In April 1945 they also absorbed about 2,500 Luftwaffe ground personnel and pilots from the 10th Parachute Division.

=== Austria ===
In late March 1945, the Ukrainian Division was assigned to the I Cavalry Corps by Army Group South headquarters. As Hungarian resistance collapsed and the Soviet 3rd Ukrainian Front succeeded in breaking through to Austria, the division was ordered to relocate to the Bad Gleichenberg–Feldbach area, south of Vienna. The evacuation from the Yugoslav side of the border into Austria was completed on 1 April 1945. The division fought against Soviet troops, including the 3rd Guards Airborne Division, in southeast Austria alongside other German units, such as the IV SS Panzer Corps. From 15 to 17 April, the Galicia Division defeated a Soviet attack on Gleichenberg, which had placed the village's castle, held by Ukrainians, under siege. A relief force from the rest of the division reached the troops in the castle and pushed back the Soviets.

== 1st Division of the UNA ==
On 12 March 1945, Alfred Rosenberg issued a decree stating that the German government recognized the Ukrainian National Committee as the sole representative of the Ukrainians in Germany. Formed in late 1944, the organizers of the committee included Andriy Melnyk, Stepan Bandera, and Volodymyr Kubiyovych, the head of the Ukrainian Central Committee, which had been evacuated to Germany as the Red Army advanced. The National Committee appointed Pavlo Shandruk as the commander of its Ukrainian National Army. On 14 April 1945, the German government agreed to transfer control of the 14th Waffen-SS Division to the Ukrainian National Committee. Lieutenant General Pavlo Shandruk of the National Army arrived at the division headquarters to take command on 19 April. The current commander, Freitag, had received notice ahead of time from Fritz Arlt of the SS Eastern Volunteers Office informing him of the agreement with the Ukrainian National Committee. Together with Shandruk, Freitag presided over the change in name and emblems, and administered to the troops an oath of loyalty to Ukraine and the Ukrainian people. These events took place just weeks before the German surrender. Shandruk continued to work with Freitag and the German officers as the division commander.

There is a dispute over whether the change in its status as a Ukrainian National Army unit was formally acknowledged amidst the deteriorating war situation in Germany. Hitler was either unaware the division existed or had forgotten about it, and when he found out during a meeting of generals in mid-March 1945, he gave an order, which was never implemented, for the Ukrainians to be disarmed and their weapons to be given to a German division. But because of the situation at the front line and the rapid advance of the Western Allies and the Soviets, the 1st Ukrainian Division remained in effect part of the German military right up to the end of the war. On 6 May 1945 the German commanders in southeast Austria made the decision for all units to withdraw from the front line to surrender to the Americans or the British in the west instead of the Red Army. The Ukrainians surrendered to British troops at Tamsweg, central Austria, by 10 May 1945.

=== Rimini ===
Most of the Ukrainian soldiers were interned in Rimini, Italy, in the area controlled by the II Polish Corps. The UNA commander Pavlo Shandruk requested a meeting with Polish general Władysław Anders a prewar Polish Army colleague, asking him to protect the army against the deportation to Soviet Union. There is credible evidence that despite Soviet pressure, Anders managed to protect the Ukrainian troops, as former citizens of the Second Republic of Poland. This, together with the intervention of the Vatican, prevented its members from being deported to the USSR. Bishop Buchko of the Ukrainian Greek Catholic Church had appealed to Pope Pius XII to intervene on behalf of the division, whom he described as "good Catholics and fervent anti-Communists". Due to Vatican intervention, the British authorities changed the status of the division members from POW to surrendered enemy personnel. 176 soldiers of the division, mainly prewar Polish Army officers followed their commander in joining Anders's Polish army.

=== Emigration to Canada and Britain ===
Former soldiers of SS "Galizien" were allowed to emigrate to Canada and the United Kingdom in 1947. The names of about 8,000 men from the division who were admitted to the UK have been stored in the so-called "Rimini List". Despite several requests of various lobby groups, the details of the list have never been officially released; it is available online for public inspection at the Schevchenko Archive in Linden Gardens, London. In 2003 the anti-terrorist branch of Scotland Yard launched an investigation into people from the list by cross-referencing NHS patient, social security and pensions records. The order to release confidential medical records was decried by civil liberties groups. Thirty-two members of the 14th division were denied entry to settle in Britain because of their war records.

== Atrocities and war crimes ==
The 1 October 1946 Judgement at Nuremberg against "Major War Criminals" did not specifically mention this unit, but ruled that all persons who had been officially accepted as members of the SS after 1 September 1939 and who became or remained members of the organization with knowledge that it was being used for the commission of war crimes or who were personally implicated in them to be criminal within the meaning of Article 6 of the Charter, with the exception of those who were drafted into membership by the State and did not commit crimes. Members of the 14th Waffen Grenadier Division of the SS were volunteers and members of the SS. The 4th battalion of the 14th Waffen Grenadier Division was itself found guilty of war crimes by the Chief Commission for the Prosecution of Crimes against the Polish Nation, and the Institute of History at the Ukrainian Academy of Sciences. No individuals among the Ukrainian enlisted men of the 14th have been prosecuted individually for any war crimes.

According to Howard Margolian, only a small number of the enlisted men were recruited from established Ukrainian auxiliary police detachments. Among those who had transferred from these police detachments, some had been members of a coastal defense unit that had been stationed in France, while others came from two police battalions that had been formed in the spring of 1943, probably too late to have participated in the systematic murder of Ukraine's Jews. Among the German commanding officers of Waffen-SS Galizien were SS-Hauptsturmführer Heinrich Wiens, who had served with Einsatzgruppen D, which carried out the annihilation of Jews, Communists, and partisans in occupied eastern Ukraine, and SS-Obersturmbannführer Franz Magill. Magill was tried and convicted for war crimes (committed in Belarus with another SS unit prior to this unit's formation) twice: at the end of the war and in 1964.

Elements of the Waffen-SS Galizien worked alongside one of the most brutal units of Nazi Germany, the SS-Sonderbattalion Dirlewanger, which had carried out brutal anti-partisan activities in Belarus and Poland, and had taken part in the suppression of the Warsaw Uprising. The Waffen-SS Galizien destroyed several Polish communities in western Ukraine during the winter and spring of 1944. Specifically, the 4th and 5th SS Police Regiments have been accused of murdering Polish civilians in the course of anti-guerilla activity. At the time of their actions, those units were not yet under Divisional command, but were under German police command. Yale historian Timothy Snyder noted that the division's role in the Massacres of Poles in Volhynia and Eastern Galicia was limited, because the murders were primarily carried out by the Ukrainian Insurgent Army. In a speech to the soldiers of the 1st Galician division, Heinrich Himmler stated:

Your homeland has become so much more beautiful since you have lost – on our initiative, I must say – those residents who were so often a dirty blemish on Galicia's good name, namely the Jews ... I know that if I ordered you to liquidate the Poles ... I would be giving you permission to do what you are eager to do anyway.

In June 2013, Associated Press published an article stating that an American, Michael Karkoc, who was alleged to be a former "deputy company commander" in the division, was implicated in war crimes committed before he joined the division in 1945. According to Associated Press, before joining the Division Karkoc had served as a "lieutenant" of the 2nd Company of the German SS Police-led Ukrainian Self Defense Legion (USDL). The USDL was a paramilitary police organization in the Schutzmannschaft. Karkoc was found living in Lauderdale, Minnesota. He had arrived in the United States in 1949 and became a naturalized citizen in 1959.

=== Huta Pieniacka ===
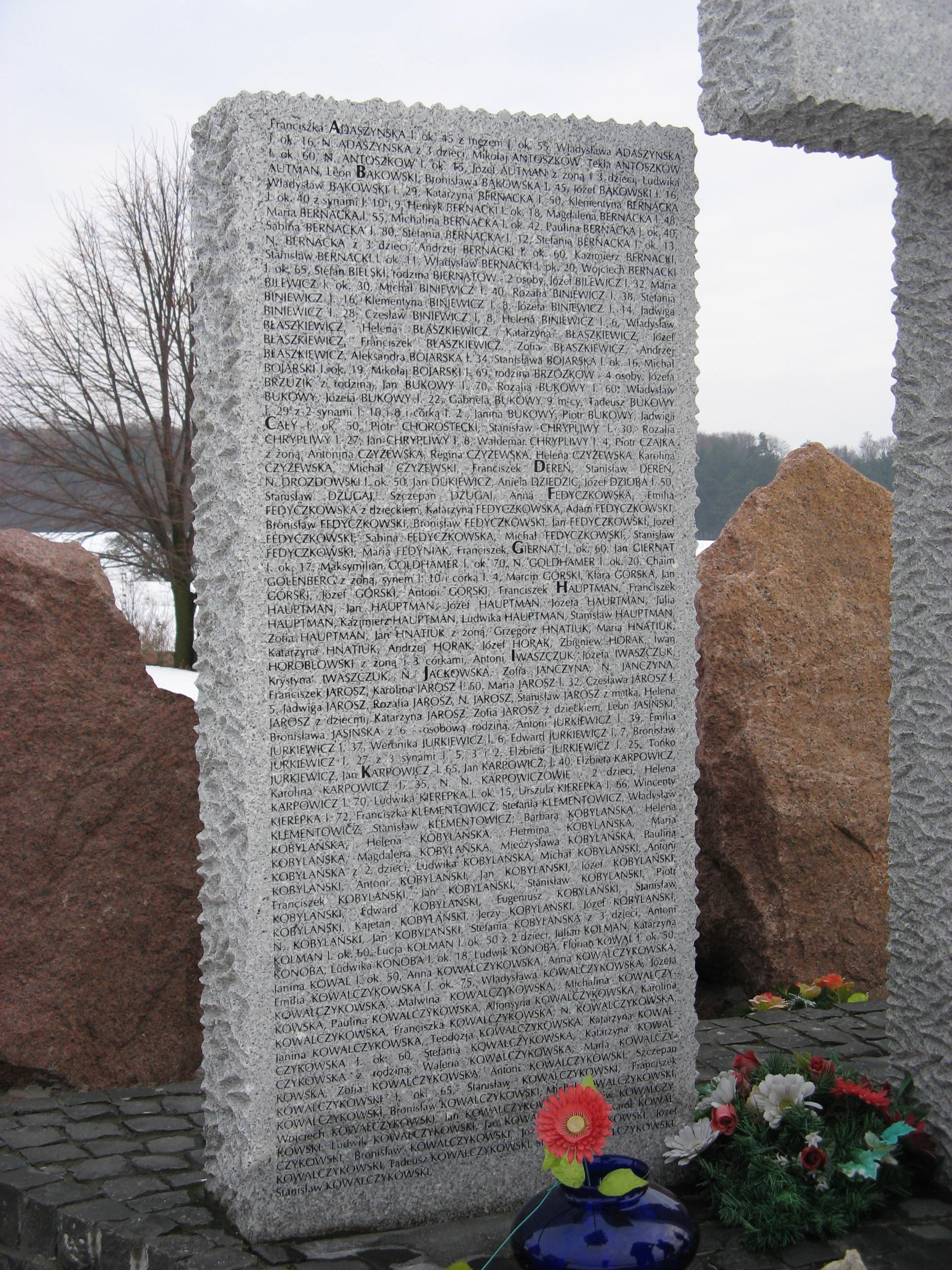
One of the stone tablets of the monument which lists the names of Poles killed at Huta Pieniacka.

In the winter and spring of 1944, the SS-Galizien participated in the destruction of several Polish villages, including the village of Huta Pieniacka. About five hundred civilians were murdered. The Polish historian Grzegorz Motyka has stated that the Germans formed several SS police regiments (numbered from 4 to 8) which included "Galizien" in their name. Those police regiments joined the division in Spring 1944. On 23 February 1944, before being incorporated into the division, the 4th and 5th police regiments had participated in anti-guerrilla action at Huta Pieniacka, against Soviet and Polish Armia Krajowa partisans in the village of Huta Pieniacka, which had also served as a shelter for Jews and as a fortified centre for Polish and Soviet guerrillas. Huta Pieniacka was a Polish self-defence outpost, organized by inhabitants of the village and sheltering civilian refugees from Volhynia. On 23 February 1944, two members of a detachment of the division were shot by the self-defense forces. Five days later, a mixed force of Ukrainian police and German soldiers shelled the village before entering it and ordering all the civilians to gather together. In the ensuing massacre, the village of Huta Pienacka was destroyed, and between 500 and 1,000 of the inhabitants were killed. According to Polish accounts, civilians were locked in barns that were set on fire, while those attempting to flee were killed.

Polish witness accounts state that the soldiers were accompanied by Ukrainian nationalists (paramilitary unit under Włodzimierz Czerniawski's command), which included members of the UPA, as well as inhabitants of nearby villages who took property from households. The NASU Institute of History of Ukraine of the National Academy of Sciences of Ukraine concluded that the 4th and 5th SS Galizien Police regiments did kill the civilians within the village, but added that the grisly reports by eyewitnesses in the Polish accounts were "far-fetched" and that the likelihood was "difficult to believe". The institute also noted that, at the time of the massacre, the police regiments were not under 14th division command, but rather under German police command (specifically, under German SD and SS command of the General Government). The Polish Institute of National Remembrance stated: "According to the witness' testimonies, and in the light of the collected documentation, there is no doubt that the 4th battalion 'Galizien' of the 14th division of SS committed the crime".

=== Pidkamin and Palikrowy ===
The village of Pidkamin was the site of a monastery where Poles sought shelter from the encroaching front. On 11 March 1944, around 2,000 people, the majority of whom were women and children, were seeking refuge there when the monastery was attacked by the Ukrainian Insurgent Army (unit under the command of Maksym Skorupsky), allegedly cooperating with an SS-Galizien unit. The next day, 12 March, the monastery was captured and civilians were murdered (part of the population managed to escape at night). From 12 to 16 March, other civilians were also killed in the town of Pidkamin.

Estimates of victims range from 150, by Polish historian Grzegorz Motyka, to 250, according to the researchers of the Institute of History of the Ukrainian Academy of Sciences. Members of another SS-Galizien sub-unit also participated in the execution of Polish civilians in Palykorovy, located in the Lwów area (Lviv oblast) near Pidkamin (former Tarnopol Voivodeship). It is estimated that 365 ethnic Poles were murdered, including women and children.

=== Other atrocities ===
In his study of the Holocaust, Dieter Pohl had come to the conclusion there is a "high probability" that in February 1944 at Brody men from the 14th SS assisted in rounding-up Jewish people. On 4 March 1944, 14th SS men and German gendarmé conducted pacfication operations at the village Wicyń (Vitsyn) in Poland. On the same day, 600 villagers were murdered in the villages of Czernicy, Palikrowy, and Malinska. In April 1944, the 14th SS burned the Polish villages of Budki Nieznanowskie in Kamionka Strumiłowa, Iasenytsia Polsk in Kamionka Strumiłowa, and Pawłów in Radziechowsk. 22 villagers were murdered in Chatki, in the district of Pohajce by "deserters" from the 14th SS.

== Organization ==
The name of the division was changed several times during its short history. The name Waffen-Grenadier der SS was used for SS infantry divisions that primarily consisted of non-Germanic people, as a way of getting around the organization's racial policies, because these units were subordinated to the SS but not fully part of it.

- SS-Volunteer Division "Galicia" (German: SS-Freiwilligen-Division "Galizien") – from 28 April to 22 October 1943
- 14th Galician SS-Volunteer Division (German: 14. Galizische SS-Freiwilligen-Division) – from 22 October 1943 to 27 June 1944
- 14th Waffen Grenadier Division of the SS (1st Galician) (German: 14. Waffen-Grenadier-Division der SS (galizische Nr.1)) – from 27 June to November 1944
- 14th Waffen Grenadier Division of the SS (1st Ukrainian) (German: 14. Waffen-Grenadier-Division der SS (ukrainische Nr.1)) – from November 1944 to 19 April 1945
- 1st Division of the Ukrainian National Army – from 19 April to 8 May 1945.

=== Structure ===
The division consisted of the following units:

- 29th Waffen-Grenadier Regiment
- 30th Waffen-Grenadier Regiment
- 31st Waffen-Grenadier Regiment
- 14th Waffen-Artillery Regiment
- 14th Waffen-Fusilier Battalion
- 14th Tank Destroyer Battalion
- 14th Engineer Battalion
- 14th Signal Battalion
- 14th Anti-Aircraft Battalion
- 14th Field Replacement Battalion
- 14th Divisional Supply Troops

== Commanders ==
The following officers were the commanders of the division. Fritz Freitag was the longest serving commander of the Galicia Division, and he continued in that role until the German surrender at the end of the war, at which point he committed suicide. Freitag, the newly appointed commander Pavlo Shandruk, who had taken command in the last days of the war, and Otto Wächter arranged the surrender to the Western Allies. The Ukrainian general Mykhailo Krat was briefly in command of the troops after the surrender, when they were held at a prison camp.

- SS-Brigadeführer and Major General of Waffen-SS Walter Schimana (30 June 1943 – 20 November 1943)
- SS-Brigadeführer and Major General of Waffen-SS Fritz Freitag (20 November 1943 – January 1944)
- SS-Standartenführer and Colonel of Waffen-SS Friedrich Beyersdorff (January – February 1944)
- SS-Brigadeführer and Major General of Waffen-SS Fritz Freitag (February 1944 – 19 April 1945)
- Lieutenant General Pavlo Shandruk (19 April – 8 May 1945)

== Legacy ==
=== In Ukraine ===
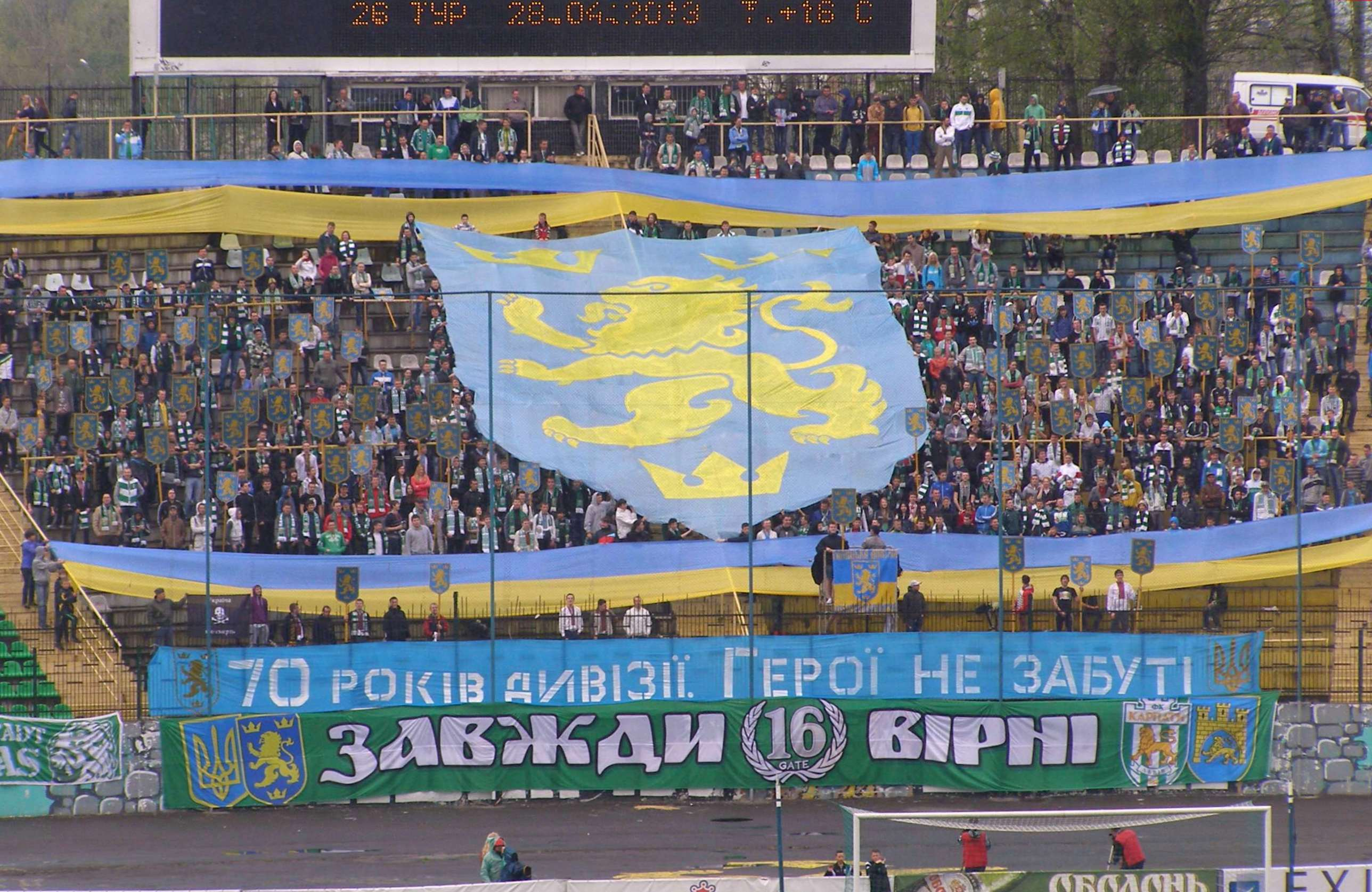
Fans of the FC Karpaty Lviv football club honoring the Waffen-SS Galizien division, Lviv, Ukraine, 2013

The 14th Waffen Grenadier Division of the SS (1st Galician) is today honored by many Ukrainian nationalists. On 28 April, an annual march is organised locally in Lviv to celebrate the anniversary of the division's foundation. On 30 April 2021, after the march was held in Kyiv, Ukrainian President Volodymyr Zelenskyy, who is Jewish, condemned the march, stating: "We categorically condemn any manifestation of propaganda of totalitarian regimes, in particular the National Socialist, and attempts to revise truth about World War II." Zelenskyy emphasised that "the defeat of Nazism was a victory for our people", and called for law enforcement and the Kyiv city administration to investigate the march. The march was also condemned by the German and Israeli governments.

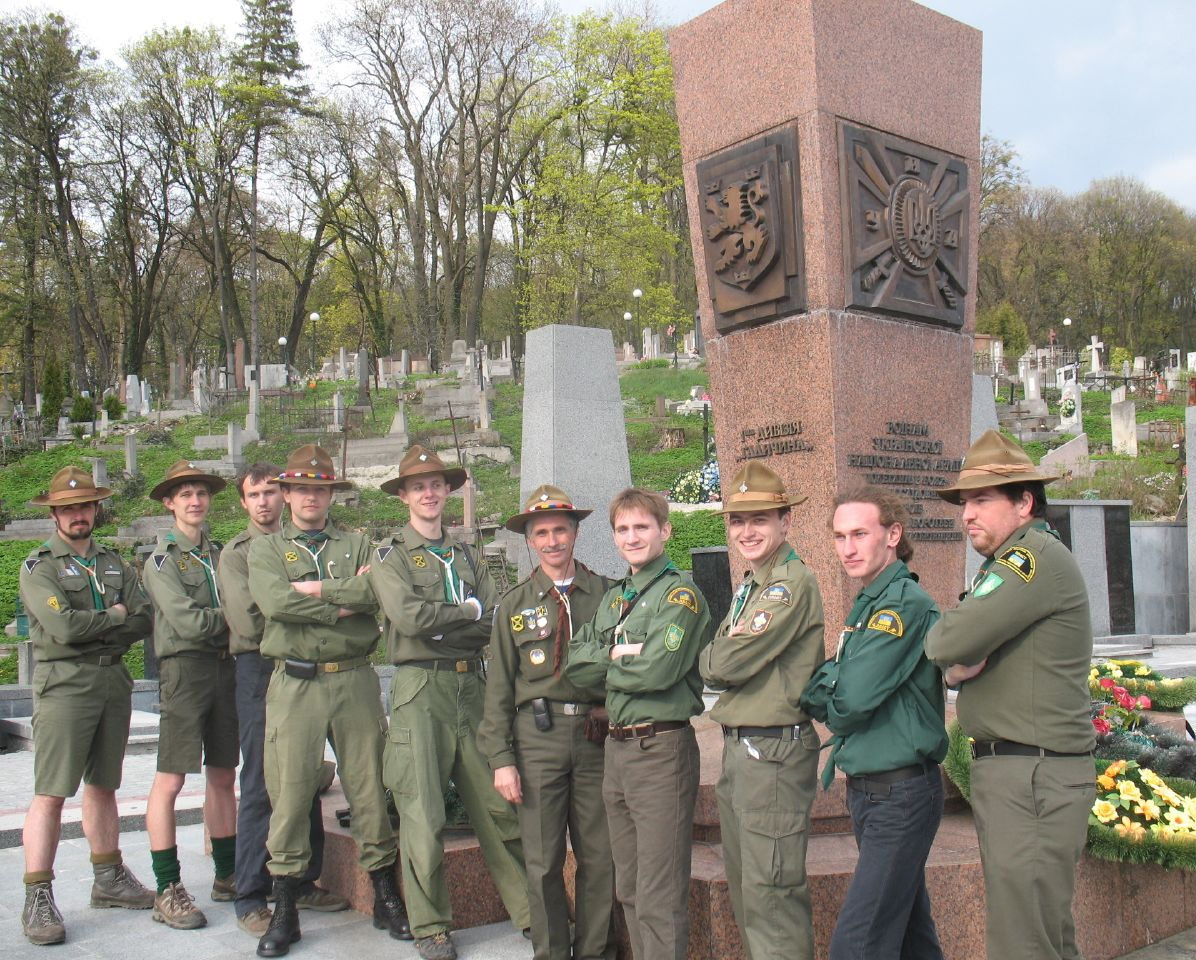
Members of the Ukrainian Plast at a monument to fallen SS soldiers

Streets were named after the division in Ivano-Frankivsk (Ukrains`koi Dyvizii Street) and Ternopil (Soldiers Division "Galicia" Street), and in Lviv there are memorial plaques in honour of the soldiers who fought in the division. On 23 September 2020, the Ukrainian Supreme Court ruled that symbols of SS Division Galicia do not belong to the Nazis and therefore were not banned in the country. The same argument was made by the Ukrainian Institute of National Memory, led at the time by Volodymyr Viatrovych. On 13 June 2021, the funeral of SS "Galicia" member Orest Vaskul was attended by the presidential regiment.

=== In Poland ===
In 2016, the Polish parliament classified the crimes of the division's soldiers against the Polish population as genocide.

=== In Canada ===
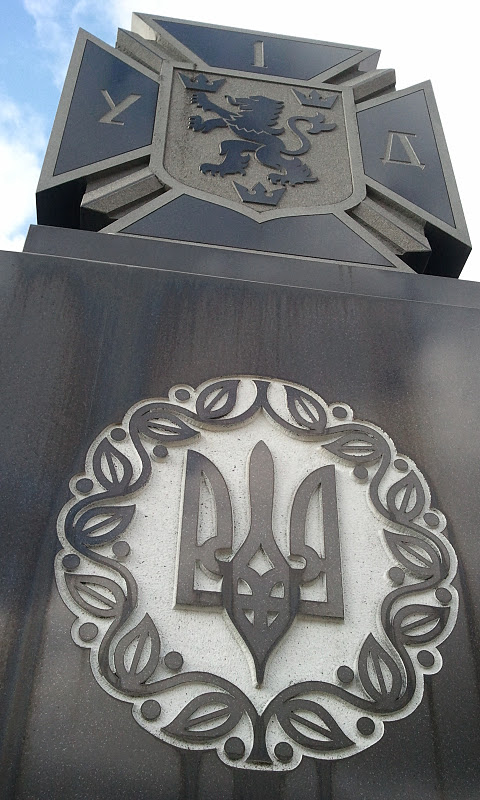
Former Cenotaph at the St. Volodymyr Ukrainian Cemetery

The granite cenotaph bearing the unit's insignia and an inscription dedicating it "To Those Who Died For the Freedom of Ukraine" existed in St. Volodymyr Ukrainian Cemetery, Oakville, Ontario. On 22 June 2020, the monument was vandalized when someone painted "Nazi war monument" on it. On 17 July, the Halton Regional Police announced that this was being investigated as a hate crime before walking back on it soon after. The monument was removed on 9 March 2024. There is also a monument to the division in St. Michael's Cemetery, Edmonton. In 2021 it was vandalized with "nazi monument" painted on one side and "14th Waffen SS" on the other.

On 22 September 2023, Yaroslav Hunka, a veteran of the division, was invited to the Parliament of Canada along with Ukrainian President Volodymyr Zelenskyy, where they both received standing ovations from Canadian Prime Minister Justin Trudeau and most MPs. Following international criticism, including from the Simon Wiesenthal Center, the Speaker of the House of Commons Anthony Rota apologized on the 24th for inviting the veteran stating "I have subsequently become aware of more information which causes me to regret my decision [to honour Hunka]. I wish to make clear that no one, including fellow parliamentarians and the Ukraine delegation, was aware of my intention or of my remarks before I delivered them". He resigned as Speaker on the 26th while remaining an MP. The Ukrainian National Federation of Canada defended Hunka and stated that there was nothing wrong with Canadian Parliament applauding a man "who fought for his country".

Ukrainian-Canadian political science professor Ivan Katchanovski stated that the supporters of the SS Galicia Division in Canada, where many of their members immigrated after the Second World War, attempted to portray it as a patriotic military formation, despite its collaboration with the Third Reich and its responsibility in the mass killings of Jews, Ukrainians and Poles: "They represent this division as fighting not for Nazi Germany, but for Ukrainian independence. They fought under German command until the end of the Second World War". This process was opposed by Canadian Jewish groups.

In 1987, former 14th Waffen SS veteran Peter Savaryn was awarded the Order of Canada. He served as Chancellor of the University of Alberta and was president of the Progressive Conservative Association of Alberta and Ukrainian World Congress. After the Hunka scandal, Governor General Mary Simon apologized the awarding of Savaryn.

==== Deschênes Commission ====
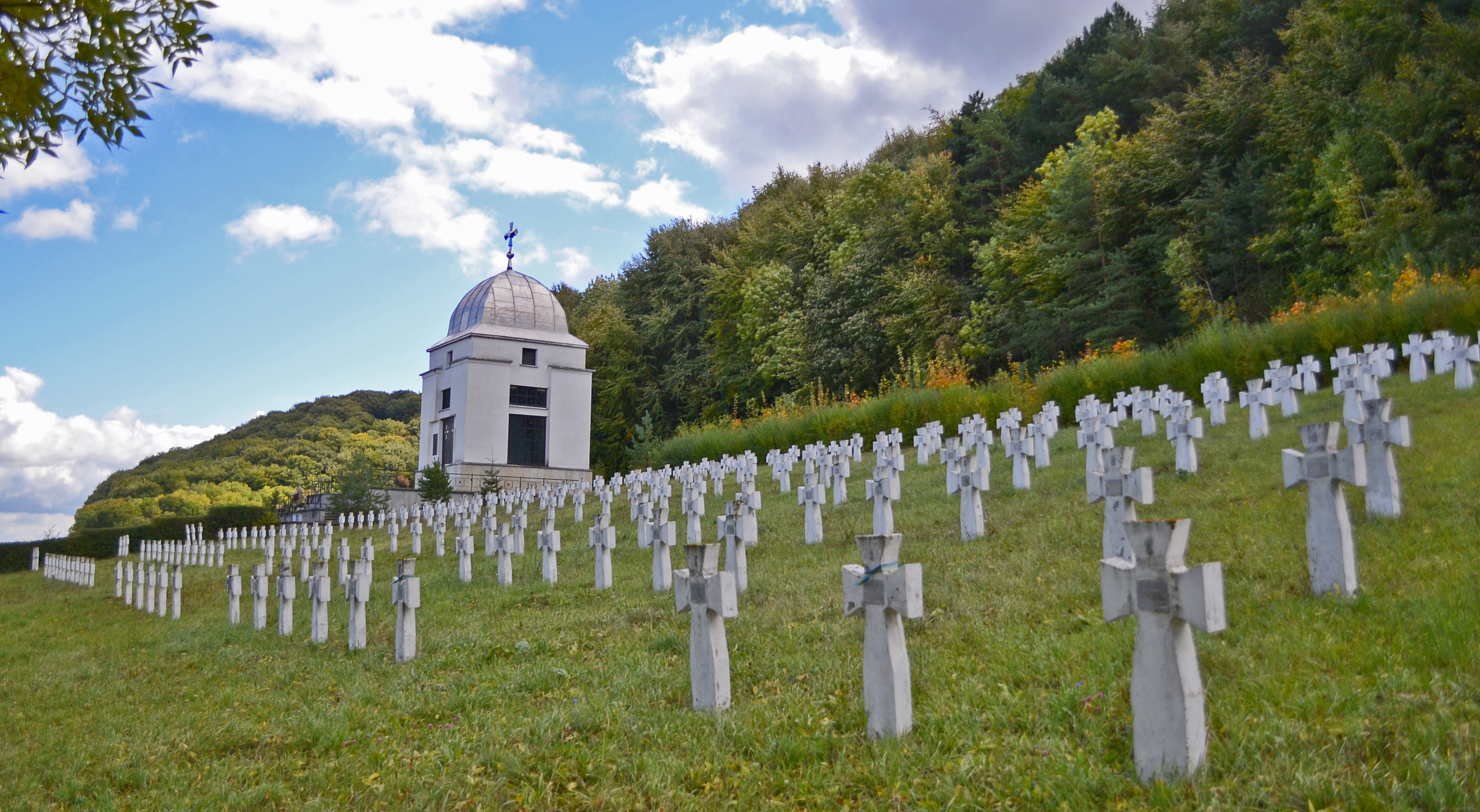
Military cemetery of the SS-Galizien division in Chervone, Lviv Oblast, western Ukraine

The Canadian Deschênes Commission of October 1986, headed by retired judge Jules Deschênes, concluded that in relation to membership in the Galicia Division:

56- The Galicia Division (14.Waffengrenadierdivision der SS [gal. Nr. 1) should not be indicted as a group.

57- The members of the Galicia Division were individually screened for security purposes before admission to Canada.

58- Charges of war crimes against members of the Galicia Division have never been substantiated, either in 1950 when they were first preferred, or in 1984 when they were renewed, or before this Commission.

59- Further, in the absence of evidence of participation in or knowledge of specific war crimes, mere membership in the Galicia Division is insufficient to justify prosecution.

The Commission considered the International Military Tribunal's verdict at the Nuremberg Trials, at which the entire Waffen-SS organisation was declared a "criminal organization" guilty of war crimes.

Critics of the commission have pointed out failings on the part of the commission. In a 1989 article for the Ottawa Citizen, community activist and journalist Sol Littman said that "the All-Party Parliamentary War Crimes Group of the British House of Commons found that screening was virtually 'non-existent' for Ukrainian SS veterans who entered Canada in 1950." He added that entry into Canada was based on "false assurances" from the U.K. that they were not war criminals. It was discovered that in 1947 the Foreign Office lied to parliament, that the SS men had undergone "an exhaustive screening process". In a 1997 interview with 60 Minutes, Irving Abella stated that getting into Canada for SS members was as easy as just showing their SS blood type tattoo which indicated that they were reliably anti-communist.

The commission completed its work without consideration of Soviet evidence. The commission would not travel to Europe. No evidence or witness testimony from organizations and victims where the alleged crimes took place in Eastern Europe was taken or used in the investigation. Rabbi Marvin Hier, of the Simon Wiesenthal Centre said the commission, "did not go far enough" and added "not to pursue investigations against individuals merely for being members of the Galicia Division did not necessarily mean the individual veterans were all innocent."

=== In the United States ===
A cross dedicated to the division is placed in Saint Mary's Ukrainian Catholic Cemetery, in Elkins Park, a suburb of Philadelphia. The American Jewish Committee declared that the monument should be removed. Another monument is placed in Warren, a suburb of Detroit, on the side of a Ukrainian credit union building. The mayor of the city, James R. Fouts, once informed of the monument, stated that: "There's not even a minute chance that we would support anything like this."

== See also ==
- List of Waffen-SS units
- Waffen-SS foreign volunteers and conscripts
- Ukrainian collaboration with Nazi Germany

== Bibliography ==
- Abbott, Peter (2004). Ukrainian Armies 1914–55. Osprey Publishing. ISBN 1-84176-668-2.
- Armstrong, John (1963). Ukrainian Nationalism. New York: Columbia University Press.
- Bolianovskyi, Andrii; Młynarczyk, Jacek Andrzej; Rein, Leonid; Romanko, Oleg (2017). "Eastern Europe: Belarusian auxiliaries, Ukrainian Waffen-SS soldiers, and the special case of the Polish 'Blue Police'". In Jochen Böhler; Robert Gerwarth (eds.). The Waffen-SS: A European History. Oxford: Oxford University Press. ISBN 978-0-19-879055-6.
- Cesarani, David (1992). Justice Delayed: How Britain Became a Refuge for Nazi War Criminals. William Heinemann Ltd. ISBN 978-0-434-11304-0.
- Heike, Wolf-Dietrich (1988) [1970 (in Ukrainian)]. The Ukrainian Division 'Galicia', 1943–45: A Memoir. Shevchenko Scientific Society. ISBN 9780969023944. OCLC 0969023944.
- Logusz, Michael O. (1997). Galicia Division: The Waffen-SS 14th Grenadier Division 1943–1945. Schiffer Publishing. ISBN 0-7643-0081-4.
- Luciuk, Lubomyr Y. (2023). The Galicia Division: They Fought for Ukraine. Kashtan Press. ISBN 978-1896-3540-57. Available at: https://www.ukrainianworldcongress.org/the-galicia-division-they-fought-for-ukraine-has-been-released-internationally/
- Margolian, Howard (2000). Unauthorized Entry: The Truth about Nazi War Criminals in Canada, 1946–1956. Toronto: University of Toronto Press. ISBN 0-8020-4277-5.
- Melnyk, Michael James (2002). To Battle: The Formation and History of the 14th Galician Waffen-SS Division. Helion & Company. ISBN 978-1-874622-19-2.
- Mitcham, Samuel W. (2007a). German Order of Battle: Panzer, Panzer Grenadier, and Waffen SS divisions in World War II. Mechanicsburg, Pennsylvania: Stackpole Books. ISBN 978-0-8117-3438-7.
- Mitcham, Samuel W. (2007b). The German Defeat in the East, 1944–45. Mechanicsburg, Pennsylvania: Stackpole Books. ISBN 978-0-8117-3371-7.
- Motyka, Grzegorz (2006). Ukraińska Partyzantka 1942–1960 [Ukrainian Partisan 1942–1960] (in Polish). Warsaw.
- Piotrowski, Tadeusz (1998a). "Akcja "Wisła" – Operation "Vistula," 1947: Background and Assessment". The Polish Review. 43 (2): 219–238. ISSN 0032-2970. JSTOR 25779049.
- Piotrowski, Tadeusz (1998b). Poland's Holocaust: Ethnic Strife, Collaboration with Occupying Forces and Genocide in the Second Republic, 1918–1947. McFarland & Company. ISBN 978-0-7864-0371-4.
- Rudling, Per Anders (2012). "'They Defended Ukraine': The 14. Waffen-Grenadier-Division der SS (Galizische Nr. 1) Revisited". The Journal of Slavic Military Studies. 25 (3): 329–368. doi:10.1080/13518046.2012.705633. ISSN 1556-3006. S2CID 144432759.
- Rudling, Per Anders (2020). "Long-Distance Nationalism: Ukrainian Monuments and Historical Memory in Multicultural Canada". In Marschall, Sabine (ed.). Public Memory in the Context of Transnational Migration and Displacement. Springer. ISBN 978-3-030-41329-3.
- Scherzer, Veit (2007). Die Ritterkreuzträger 1939–1945 [The Knight's Cross Bearers 1939–1945] (in German). Jena, Germany: Scherzers Militaer-Verlag. ISBN 978-3-938845-17-2.
- Shkandrij, Myroslav (2023). In the Maelstrom: The Waffen-SS "Galicia" Division and Its Legacy. McGuil-Queen's University Press. ISBN 978-0-2280-1654-0.
- Šmigeľ, Michal; Cherkasov, Aleksandr A. (2013). "The 14th Waffen-Grenadier-Division of the SS «Galizien No. 1» in Slovakia (1944–1945): Battles and Repressions". Bylye Gody. 28 (2): 61–72.
- Snyder, Timothy (2003). The Reconstruction of Nations: Poland, Ukraine, Lithuania, Belarus, 1569-1999. Yale University Press. ISBN 978-0-300-10586-5.
- Subtelny, Orest (1988). Ukraine: A History. Toronto: University of Toronto Press.
- Tucker-Jones, Anthony (2022). Hitler's Armed SS: The Waffen-SS at War, 1939–1945. Pen and Sword. ISBN 978-1-3990-0694-1.
- Yurkevich, Myroslav (1986). "Galician Ukrainians in German Military Formations and in the German Administration". In Yury Boshyk (ed.). Ukraine During World War II: History and Its Aftermath. Canadian Institute of Ukrainian Studies, University of Alberta. ISBN 978-0-920862-36-0.
