= Yaroslav Hunka scandal =

2023 Canadian political scandal

On 22 September 2023, Yaroslav Hunka, a Ukrainian Canadian who fought in the SS Division Galicia of the military wing of the Nazi Party, the Waffen-SS, was invited to the House of Commons of Canada to be recognized by Speaker Anthony Rota, the Member of Parliament for Hunka's district. Hunka received two standing ovations from all house members, including Canadian prime minister Justin Trudeau, other party leaders, and visiting Ukrainian president Volodymyr Zelenskyy.

Hunka's membership in the Waffen-SS was reported initially by The Forward, which quoted a tweet by academic Ivan Katchanovski. The story was picked up by the Canadian media, receiving international attention.

The incident, seen as a political blunder and a scandal, such that it drew comparisons to the most embarrassing moments in Canada's history, was leveraged by the Russian establishment to further its justifications for waging war in Ukraine, which had been started under a pretext of "denazification", among other stated reasons. Rota resigned as speaker five days later, and the House unanimously adopted a motion to condemn Nazism and withdraw its recognition of Hunka. Prime Minister Trudeau and Canadian government officials apologized to the worldwide Jewish community. The handling of suspected World War II war criminals in Canada became a renewed matter of public interest.

== Background ==
=== Yaroslav Hunka ===
Yaroslav Ilkovych Hunka (Ukrainian: Ярослав Ількович Гунька; Polish: Jarosław Hunka; born 19 March 1925) is a Ukrainian-Canadian World War II veteran of the 14th Waffen Grenadier Division of the SS (1st Galician)—abbreviated (Note: from the German name 14. SS-Freiwilligen Division "Galizien" (14th SS-Volunteer Division "Galicia"), which was the unit's name prior to 1944) as SS Galizien—a military formation of Nazi Germany. (Note: It was renamed the First Ukrainian Division before its surrender in 1945.) Hunka was born in Urman, Second Polish Republic (now Ukraine). In 1943, Hunka volunteered to join SS Galizien at 18 years old. According to Hunka, his reason for enlisting was following the call of the Ukrainian Central Committee to fight for the idea of "Unified Ukraine". During his time in the unit, he was photographed training in Munich and Neuhammer (present day Świętoszów). He received the rank of Rottenführer.

In 1944, Hunka was deployed into combat against Red Army forces on the Eastern Front of World War II. Dominique Arel, the chair of Ukrainian studies at the University of Ottawa, told CBC News that thousands of Ukrainian volunteers had been drawn to the division, and that many aspired doing so could help attain Ukrainian independence from the Soviet Union. According to Arel, it was "difficult to determine" whether specific groups of the division took part in atrocities, but he said that by the time Hunka's unit reached the front, German operations relating to the Holocaust would have ended in that area. He said, however, that the SS Galizien had been implicated in the killing of Polish civilians. In his memoir, Hunka referred to the Wehrmacht as "mystical German knights who give 'bullets' to the hated cowards", referring to fleeing Polish soldiers and civilians.

Following the conclusion of World War II in Europe, Hunka, now a displaced person, was held in the Rimini Surrendered Enemy Personnel camp. He subsequently settled in the United Kingdom and joined the Association of Ukrainians in Great Britain. In 1951, he married Margaret Ann Edgerton (1931–2018) from Studley, Warwickshire, and the couple emigrated to Canada three years later, settling in Toronto, where they raised their two sons, Martin and Peter, and became active in the Ukrainian-Canadian community. After graduating from a technical college, Hunka worked in the aircraft industry, eventually becoming an inspector for De Havilland. In retirement, Hunka was heavily involved in the Ukrainian community; his sons established the Yaroslav and Margaret Hunka Ukrainian Research Endowment Fund at the University of Alberta to advance academic research in the underground Ukrainian Catholic Church. On 20 August 2004, Hunka was named an Honorary Citizen of the City of Berezhany in Ukraine by the Berezhany city council. In 2007, the Ukrainian Canadian Congress awarded Hunka and other former members of the SS Galizien the Medal of Merit.

Between 2010 and 2011, Hunka contributed to The Combatant News, a blog by an association of SS Galizien veterans, where he described his service in the SS as "the happiest two years of my life". In 2022, Hunka travelled to Greater Sudbury to protest against the Russian invasion of Ukraine that year. Describing the situation in Ukraine, Hunka told CTV News that the "Destruction is just unbelievable but it will take years and years to rebuild it, ... But Ukrainian [sic] will win and God Bless Ukraine and I pray for it." As of 2023, he was a resident of North Bay, Ontario. On 6 February 2024, the parliament of Ternopil province in Ukraine awarded Hunka with a Badge "for Merits to Ternopil Region" for his significant personal contribution to providing assistance to the Armed Forces of Ukraine, active charitable and public activities, and on the occasion of the 112th anniversary of the birth of Yaroslav Stetsko.

=== Handling of suspected World War II war criminals in Canada ===
In the years after World War II, Canada's permissive immigration policies enabled many alleged Nazi war criminals to settle in the country. An especially large number of former SS Galizien members (relative to their total number) migrated to Canada from the United Kingdom, where they had been detained. While there existed a policy of denying entry to former Nazi military personnel, members of this unit were exempted by a 1950 cabinet-level decision.

In 1985, the government of Canada formed the Deschênes Commission to investigate claims that Canada had become a haven for Nazi war criminals. The commission's final report was issued at the end of 1986 in two parts. It alleged that Nazi war criminals had immigrated to Canada and in some cases were still residing in the country, and recommended changes to criminal and citizenship law to allow Canada to prosecute war criminals. The second part of the final report, which concerns allegations against specific individuals, and contains an appendix listing 240 individuals suspected of war crimes, has never been made public. SS Galizien was a significant topic of the investigation; according to the report, "Charges of war crimes against members of the Galicia Division have never been substantiated."

Canada subsequently enacted war crimes legislation by amending the Criminal Code to enable Canadian courts to adjudicate cases of war crimes and crimes against humanity committed outside Canada. The only individual to be prosecuted under this legislation for his actions in relation to Nazi war crimes was Imre Finta, who was acquitted in 1990. In 1994, after several similar cases in which charges had been dropped, Canada said it would no longer prosecute Nazi war criminals.

=== Canadian response to the Russo-Ukrainian War ===
After the February 2022 Russian invasion of Ukraine, Canada sanctioned Russia and sent weapons to Ukraine. An important element of Russia's pretext for the invasion was Ukraine's "denazification". On 8 May 2022, Canada's prime minister Justin Trudeau made a surprise visit to Kyiv to meet with Ukrainian president Volodymyr Zelenskyy. Zelenskyy is Jewish and previously condemned a march in Kyiv in honour of the SS Galizien in 2021; he emphasised then that "the defeat of Nazism was a victory for our people", and called for law enforcement and the Kyiv city administration to investigate. Zelenskyy made a surprise visit to Canada on 22 September 2023 (his first since the invasion) and spoke to the House of Commons.

== Volodymyr Zelenskyy's House of Commons of Canada visit ==
After Zelenskyy's visit became publicly known, the constituency office of Anthony Rota, the speaker of the House of Commons, was contacted by Yaroslav Hunka's son Martin Hunka, a resident of Rota's district of Nipissing—Timiskaming, with a request for his father to be present in the Parliament during the address. Rota accepted the request. According to a later statement by the government house leader, Karina Gould, he did so without informing the government or the Ukrainian delegation.

On 22 September 2023, Rota recognized Hunka's presence in the chamber, saying: "We have here in the chamber today a Ukrainian Canadian war veteran from the Second World War who fought for Ukrainian independence against the Russians and continues to support the troops today even at his age of 98." Rota further praised Hunka, asserting: "He is a Ukrainian hero, a Canadian hero, and we thank him for all his service." After Rota's praise, the chamber gave two standing ovations to Hunka, which Zelenskyy and his wife also joined.

Prime Minister Justin Trudeau also invited Hunka to attend a rally in Toronto for Zelenskyy's visit. The Ukrainian Canadian Congress had nominated Hunka to attend, but he did not go to the event.

== Aftermath ==
=== Reactions ===
Reactions to the celebration of Hunka were negative and generated international headlines. The Friends of Simon Wiesenthal Center for Holocaust Studies said that Hunka's unit's "crimes against humanity during the Holocaust are well-documented", and condemned SS Galizien as "responsible for the mass murder of innocent civilians with a level of brutality and malice that is unimaginable", referencing events such as the 1944 Huta Pieniacka massacre of Polish civilians.

In a statement released on 24 September, Rota accepted responsibility for inviting Hunka to the ceremony, stating that he "particularly want[ed] to extend [his] deepest apologies to Jewish communities in Canada and around the world" and accepting "full responsibility" for the incident. Ann-Clara Vaillancourt, a spokeswoman for Trudeau, called Rota's apology "the right thing to do" and emphasized Rota's responsibility for inviting Hunka to the ceremony.

Prime Minister Trudeau said, "This is a mistake that deeply embarrassed parliament and Canada" and apologized to President Zelenskyy. Leader of the Opposition Pierre Poilievre called it the "biggest single diplomatic embarrassment" in Canadian history.

The event renewed interest in the topic of the handling of suspected war criminals who immigrated to Canada, and led to calls to declassify the second part of the Deschênes Commission's report. Canadian politician and human rights advocate Irwin Cotler, who was chief counsel to the Canadian Jewish Congress at the Deschênes Commission, said on behalf of the Raoul Wallenberg Centre for Human Rights: "While the apologies are necessary and welcome, it raises a larger question. How did Yaroslav Hunka, a notorious Nazi war criminal, enter Canada to begin with? How is it that he was never held accountable?"

On 27 September, University of Alberta interim provost and vice president Verna Yiu announced the school would close the Hunka Ukrainian Research Endowment Fund and return its approximately CA$30,000 to Hunka's sons, saying that the university "recognizes and regrets the unintended harm caused."

The president of the Ukrainian National Federation of Canada defended Hunka and stated that there was nothing wrong with the Canadian Parliament applauding a man "who fought for his country", although acknowledging in the circumstances "this may not have been correct". The Ukrainian Canadian Congress said in a statement that there were "difficult and painful pages in the common history of the communities that have taken up residence in Ukraine" and said it recognized that "recent events that have brought these pages to the forefront have caused pain and anguish". President Zelenskyy did not comment on the incident.

Following the incident, an image of a fake Ukrainian postage stamp featuring Hunka was shared on Twitter by multiple users, including the Russian embassy in the U.K. According to James L. Turk, Russian responses were designed to cause their conduct of war in Ukraine to appear more legitimate. He called the scandal "a gold mine for Russian propagandists". According to Marcus Kolga of the Macdonald–Laurier Institute, the scandal has had an effect of damaging Canada's reputation abroad, and Russia is aiming to amplify this effect through propaganda.

In the days following the scandal several neo-Nazis laid flowers on the SS Galicia monument in Oakville, Ontario. On social media they thanked Hunka and said the SS division fought to defend Europe from "the Asiatic-Communist pestilence". Those actions were condemned by Jewish groups and renewed their demands for the demolition of the memorial.

In a speech on 5 October 2023 at the annual meeting of the Valdai Discussion Club Russian president Vladimir Putin stated that the fact that Hunka was applauded by President Zelenskyy was "a sign of the Nazification of Ukraine" and: "This is precisely why it is necessary to denazify Ukraine." He further said that Rota "essentially lumped together Nazi collaborators, SS troops and the Ukrainian military of today", which "only confirms [Russia's] thesis that one of [Russia's] goals in Ukraine is denazification". Asked to comment, deputy prime minister of Canada Chrystia Freeland responded by saying that Putin was being effective at "weaponizing [the] mistake", urged the Canadian public to be cautious of Russian propaganda and to "push back very, very hard at everything Vladimir Putin says", and reiterated that actions causing Hunka to be recognized in the Parliament were a "terrible mistake".

In the wake of the controversy, Hunka's family were reported to have gone into hiding in their hometown of North Bay, and did not respond to interview requests. Hunka's daughter-in-law was quoted as saying her family was "shocked at what happened"; according to a family friend, they had not known in advance that Hunka would be publicly recognized by the House Speaker, and had only expected "he would be in the same room" as President Zelenskyy.

=== Rota's resignation and House motion ===
On 26 September, Rota announced his resignation over the controversy. The day prior, government house leader Karina Gould had filed a motion to strike the recognition of Hunka from the official record. The motion ignited heated debate and failed to gain the necessary unanimous support. On 26 September, the House of Commons unanimously adopted a motion by Yves-François Blanchet to "utterly condemn Nazism in all its forms" and express "full solidarity with all victims of Nazism, past and present." The motion also condemned the invitation extended to Hunka, and formally withdrew his recognition by the House.

=== Discussions of extradition ===
On 26 September, Polish education minister Przemysław Czarnek stated in a Twitter post that he had taken steps towards the possible extradition of Hunka. In the post, Czarnek said: "In view of the scandalous events in the Canadian Parliament, which involved honoring a member of the criminal Nazi SS Galizien formation in the presence of President Zelenskyy, I have taken steps towards the possible extradition of this man to Poland. #NOForFalsifyingHistory!" Czarnek asked the Institute of National Remembrance to urgently research whether Hunka was wanted for "crimes against the Polish Nation and Poles of Jewish origin".

On 20 October, Russia's Investigative Committee said in a statement that it had charged Hunka with "genocide of civilians on the territory of the Ukrainian SSR during the Great Patriotic War", stating that Hunka and other members of the division had killed "at least 500 citizens of the USSR" in Huta Pieniacka. The statement also said that investigators were considering issuing an international arrest warrant for Hunka.

== See also ==
- Bitburg controversy
- Dragutin Kamber
- Peter Savaryn
- Memorial to the Victims of Communism (Canada)
- Memorials in Canada to Nazis and Nazi collaborators
