= Podkamień massacre =

1944 killing of Poles during World War II

Coordinates: 49°56′40″N 25°19′25″E

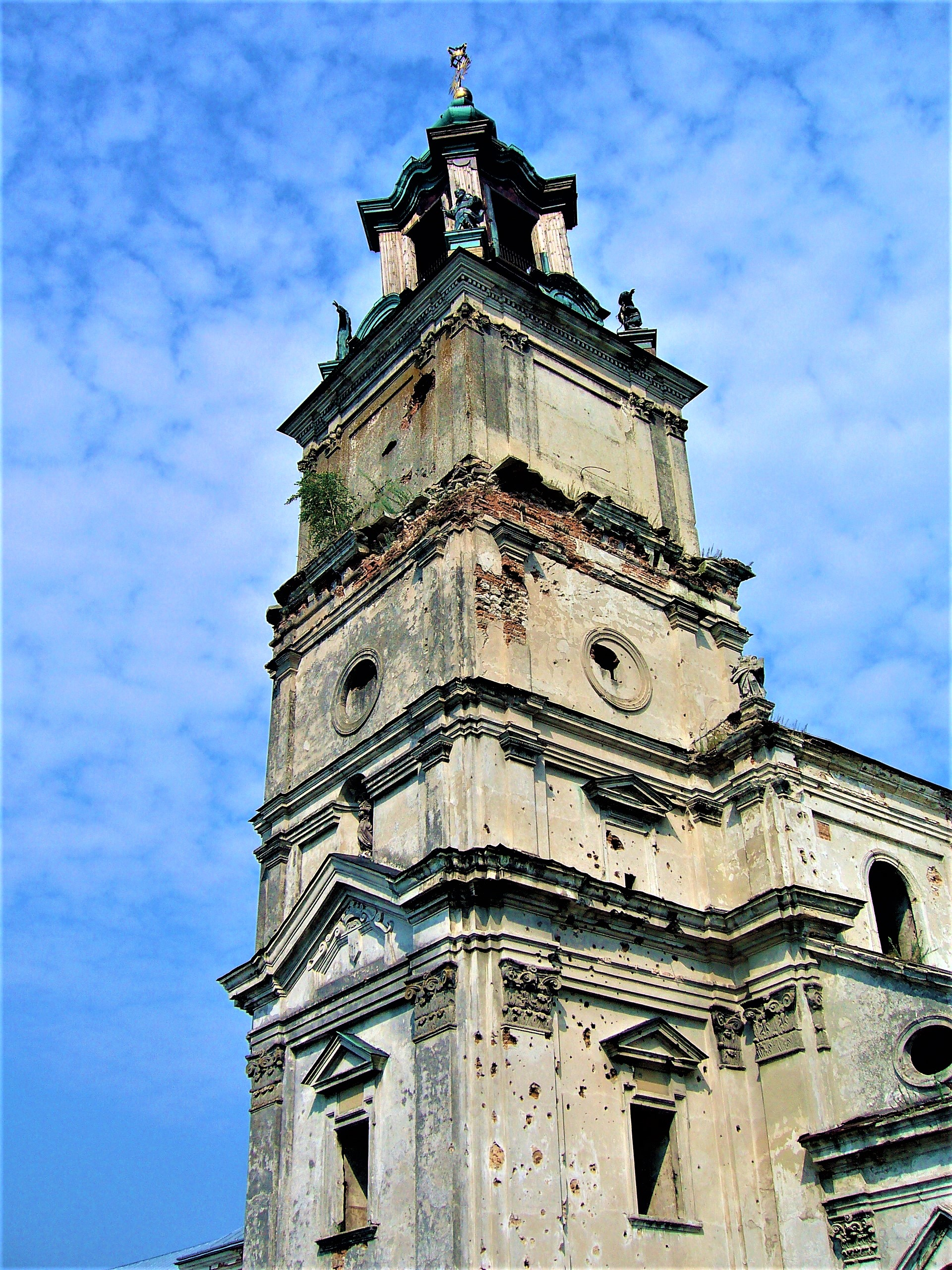
Bullet marks on the Church of Ascension at the Podkamień Abbey, stormed by UPA on 12 March 1944

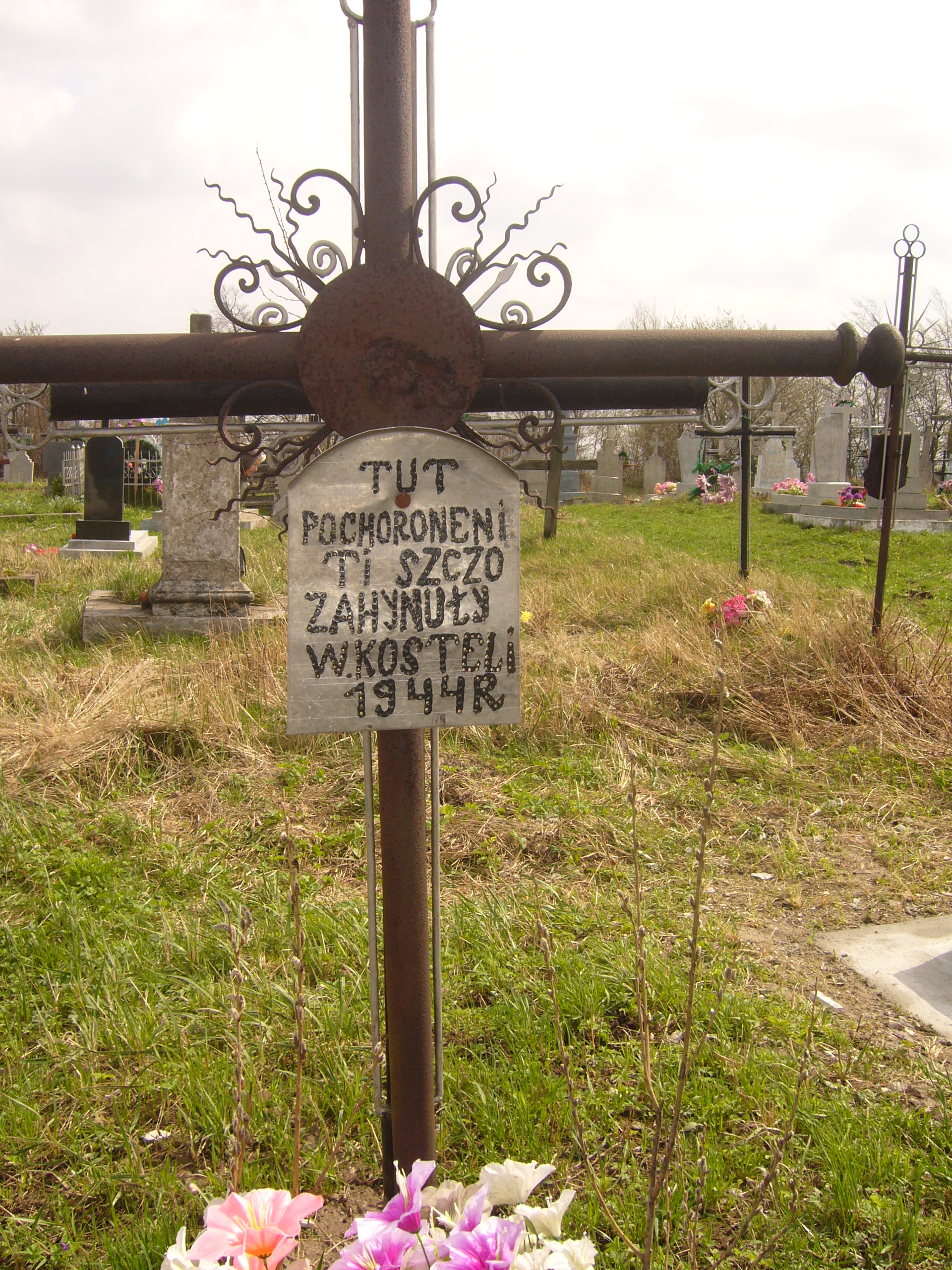
Polish graveyard in Podkamień

The Podkamień massacre or the Pidkamin massacre of 12 March 1944 was the massacre of Polish civilians committed by the Ukrainian Insurgent Army (UPA) under the command of Maksym Skorupsky (Maks). The victims were ethnic Polish residents of Podkamień, Tarnopol Voivodeship (now Pidkamin, Zolochiv Raion, Ukraine). During the war the area was administratively part of the Nazi German Reichskommissariat Ukraine (now Ternopil Oblast). Estimates of victims include 150, more than 250 and up to 1000.

== Prelude ==
During World War II, Podkamień was a shelter for Poles from the neighbouring province of Volhynia, who had escaped the Massacres of Poles in Volhynia and sought refuge in the local Dominican monastery. The complex was surrounded by walls and was located on a hill that dominated the surrounding area and as a result provided a relatively safe haven for refugees. Around 2,000 people were living at Podkamień town and the monastery when it was attacked in March 1944, by the UPA.

== The massacre ==
Beginning in 1943, during the period of massacres of Poles in Eastern Galicia by the Ukrainian Insurgent Army, large groups of Polish refugees began to flee to Podkamień, seeking refuge in the town and the monastery. The Poles formed a self-defense unit, led by Kazimierz Sołtysik. The unit began to be problematic for the Germans as the Soviet army approached. The Germans wanted to get rid of this unit, so they offered the "Maks" unit, with whom they had cooperated in the fight against the Soviets, to seize Podkamień.

On the first day of the attack it was repelled by a small self-defence group, and that night some of the inhabitants managed to escape. The next day the UIA promised to spare the inhabitants' lives in exchange for the surrender of the monastery. According to the journalist, Sol Littman, while the monastery was being evacuated, the UIA opened fire and entered the monastery complex, and massacred a number of people, including the clergy. The bodies of the dead were then thrown into the well. Afterwards the UIA camped in the nearby town of Podkamień, and between the 12–16 March repeatedly attacked people hiding in the villages. On 16 March, as the Soviet Red Army approached, the UIA withdrew from the area.

== Aftermath ==
According to Henryk Komański and Szczepan Siekierka, approximately 100 ethnic Poles were murdered in the monastery, and an additional 500 were killed in the town of Podkamień itself. In the nearby village of Palikrowy, 365 Poles were killed. Armed Ukrainian groups destroyed the monastery, stealing all the valuables, except for the monastery's crowned icon. Tadeusz Piotrowski who based his findings on the Home Army or German Police sources, estimates that the victims in the monastery and adjacent villages numbered 1000. Among the survivors was the renowned writer and painter, Leopold Buczkowski.

== See also ==
- Historiography of the Volyn tragedy
- Massacres of Poles in Volhynia
- Huta Pieniacka massacre
- Chodaczkow Wielki massacre
- Palikrowy massacre

== Sources ==
- Motyka, Grzegorz (2006). Ukraińska partyzantka 1942-1960. Działalność Organizacji Ukraińskich Nacjonalistów i Ukraińskiej Powstańczej Armii [Ukrainian partisans 1942-1960. Activities of the Organization of Ukrainian Nationalists and the Ukrainian Insurgent Army] (in Polish). Warsaw.
- Per Anders Rudling, They Defended Ukraine’: The 14. Waffen-Grenadier-Division der SS (Galizische Nr. 1) Revisited, The Journal of Slavic Military Studies, 25:3, 329-368 online version.
