= Huta Pieniacka massacre =

1944 massacre of Poles by Ukrainian Nazi collaborators

Coordinates: 49°54′7.2″N 25°5′56.4″E

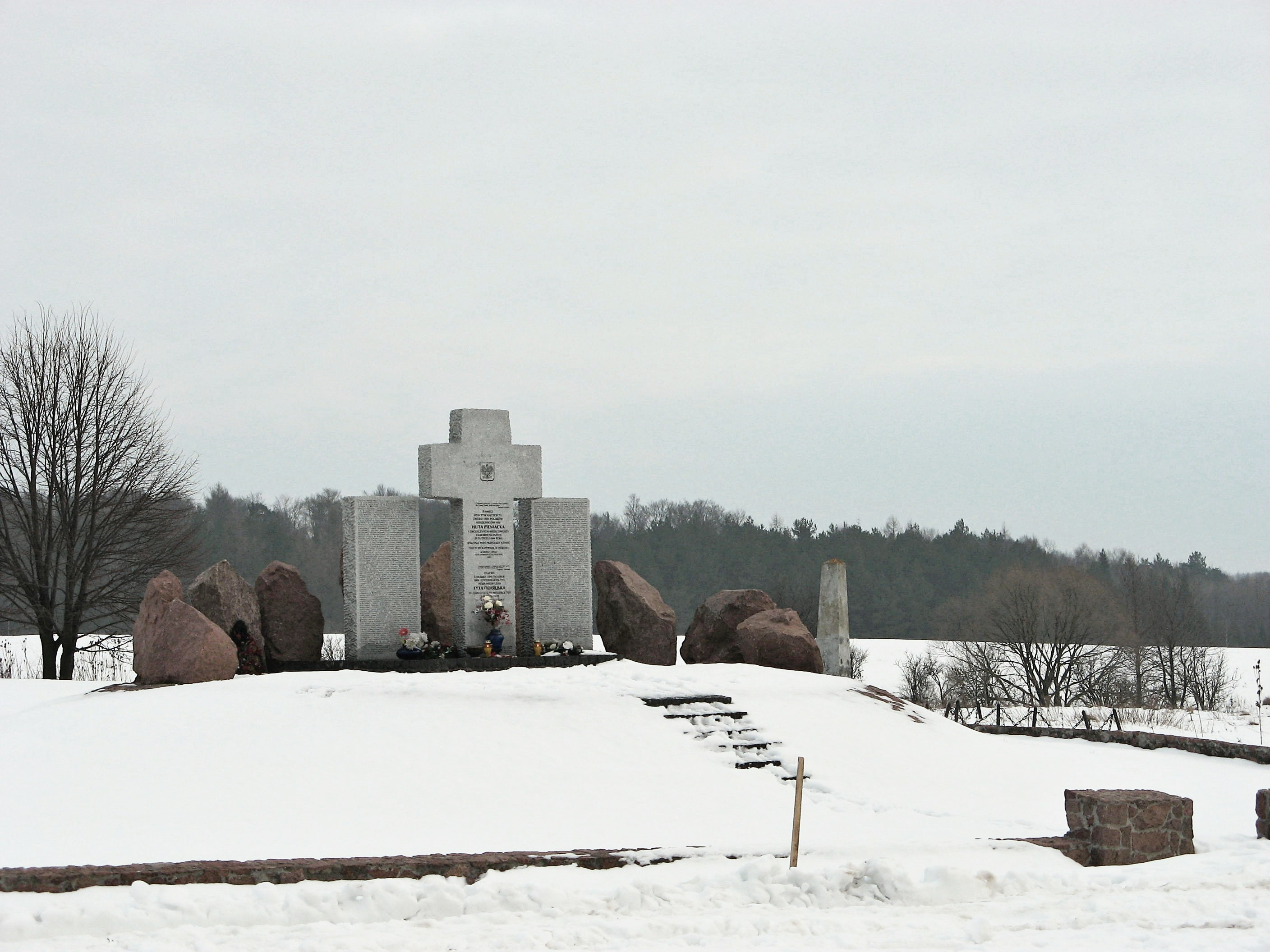
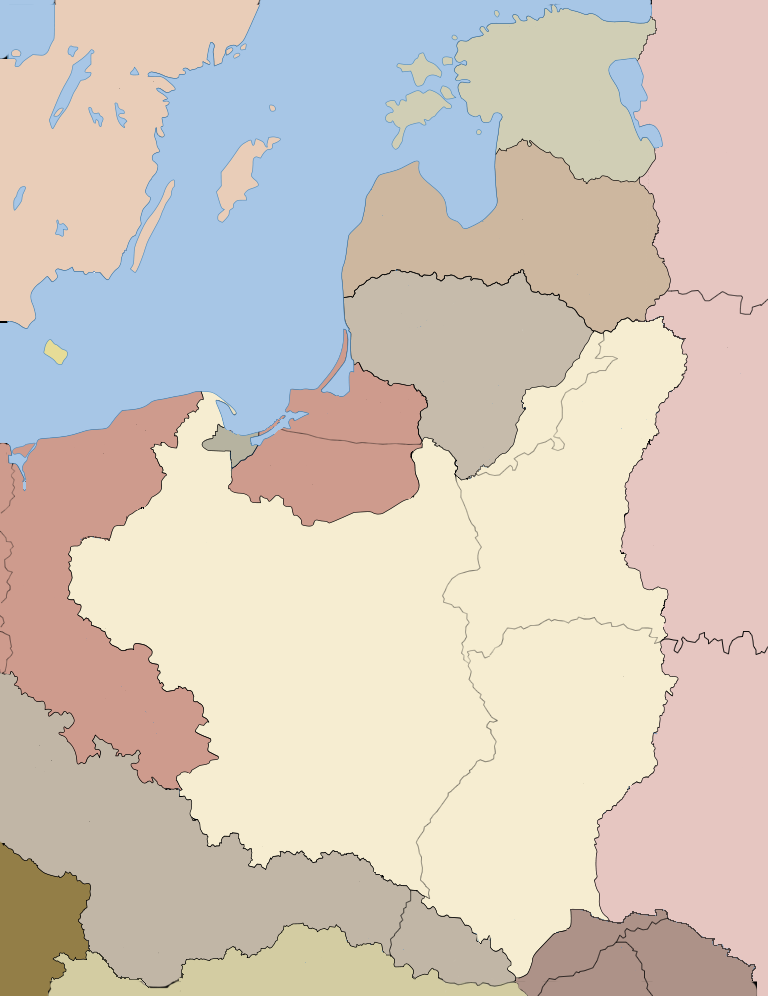
- Monument at the site of the village Location of Huta Pieniacka massacre (map of Poland before the 1939 invasion)
- Date: 28 February 1944
- Location: Huta Pieniacka, Occupied Poland (Nazi German Distrikt Galizien)
- Type: Massacre of Polish inhabitants
- Motive: Anti-Catholicism, Anti-Polish sentiment, Greater Ukraine, Ukrainisation
- Participants: Ukrainian ultranationalists: 4th SS Volunteer Galician Regiment; 14th Waffen Grenadier Division of the SS (1st Galician); Ukrainian Insurgent Army (allegedly)
- Deaths: 500–800

The Huta Pieniacka massacre was a mass murder of the Polish inhabitants of the village Huta Pieniacka, located in modern-day Brody hromada, Lviv Oblast, Ukraine, which took place on 28 February 1944. Estimates of the number of victims range from 500 (Timothy Snyder) to 600-800 (Grzegorz Motyka) to 1,200 (Sol Littman).

A 2003 investigation by the Polish Institute of National Remembrance and a 2005 investigation by the Institute of History at the Ukrainian Academy of Sciences both concluded that the Galician SS carried out a massacre of civilians. They disagree on the scale and on the balance of responsibility between the Ukrainians and their German commanders. According to the Polish Institute of National Remembrance, —700 to 1,500 people, including around 1,000 Huta Pieniacka residents, plus people from surrounding villages who had sought refuge in the village, were killed, and the action was committed by the 4th SS Volunteer Galician Regiment and 14th Waffen Grenadier Division of the SS (1st Galician). Polish witnesses testified that the orders were given by German officers. According to Polish witness accounts and scholarly publications, German Nazi policemen were accompanied by a paramilitary unit of Ukrainian nationalists under Włodzimierz Czerniawski's command, including members of the UPA and inhabitants of local villages who intended to seize property found in the households of the murdered.

According to the Ukrainian investigation, the dead numbered 500, and the massacre was committed by Waffen-SS Galizien–affiliated soldiers under the initiative of SS Police regiments. The Warsaw division of the "Commission for the punishment of crimes against the Polish people" launched an investigation in July 2001.

== Background ==
Huta Pieniacka was a village of about 1,000 ethnically Polish inhabitants in 200 houses, located in the Tarnopol Voivodeship, Poland. In 1939, following joint German and Soviet attack on Poland, the voivodeship was annexed by the Soviet Union, becoming part of the Ukrainian Soviet Socialist Republic. After the 1941 German attack on the Soviet Union, it fell under German occupation.

The village was a major Polish resistance centre, fighting against German forces and the Ukrainian Insurgent Army. In January and February 1944, Soviet troops were frequent visitors, and this was noticed by both the Ukrainians and the Germans. An armed stronghold, Huta Pieniacka had fought off several attacks in 1943 and early 1944.

== Massacre ==
On 23 February 1944, a patrol of the 4th SS Police Regiment composed of Ukrainian volunteers, approached Huta Pieniacka. There was a skirmish with the local Polish self-defense in which two SS soldiers were killed. A unit of the Ukrainian Insurgent Army came to the aid of the patrol and the SS was able to withdraw. The German occupation force therefore ordered the "pacification" of the village.

Kazimierz Wojciechowski (who was burnt alive that day), commandant of Polish forces in the village, had been informed by the Polish Home Army of the approaching enemy around two hours before the attack, and told to refrain from fighting, hide or remove weapons, and evacuate leaving only women, children and the elderly behind. The Poles however, had too little time to prepare a defense or to escape, and only some young residents managed to flee.

The attack commenced around 5-6 am, and the village was surrounded by 500-600 Ukrainian and German fighters. It was shelled by artillery. The attackers herded the villagers into their barns, set fire to the village and it burned all day. According to Bogusława Marcinkowska, a prosecutor of the Branch Commission for the Prosecution of Crimes against the Polish Nation in Krakow, the SS threw one infant against a wall and cut open the stomach of a pregnant woman. According to witnesses, the massacre was observed by a German reconnaissance plane. The perpetrators left at 5 pm. Many of them were drunk and singing songs. Only four houses remained, and on the next day a mass funeral took place. Those who survived escaped to Zloczow and other towns, never to return.

Witnesses interrogated by the Polish prosecutors of "The Head Commission for the Prosecution of Crimes against the Polish Nation" described the details of crimes committed against women, children and newborn babies. After murdering the inhabitants of Huta Pieniacka, the local Ukrainian population looted the remaining property of the murdered, loading everything on horse-drawn carts that had been prepared beforehand. According to those Poles who survived, the Germans did not participate in the massacre itself.

In the April 9, 2008, issue of the Gazeta Polska weekly, an article about the massacre appeared. According to those persons who survived (four of whom were cited), the murderers were Ukrainian collaborators. All those who recollected the massacre (Emilia Bernacka, then 10; Filomena Franczukowska, then 20; Jozefa Orlowska, then 16; and Regina Wroblewska, then 6) claimed that the village was attacked by the Ukrainian troops, who murdered all Poles they managed to catch, including infants. The mentioned persons survived because somebody managed to open the rear door of a village church in which the murderers were massacring the Polish civilians.

Filomena Franczukowska, who was 20 then and is the oldest still-living survivor of the massacre (as of April 2008) stated in the Gazeta Polska article that the Ukrainians came to the village at 4 am. They entered Huta Pieniacka from the nearby village of Zarkow and began shooting at everybody. Her father had been beaten before being executed, and one of the attackers said loudly in Ukrainian: "Now you have your Poland and your England." Franczukowska lost both parents and three younger siblings in the massacre; only her brother survived. She said that the murderers deliberately did not kill two twin boys, aged 4, and were laughing at the children who were trying to 'wake up' their dead mother. Franczukowska, together with her brother and a group of people, was ordered to go to a barn which was locked and set on fire. She somehow managed to open the rear door and escape to a forest. "Now they say they do not know who did it, but it is enough to visit neighboring Ukrainian villages, one can still see remnants of the stolen property. The locals remember this event and this is why none of them has settled in Huta Pieniacka since then," she said.

The weekly publication of the Polish Home Army – the Biuletyn Ziemi Czerwienskiej (Land of Czerwien Bulletin) for 26 March 1944 (№ 12) [216, p. 8] stated that during the Battle at Pidkamin and Brody, Soviet forces took a couple of hundred soldiers of the SS Galizien division prisoner. All were immediately shot in the Zbarazh castle on the basis that two weeks earlier they had apparently taken part in the killing of the Polish inhabitants of Huta Pienacka, and as a result could not be categorized as prisoners of war.

After the massacre, some local AK commanders forbade Polish strongholds from sheltering Soviet partisans in order to minimize the risk of those self-defence posts' destruction.

The village of Huta Pieniacka no longer exists. Most of the houses were burned during the massacre and only the school and a Roman Catholic church remained. Both of these buildings were demolished after the war, and in the area of the village there is a pasture for cattle. There is a post with a Ukrainian inscription Center of the former village, but it does not mention the name of the village.

== In modern Poland ==
The Warsaw branch of the Polish Institute of National Remembrance (IPN) started an investigation into the massacre in November 1992. The investigation was subsequently suspended between 1997 and 2001, and as of 2008 is being conducted by the Kraków branch of the Institute.

The Institute of History of Ukraine of the Ukrainian Academy of Sciences investigated the events at Huta Pieniacka and concluded that the 4th and 5th SS Police regiments did indeed kill the civilians within the village. It noted that at the time of the massacre the police regiments were not under 14th division command but rather under German police command (specifically, under German Sicherheitsdienst and SS command of the General Government). During this time, these units maintained a close relationship with local UPA units.

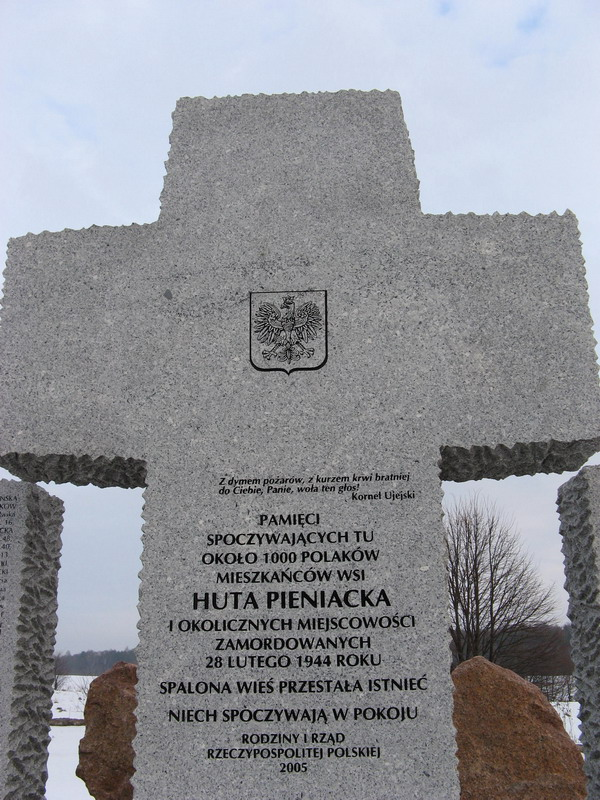
Table on monument

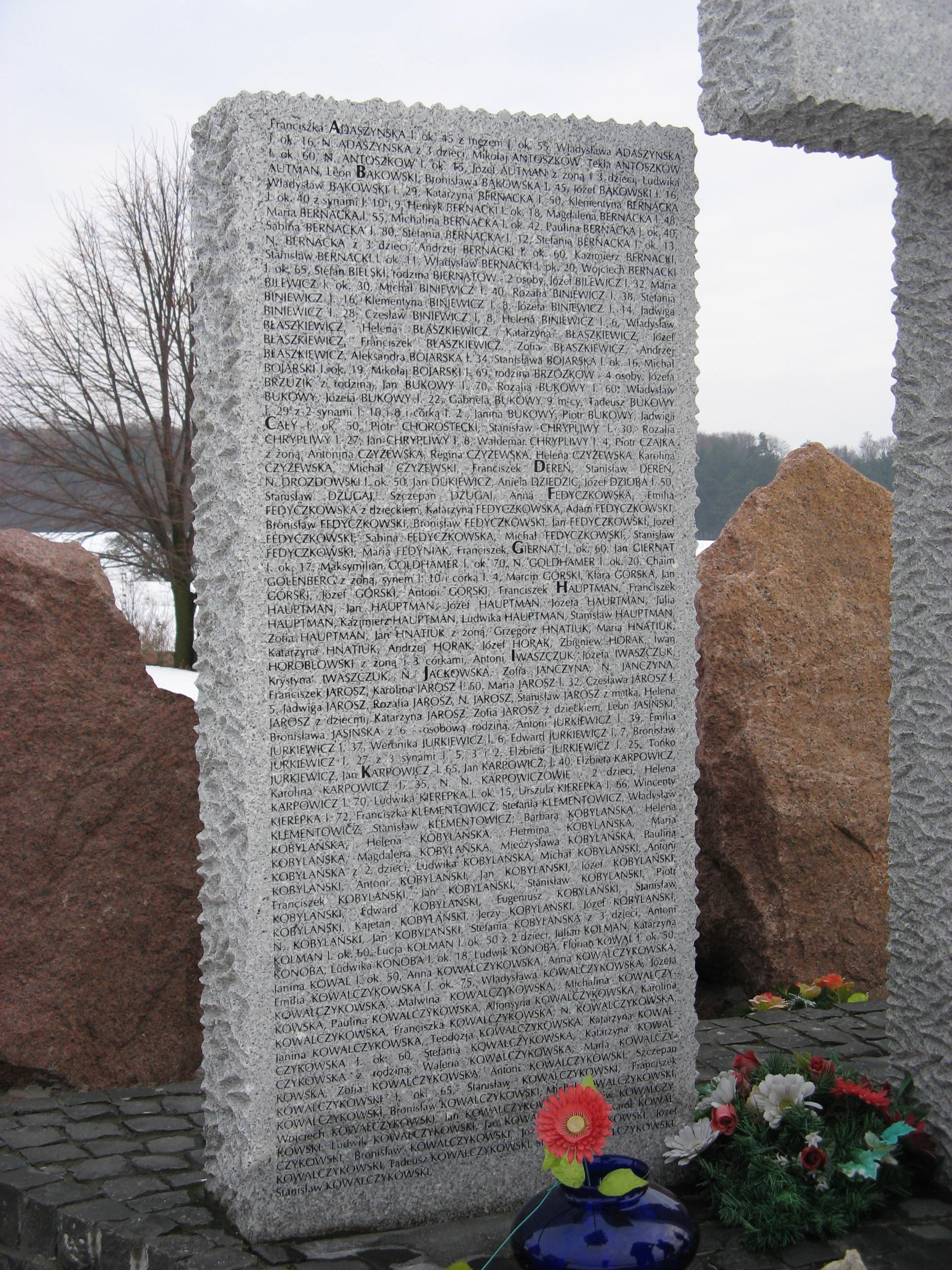
One of the tables on monument with names of murdered Poles

On 28 February 1989 a memorial was built on the site of the previous village, but was soon destroyed. A new monument commemorating the victims was erected in 2005 and unveiled on 21 October 2005. During the unveiling the consul put the blame of the massacre on the Ukrainians in his speech, stating, "On 28 February 1944, when the 'SS Galizien' together with other Ukrainian nationalists did horrible things as told by a contemporary, they shot mothers, children and murdered..."

Ukraine sent a note of protest regarding the fact that the Polish consul had ignored the Ukrainian government completely when opening the monument, that the new monument did not adhere to "Ukrainian laws" and was erected without the "necessary permits".

As a result of actions by the parliamentarian Oleh Tyahnybok, a note of protest regarding the "illegal erection" of the monument was sent out and the Polish consul was declared a persona non grata for "degrading the national dignity of the Ukrainian people".

On February 28, 2007 a new monument was unveiled to the Poles who had been killed in the atrocities at Huta Pieniacka. A delegation from Poland led by the vice consul of Culture for the Polish consulate in Lviv, Marcin Zieniewicz, stated that the occasion marked one of the most tragic pages in the history of not only the Polish people, but also of the Ukrainian people. On February 28, 2009 the presidents of Ukraine and Poland met at the monument to commemorate the massacre.

In January 2017, the Monument to Polish WWII massacre victims was desecrated with fascist symbols in Ukraine. A cross made of stone was blown up, while two tables with the names of the Poles killed in the 1944 massacre were graffitied with the flag of Ukraine and the flag of the Ukrainian Insurgent Army. The Polish Foreign Ministry condemned the attack on the monument. In a statement published on its website, it called for an "immediate" investigation, saying those behind it must be punished. "Incidents like this threaten relations between the two nations", the statement added. The monument was rebuilt on behalf of the local Ukrainian community and unveiled on 26 February 2017.

On 22 September 2023, Yaroslav Hunka, a veteran of an SS division implicated in the massacre, was invited to the Parliament of Canada along with Ukrainian President Volodymyr Zelenskyy, where they both received standing ovations from Canadian Prime Minister Justin Trudeau and most MPs. Following international criticism, including from the Simon Wiesenthal Center, the Speaker of the House of Commons Anthony Rota apologized on the 24th for inviting the veteran stating "I have subsequently become aware of more information which causes me to regret my decision [to honour Hunka]. I wish to make clear that no one, including fellow parliamentarians and the Ukraine delegation, was aware of my intention or of my remarks before I delivered them". He resigned as Speaker on the 26th while remaining an MP.

== See also ==
- List of massacres in Ukraine
- Historiography of the Volyn tragedy
- Massacres of Poles in Volhynia
- Chodaczków Wielki massacre
- Pidkamin massacre
