= Baryliv =

Village in Lviv Oblast, Ukraine

Baryliv Барилів
- Village
- Location within Ukraine Location within Lviv Oblast
- Coordinates: 50°20′28″N 24°51′59″E
- Country: Ukraine
- Oblast: Lviv Oblast
- Raion: Sheptytskyi Raion
- Established: 1575

Area
  - Total: 148 km^{2} (57 sq mi)
- Elevation /(average value of): 203 m (666 ft)

Population
  - Total: 295
  - Density: 28,851/km^{2} (74,720/sq mi)
- Time zone: UTC+2 (EET)
  - Summer (DST): UTC+3 (EEST)
- Postal code: 80231
- Area code: +380 3255
- Website: село Барилів ^{(Ukrainian)}

Baryliv (Ukrainian: Бари́лів) is a small village (selo) in Sheptytskyi Raion, Lviv Oblast of Western Ukraine. It belongs to Lopatyn settlement hromada, one of the hromadas of Ukraine. The area of the village is just 1,48 km^{2} and the population of village is just about 295 persons. Local government is administered by Barylivska village council.

== Geography ==
The village Baryliv is situated in the north of Lviv region (Lviv Oblast ), near the borders of Volyn Oblast. It is at a distance from the regional center Lviv 105 kilometres (65 mi) , 21 kilometres (13 mi) from the district center Radekhiv, and 77 kilometres (48 mi) from the administrative center of Volyn Oblast – Lutsk.

== History ==
The oldest record of the village refers to 1448. Although the official founding date of the village dates back to the year 1575.
From 1919 to 1939 village Baryliv together with the Radekhiv Raion was annexed to the Lwów Voivodeship, Second Polish Republic. After the war, the territory was passed to the Soviet Union. Since 1991 it has been part of independent Ukraine.

Until 18 July 2020, Baryliv belonged to Radekhiv Raion. The raion was abolished in July 2020 as part of the administrative reform of Ukraine, which reduced the number of raions of Lviv Oblast to seven. The area of Radekhiv Raion was merged into Chervonohrad Raion.

== Cult constructions and religion ==
In the village has an old wooden church, which is registered in the Catalog Wooden Churches of Ukraine. It is the Church of St. Simeon 1885 (wooden).

== Famous people ==
- Myron Tarnavsky (1869 – 1938) – a supreme commander of the Ukrainian Galician Army, the military of the West Ukrainian People's Republic. He was born into a family of priests in the village Baryliv, Lviv region.

== Literature ==
- Історія міст і сіл УРСР : Львівська область, Тершів. – К. : ГРУРЕ, 1968 р. Page 635 (in Ukrainian)
- Василь Слободян, КАТАЛОГ ІСНУЮЧИХ ДЕРЕВ'ЯНИХ ЦЕРКОВ УКРАЇНИ І УКРАЇНСЬКИХ ЕТНІЧНИХ ЗЕМЕЛЬ (in Ukrainian)
