= Smorzhiv, Lviv Oblast =

Rural locality in Lviv Oblast, Ukraine

Smorzhiv Сморжів
- Location in Lviv Oblast Smorzhiv (Ukraine)
- Coordinates: 50°17′49″N 25°1′5″E
- Country: Ukraine
- Oblast: Lviv Oblast
- Raion: Sheptytskyi Raion
- Hromada: Lopatyn settlement hromada
- Time zone: UTC+2 (EET)
  - Summer (DST): UTC+3 (EEST)
- Postal code: 80234

Smorzhiv (Ukrainian: Сморжів, Polish: Smarzów) is a village in the Lopatyn settlement hromada of the Sheptytskyi Raion of Lviv Oblast in Ukraine.

== History ==
On 19 July 2020, as a result of the administrative-territorial reform and liquidation of the Radekhiv Raion, the village became part of the Chervonohrad Raion (now Sheptytskyi Raion).

In the Second Polish Republic, until 1934, the village constituted an independent rural municipality (gmina) within Radziechów County of the Tarnopol Voivodeship. As part of the consolidation reform, on August 1, 1934, it was incorporated into the newly established rural Szczurowice in the same county and voivodeship. After World War II, the village became part of the administrative structures of the Soviet Union.

During the Nazi German occupation, the Polish family Miniewski, who lived in the village, provided help to Jewish: Izaak Sterling and Józef (Yossel) Parnas. In 1984, the Yad Vashem decided to award Stefan Miniewski and his son Jan the title of Righteous Among the Nations.

== Notable residents ==
- Yulian Butsmaniuk (1885–1967), Ukrainian artist and monumentalist, student of Modest Sosenko. He was a senior officer of the Ukrainian Insurgent Army and the Ukrainian Galician Army.
- Stefan Miniewski (1889-1944/1945), Polish Righteous Among the Nations

== Bibliography ==
- "Smarzów". Geographical Dictionary of the Kingdom of Poland (in Polish). 10. Warszawa: Kasa im. Józefa Mianowskiego. 1889. p. 867.
- "Lochy". Geographical Dictionary of the Kingdom of Poland (in Polish). 5. Warszawa: Kasa im. Józefa Mianowskiego. 1884. p. 362.
