= Korchyn =

Korchyn (Ukrainian: Корчин) is an inhabited locality in Ukraine and it may refer to:

- Korchyn, Chervonohrad Raion, Lviv Oblast, a village in Chervonohrad Raion, Lviv Oblast
- Korchyn, Stryi Raion, Lviv Oblast, a village in Stryi Raion, Lviv Oblast
- Korchyn, Rivne Oblast, a village in Kostopil Raion, Rivne Oblast
