= Novyi Vytkiv =

Rural locality in Lviv Oblast, Ukraine

Novyi Vytkiv Новий Витків
- Location in Lviv Oblast Novyi Vytkiv (Ukraine)
- Coordinates: 50°18′40″N 24°29′32″E
- Country: Ukraine
- Oblast: Lviv Oblast
- Raion: Sheptytskyi Raion
- Hromada: Radekhiv urban hromada
- Time zone: UTC+2 (EET)
  - Summer (DST): UTC+3 (EEST)
- Postal code: 80217

Novyi Vytkiv (Ukrainian: Новий Витків) is a village in the Radekhiv urban hromada of the Sheptytskyi Raion of Lviv Oblast in Ukraine.

== History ==
The first written mention of the village was in 1469.

On 19 July 2020, as a result of the administrative-territorial reform and liquidation of the Radekhiv Raion, the village became part of the Sheptytskyi Raion.

== Religion ==
There are two active UGCC churches in the village:

- Church of the Ascension (1910)
- Church of the Transfiguration (1738)

== Notable residents ==
- Oleksandr Dzioban (1931–2022), Ukrainian bibliographer and archaeographer

== Bibliography ==
- "(2) W. Nowy, miasteczko, pow. kamionecki". Geographical Dictionary of the Kingdom of Poland (in Polish). 13. Warszawa: Kasa im. Józefa Mianowskiego. 1893. p. 667.
- Tomasz Kunzek. Przewodnik po województwie Tarnopolskim (z mapą).— Rzeszów Libra PL, 2013.— 140 s.— S. 68.
