= Vuzlove, Lviv Oblast =

Rural locality in Lviv Oblast, Ukraine

Vuzlove
- Village
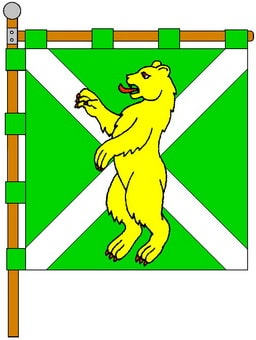
- Flag Coat of arms

- Location within Lviv Oblast Location within Ukraine
- Coordinates: 50°14′N 24°33′E
- Country: Ukraine
- Oblast: Lviv Oblast
- Raion: Chervonohrad Raion
- Hromada: Radekhiv urban hromada

Population (2001)
  - Total: 1,604

Vuzlove (Ukrainian: Вузлове), until 1946 known as Kholoiv (Ukrainian: Холоїв; Polish: Chołojów), is a village in Lviv Oblast, Ukraine located in Chervonohrad Raion. It belongs to Radekhiv urban hromada, one of the hromadas of Ukraine. In 2020 it was inhabited by 1489 people.

== History ==
On 14 August 1920, during the Polish–Soviet War, the village was a site of the battle between Polish and Russian forces, with Russian FSR being the victorious side. While under the control of Second Polish Republic, the village was located within Gmina Chołojów, Radziechów County, Tarnopol Voivodeship. In 1921 it was inhabited by 4151 people.

Until 18 July 2020, Vuzlove belonged to Radekhiv Raion. The raion was abolished in July 2020 as part of the administrative reform of Ukraine, which reduced the number of raions of Lviv Oblast to seven. The area of Radekhiv Raion was merged into Chervonohrad Raion.
