= Oleksandr Dzioban =

Ukrainian bibliographer and archaeographer (1931–2022)

- Олександр Онуфрійович Дзьобан
- Born: 12 September 1931; Novyi Vytkiv, Second Polish Republic (now Lviv Oblast, Ukraine)
- Died: 18 September 2022 (aged 91); Lviv
- Education: University of Lviv
- Occupations: Bibliographer, archaeographer

Oleksandr Dzioban (Ukrainian: Олександр Онуфрійович Дзьобан; 12 September 1931 – 18 September 2022) was a Ukrainian bibliographer and archaeographer.

== Biography ==
Oleksandr Dzioban was born on 12 September 1931, in Novyi Vytkiv, Second Polish Republic (now Radekhiv Hromada, Sheptytskyi Raion, Lviv Oblast, Ukraine).

In 1956, he graduated from the Faculty of History at University of Lviv. In 1952, he began working as a teacher. From 1959, he was active in the manuscript department of the Lviv Scientific Library, where he held the positions of bibliographer, chief bibliographer, research fellow, and from 1992, he was the head of the department.

From 1991, he became a member of the Commission of Special (Auxiliary) Historical Disciplines, which operated at the Shevchenko Scientific Society in Lviv.

He died on 18 September 2022, in Lviv. He was buried in his native village.

== Works ==
Dzioban authored more than 200 scholarly publications, including 13 works that were released as separate editions (bibliographic indexes, catalogs, and historical and local history studies).

He was a compiler of bibliographic indexes, specifically:

- "Osobysti arkhivni fondy viddilu rukopysiv: Anotovanyi pokazhchyk" (1977; 1995, co-author),
- "Notoliniini rukopysy ХVI–XVII st.: Kataloh" (1979, co-author),
- "Rukopysy arkhivu M. S. Shashkevycha" (1979),
- "Mariika Pidhirianka" (1981, co-author),
- "Ostap Terletskyi: Pokazhchyk drukovanykh i rukopysnykh materialiv" (1984; co-author),
- "Ivan Vahylevych: Pokazhchyk rukopysnykh prats ta materialiv do biohrafii" (1986).

Other publications:

- "Istoriia Novoho Vytkova" (2006),
- photo album "Novyi Vytkiv – kolyka rodu Myshuhiv" (2009).

Dzioban published letters and other important documents of such prominent figures as Ivan Mazepa, Bohdan Lepkyi, Lesia Ukrainka, Klyment Kvitka, Ahatanhel Krymskyi, and Ivan Nechui-Levytskyi.

== Awards ==
- Jubilee medal of the Adam Mickiewicz Literary Society (Warsaw, Poland).

== Bibliography ==
- Dzoban Oleksandr Onufriiovych / H. V. Demian // Encyclopedia of Modern Ukraine [Online] / Eds. : I. М. Dziuba, A. I. Zhukovsky, M. H. Zhelezniak [et al.] ; National Academy of Sciences of Ukraine, Shevchenko Scientific Society. – Kyiv : The NASU institute of Encyclopedic Research, 2007, upd. 2024.
- Прокопенко Н. П. Дзьобан Олександр Онуфрійович // Українська бібліотечна енциклопедія, 2023.
- Трегуб М. Дзьобан Олександр Онуфрійович // Українська журналістика в іменах. Л., 2000. Вип. 7.
- Олександр Дзьобан: Бібліогр. покажч. Л., 2006.
