= Andriivka, Sheptytskyi Raion, Lviv Oblast =

Village in Lviv Oblast, Ukraine

Andriivka Андрі́ївка
- Village
- Location within Lviv Oblast Location within Ukraine
- Coordinates: 50°21′38″N 24°26′09″E
- Country: Ukraine
- Oblast: Lviv Oblast
- Raion: Sheptytskyi Raion

Andriivka (Ukrainian: Андрі́ївка) is a village in Sheptytskyi Raion, Lviv Oblast, Western Ukraine. It belongs to Radekhiv urban hromada, one of the hromadas of Ukraine.

Andriivka is the site of an ancient mega-settlement dating to 4000–3600 B.C. belonging to the Cucuteni-Trypillian culture. The settlement was for the time very large, covering an area of 80 hectares. This proto-city is just one of 2440 Cucuteni-Trypillia settlements discovered so far in Moldova and Ukraine. 194 (8%) of these settlements had an area of more than 10 hectares between 5000–2700 B.C. and more than 29 settlements had an area in the range 100–300–450 hectares.

Until 18 July 2020, Andriivka belonged to Radekhiv Raion. The raion was abolished in July 2020 as part of the administrative reform of Ukraine, which reduced the number of raions of Lviv Oblast to seven. The area of Radekhiv Raion was merged into Sheptytskyi Raion, which was then known as Chervonohrad Raion.

== See also ==
- Cucuteni-Trypillian culture
- Danube civilization
