= Ohliadiv =

Rural locality in Lviv Oblast, Ukraine

Ohliadiv Оглядів
- Location in Lviv Oblast Ohliadiv (Ukraine)
- Coordinates: 50°11′48″N 24°41′51″E
- Country: Ukraine
- Oblast: Lviv Oblast
- Raion: Sheptytskyi Raion
- Hromada: Radekhiv urban hromada
- Time zone: UTC+2 (EET)
  - Summer (DST): UTC+3 (EEST)
- Postal code: 80256

Ohliadiv (Ukrainian: Оглядів) is a village in the Radekhiv urban hromada of the Sheptytskyi Raion of Lviv Oblast in Ukraine.

== History ==
The first written mention of the village was in 1426.

After the liquidation of the Radekhiv Raion on 19 July 2020, the village became part of the Chervonohrad Raion (now Sheptytskyi Raion).

== Religion ==
- Church of the Dormition of the Miraculous Icon of the Blessed Virgin Mary with the Child Jesus (1738, wooden, architectural monument of national importance),
- St. Michael church (1802, wooden, architectural monument of local importance),
- Ohliadiv Holy Trinity monastery.

== Notable people ==
- Osyp Turiansky (1880-1933), Ukrainian writer
- Yurii-Bohdan Shukhevych (1933–2022), Ukrainian far-right politician

== Sources ==
- "Ohladów, rus. Ohliadiw, wś, pow. kamioniecki". Geographical Dictionary of the Kingdom of Poland (in Polish). 7. Warszawa: Kasa im. Józefa Mianowskiego. 1886. p. 412.
- "Ohladów, r. 1515 Hohladów". Geographical Dictionary of the Kingdom of Poland (in Polish). p. 402.
