= Pavliv, Lviv Oblast =

Village in Lviv Oblast, Ukraine

Pavliv Павлів
- Village
- Location within Ukraine Location within Lviv Oblast
- Coordinates: 50°15′45″N 24°32′00″E
- Country: Ukraine
- Oblast: Lviv
- Raion: Radekhiv
- Area: 2.974 km^{2} (1.148 sq mi)
- Elevation: 224 m (735 ft)
- Population: 3,828
  - Density: 1,287/km^{2} (3,330/sq mi)

Pavliv (Ukrainian: Павлів, Polish: Pawłów) is a village (selo) in Chervonohrad Raion, Lviv Oblast, in western Ukraine. It belongs to Radekhiv urban hromada, one of the hromadas of Ukraine.

Until 18 July 2020, Pavliv belonged to Radekhiv Raion. The raion was abolished in July 2020 as part of the administrative reform of Ukraine, which reduced the number of raions of Lviv Oblast to seven. The area of Radekhiv Raion was merged into Chervonohrad Raion.
