= Korchyn, Sheptytskyi Raion, Lviv Oblast =

Village in Lviv Oblast, Ukraine

Korchyn Корчин
- Village
- Location within Lviv Oblast
- Coordinates: 50°20′20″N 24°23′47″E
- Country: Ukraine
- Oblast: Lviv Oblast
- District: Sheptytskyi Raion
- Hromada: Radekhiv urban hromada

Area
  - Total: 2.88 km^{2} (1.11 sq mi)
- Elevation: 208 m (682 ft)

Population (2001)
  - Total: 1,281
- Time zone: UTC+2 (EET)
  - Summer (DST): UTC+3 (EEST)
- Postal code: 80271
- Area code: +380 3255

Korchyn (Ukrainian: Ко́рчин) is a village (selo) in Sheptytskyi Raion, Lviv Oblast, in Western Ukraine. Korchyn belongs to Radekhiv urban hromada, one of the hromadas of Ukraine.

Until 18 July 2020, Korchyn belonged to Radekhiv Raion. The raion was abolished in July 2020 as part of the administrative reform of Ukraine, which reduced the number of raions Rivne Oblast to four. The area of Radekhiv Raion was merged into Sheptytskyi Raion, which was then known as Chervonohrad Raion.
