= Lopatyn =

Rural locality in Lviv Oblast, Ukraine

Lopatyn Лопатин
- Rural settlement
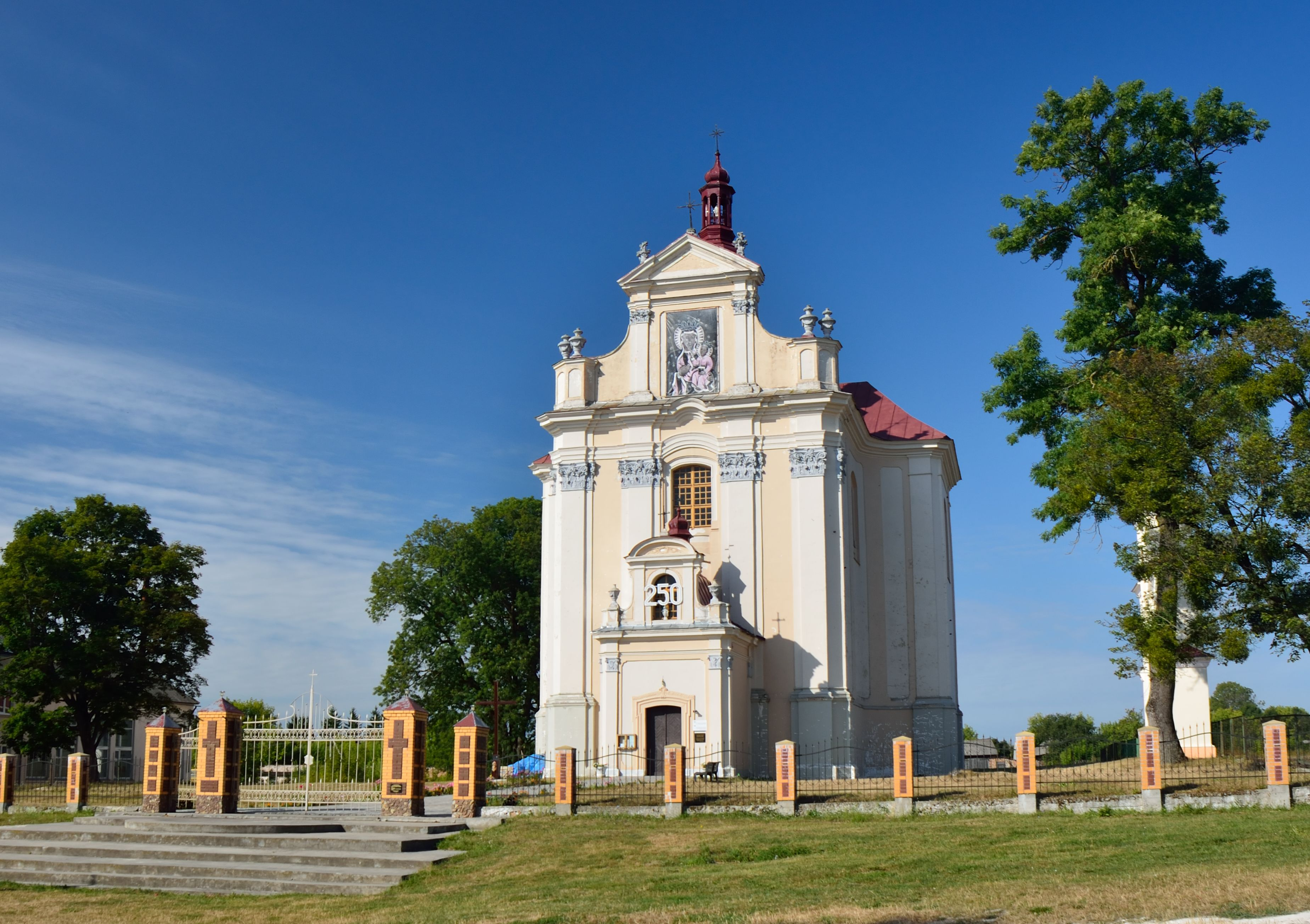
- Church of the Immaculate Conception of the Virgin Mary

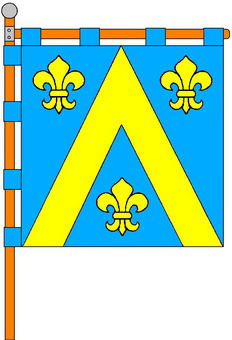
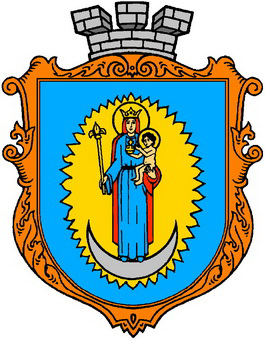
- Flag Coat of arms

- Location in Lviv Oblast Location in Ukraine
- Coordinates: 50°13′03″N 24°50′42″E
- Country: Ukraine
- Oblast: Lviv Oblast
- Raion: Sheptytskyi Raion
- Hromada: Lopatyn settlement hromada

Population (2022)
  - Total: 3,259
- Time zone: UTC+2 (EET)
  - Summer (DST): UTC+3 (EEST)

Lopatyn (Ukrainian: Лопатин, Polish: Łopatyn) is a rural settlement in Sheptytskyi Raion of Lviv Oblast in Ukraine. It is located on the left bank of the Ostrivka, a left tributary of the Styr in the drainage basin of the Dnieper. Lopatyn hosts the administration of Lopatyn settlement hromada, one of the hromadas of Ukraine. Population: 3,259 (2022 estimate).

== History ==
Until 18 July 2020, Lopatyn belonged to Radekhiv Raion. The raion was abolished in July 2020 as part of the administrative reform of Ukraine, which reduced the number of raions of Lviv Oblast to seven. The area of Radekhiv Raion was merged into Chervonohrad Raion (modern Sheptytskyi Raion).

Until 26 January 2024, Lopatyn was designated urban-type settlement. On this day, a new law entered into force which abolished this status, and Lopatyn became a rural settlement.

== Transportation ==
The closest railway station is in Radekhiv, about 15 kilometres (9.3 mi) west of Lopatyn.The settlement is connected by local roads with Radekhiv, Brody, Busk, and Berestechko, where it has further access via national roads to Lviv, Rivne, and Lutsk.

== Notable people ==
- Asher Barash
