= Shchurovychi =

Village in Lviv Oblast, Ukraine

- Village
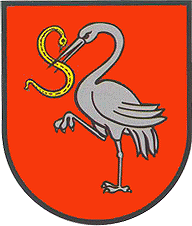
- Coat of arms

- Location within Lviv Oblast Location within Ukraine
- Coordinates: 50°16′03″N 25°01′18″E
- Country: Ukraine
- Oblast: Lviv
- Raion: Chervonohrad
- Area: 1.42 km^{2} (0.55 sq mi)
- Elevation: 194 m (636 ft)
- Population (2021): 433
  - Density: 340.85/km^{2} (882.8/sq mi)

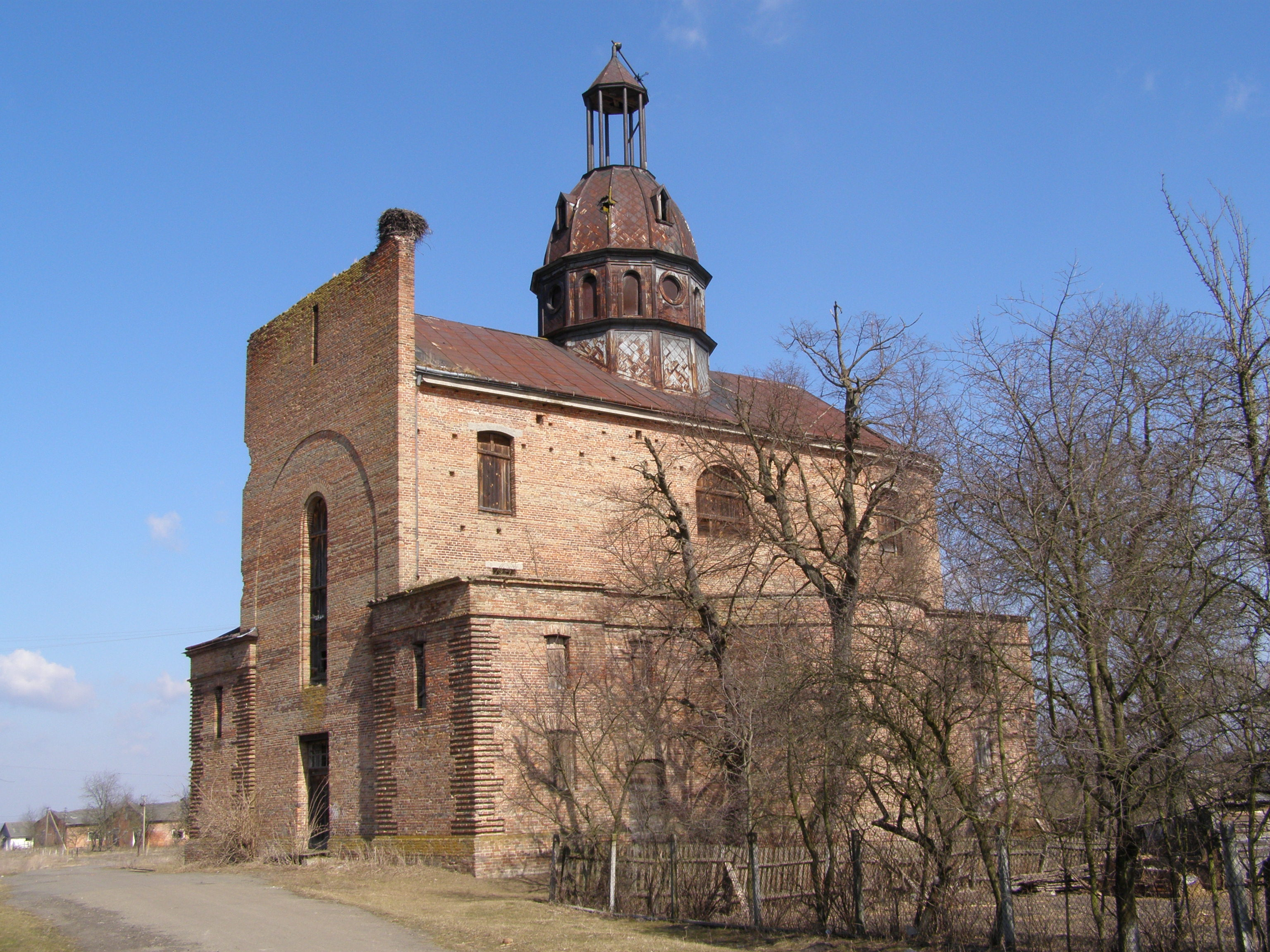
Photo of a Catholic church in the town of Shchurovychi

Shchurovychi (Ukrainian: Щуровичі; Russian: Щуровичи, romanized: Shchurovichi; Polish: Szczurowice, Yiddish: שטשערוויץ/שטערוויץ, romanized: Shtervits/Sh't'shervits; Hebrew: שטרוויץ/שצ'ורוביצה, romanized: Shch'urovitse/Shtruvits) is a village (selo) in Chervonohrad Raion, Lviv Oblast, in western Ukraine. It belongs to Lopatyn settlement hromada, one of the hromadas of Ukraine.

Until 18 July 2020, Shchurovychi belonged to Radekhiv Raion. The raion was abolished in July 2020 as part of the administrative reform of Ukraine, which reduced the number of raions of Lviv Oblast to seven. The area of Radekhiv Raion was merged into Chervonohrad Raion.
