= Turiansky =

Turiansky or Turyanskyi (Ukrainian: Турянський) is a surname. Notable people with the surname include:

- Serhiy Turyanskyi, Ukrainian football coach
- Osyp Turiansky (1880–1933), Ukrainian writer
