= Sembratovych =

Sembratovych (Ukrainian: Сембратович, Polish: Sembratowycz) is a family name in Ukrainian language. It may refer to:

- Joseph Sembratovych (1821–1900), was Primate of the Ukrainian Greek Catholic Church from 1870 to 1882.
- Roman Sembratovych (1875–1905), was a Ukrainian journalist and publicist.
- Sylvester Sembratovych (1836–1898), was Cardinal and Primate of the Ukrainian Greek Catholic Church from 1885 to 1898.
