= Osyp Turiansky =

Ukrainian writer (1880–1933)

- Осип Турянський
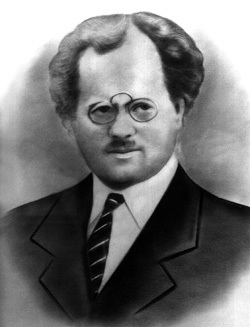
- Osyp Turiansky
- Born: 2 February 1880; Ohliadiv, Kingdom of Galicia and Lodomeria, Austria-Hungary
- Died: 28 March 1933 (aged 53); Lviv, Second Polish Republic (now Ukraine)
- Education: University of Vienna
- Occupations: writer, teacher, literary critic
- Writing career
- Pen name: Ivan Dumka
- Language: Ukrainian
- Period: 1908–1933
- Literary movement: Expressionism

Signature
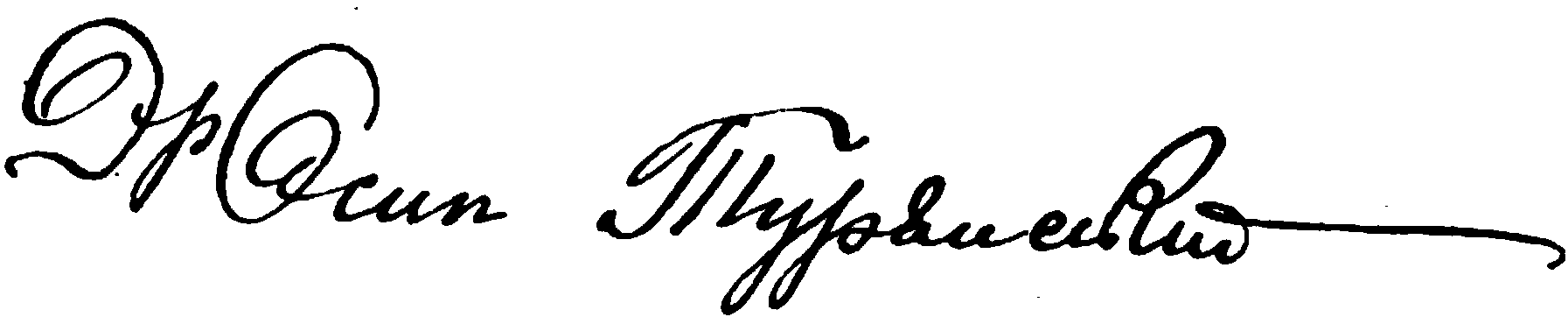

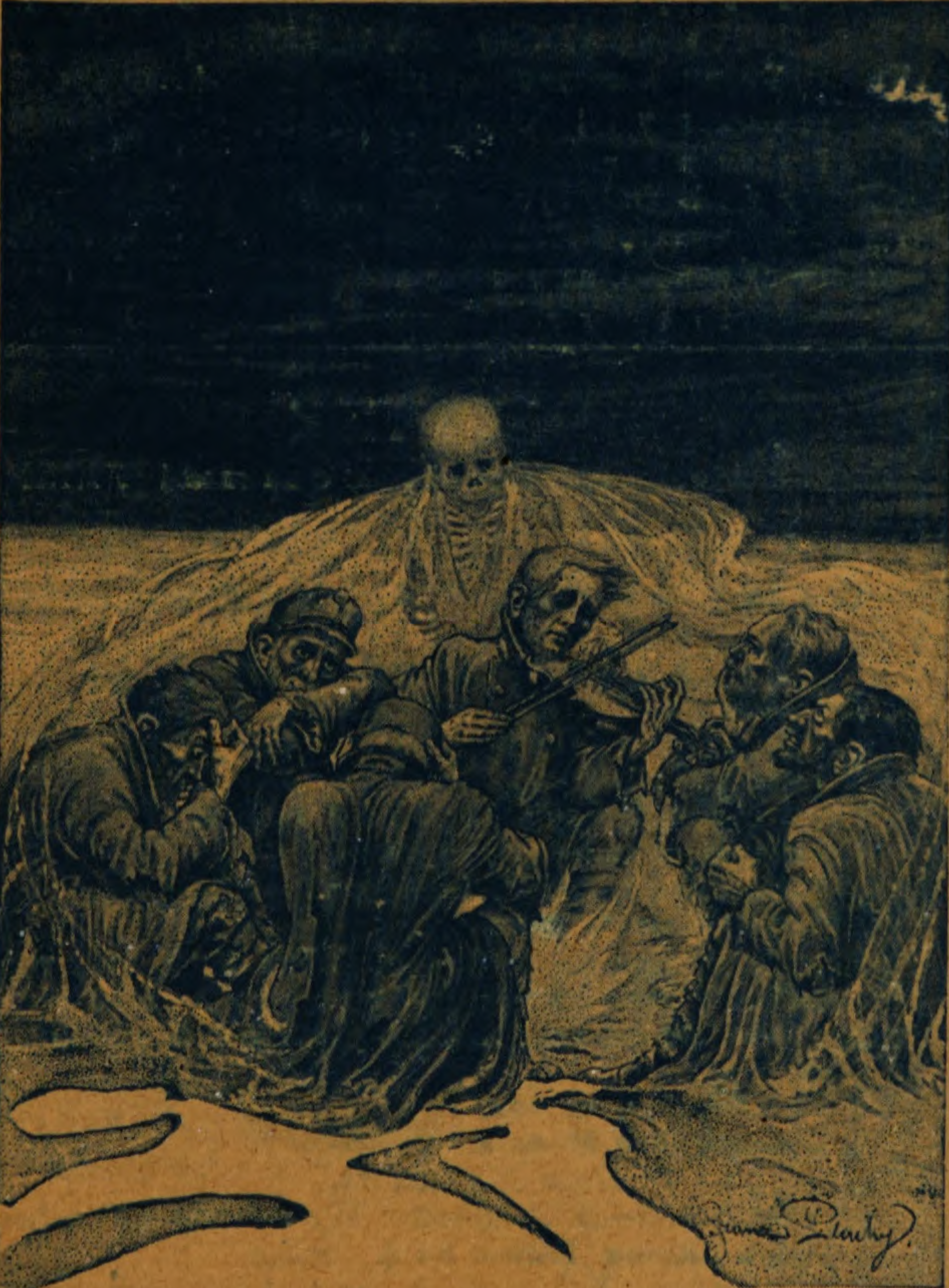
Cover illustration from the Ukrainian edition of Beyond the Limits of Pain, 1921

Osyp Turiansky (Ukrainian: Осип Турянський; 2 February 1880 – 28 March 1933) was a Ukrainian writer, teacher and literary critic. His most famous text is the psychological novel Beyond the Limits of Pain (Поза межами болю), known in the English translation as Lost Shadows, dedicated to his own experiences as a soldier during World War I. Turiansky also published a number of short stories, a comedy and several critical works.

== Biography ==
Turiansky was born in the village of Ohliadiv in Radekhiv district of Galicia. His father was illiterate, and Osyp was the only of his eight sons who could afford to get education. After graduating from the academic gymnasium of Lviv, he went to study at the philosophy department of Vienna University, from which he graduated with a doctoral degree in 1907. Turiansky's literary debut took place in 1908, when he published a series of novellas in the almanac of Vienna's Sich association. In 1908–1909 he edited the monthly Ukrainische Rundschau. Afterwards he worked as a teacher in Przemyśl, Poland.

After the start of World War I Turiansky was mobilized into the Austro-Hungarian Army. In winter of 1915 he was taken prisoner by Serbian troops. Turiansky was one of the 15,000 surviving prisoners of war from a total number of 60,000 captured Austro-Hungarians who were forced to march across the Albanian mountains in harsh winter conditions. Following the ordeal, he ended up in Elba, where in 1917 he finished the work on his most famous novel. After the end of the war Turiansky left Italy and returned to Austria, where he resumed his work as a lecturer. In 1921 his novel Beyond the Limits of Pain was published in Vienna. Influenced by the Expressionist tradition, it was praised as one of Europe's most remarkable anti-war novels by German and Austrian critics. A German translation of the work saw the light in the same year.

In 1923 Turiansky returned to Galicia, which was now ruled by Poland. There he published a number of pamphlets, which failed to achieve popularity. Turiansky's literary works were largely ignored in the Galician society, and his critical views on politics and social order were met with condemnation, particularly in nationalist circles. After serving as a director of gymnasiums in Yavoriv and Drohobych, Turiansky was forced to quit his position in 1927 and later worked as a teacher at a Polish gymnasium in Lviv. In the late 1920s he was a contributor for the left-wing journal Novi Shliakhy ("New Ways"), published in Lviv. In 1933 he published a short story How People Accepted Christ (Як люди приймали Христа) under the pseudonym Ivan Dumka. Turiansky died on 28 March 1933 in Lviv.

== Legacy ==
The English translation of Beyond the Limits of Pain was published under the title Lost Shadows in 1935 in New York. It was claimed at the time to be the first Ukrainian work of fiction in America to be published in English translation. In Soviet Ukraine Turiansky's literary works were long suppressed. The first edition of his prose to be published after World War II was issued in 1989 in Kyiv.

== Views ==
Turiansky denied the ideas of "purification through sin" and "universal love", which had been popularized by Dostoyevsky. He considered human egoism and cruelty to be the main causes of social problems such as war and famine. According to him, love in respect to people who have consciously committed sin is impossible, because, being slaves of their own passions, such people are only capable of multiplying the suffering.

== Works ==
- Beyond the Limits of Pain (Поза межа межами болю, 1921), published in English translation as Lost Shadows (1935)
- Duma of the Primeval Forest (Дума пралісу, 1922) – novelette
- The Struggle for Greatness (Боротьба за великість, 1926) – collection of stories
- Slaves (Раби, 1927) – satirical comedy
- Son of the Soil (Син землі, 1933) – novel
