= Battle of Chołojów =

- Part of the Polish–Soviet War
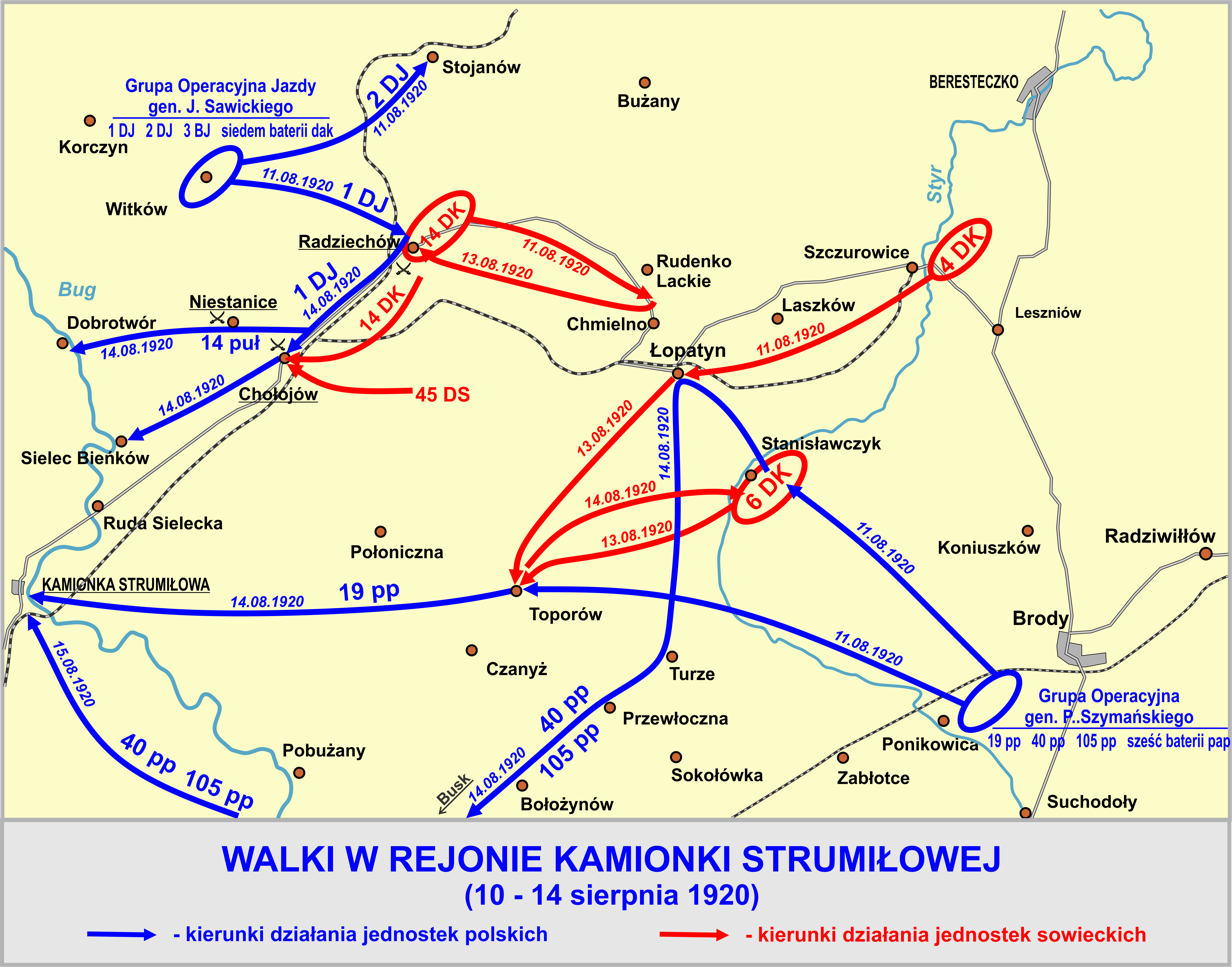
- Map of the fight in the redion in 10–14 August 1920
| Date | 14 August 1920 |
| Location | Near Chołojów (currently Vuzlove, Ukraine) 50°14′N 24°33′E |
| Result | Retreat of Polish forces |

Belligerents
| Poland | (Russian Soviet Federative Socialist Republic) Russian SFSR |

Commanders and leaders
| (Second Polish Republic) Juliusz Rómmel | (Russian Soviet Federative Socialist Republic) Iona Yakir (Russian Soviet Federative Socialist Republic) Alexander Parkhomenko |

Units involved
| (Second Polish Republic) 1st Cavalry Division | (Russian Soviet Federative Socialist Republic) 45th Rifle Division (Russian Soviet Federative Socialist Republic) 14th Cavalry Division |

Casualties and losses
| 216 dead or wounded | Unknown |

Battle of Chołojów was a battle during the Polish–Soviet War fought on 14 August 1920, on the Southwestern Front, between Second Polish Republic and Russian SFSR. Polish forces consisted of the 1st Cavalry Division commanded by Juliusz Rómmel, while Russian consisted of the 45th Rifle Division commanded by Iona Yakir and the 14th Cavalry Division commanded by Alexander Parkhomenko. The battle was fought in the area around the village of Chołojów (currently Vuzlove, Ukraine).

The goal of Polish forces was to stall the Russian forces and give infantry time to prepare for the defense on the Bug river. Eventually, the 1st Cavalry Division had retreated and the area had fallen into Russian control.

== Bibliography ==
- Samhorodek – Komarów 1920. Walki jazdy polskiej z konnicą Budionnego, maj – wrzesień 1920 by Włodzimierz Nowak, Warsaw, Bellona SA, 2010. ISBN 978-83-11-11897-3.
- Leksykon wojny polsko–rosyjskiej 1919 – 1920 by Janusz Odziemkowski, Warsaw, Oficyna Wydawnicza „Rytm”, 2004. ISBN 83-7399-096-8.
- Kampania ukraińska 1920 roku by Lech Wyszczelski, Warsaw, Wydawnictwo Neriton, 2009. ISBN 978-83-7543-066-0.
- Wojna o polskie kresy 1918–1921 by Lech Wyszczelski:, Warszawa, Wydawnictwo Bellona SA, 2011. ISBN 978-83-11-12866-8.
