= Yulian Butsmaniuk =

Ukrainian and Canadian artist and monumentalist (1885–1967)

- Юліан Лукич Буцманюк
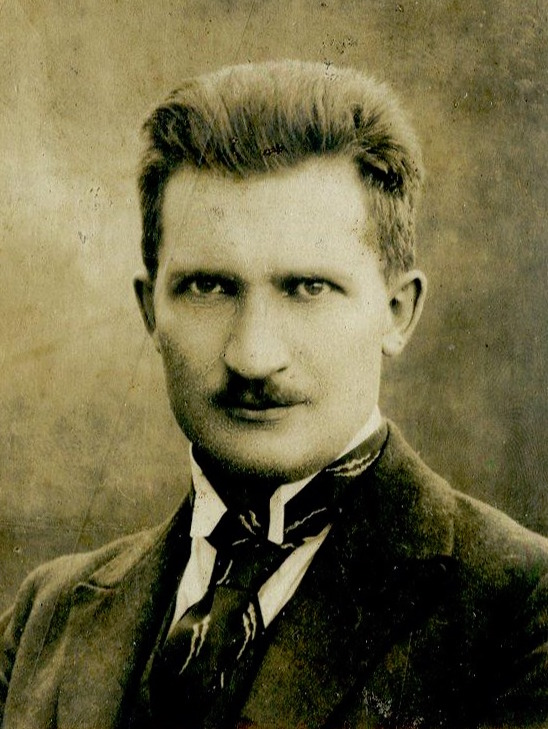
- Born: 3 July 1885; Smorzhiv, Austria-Hungary (now Ukraine)
- Died: 30 December 1967 (aged 82); Edmonton, Canada
- Education: Kraków Academy of Arts, Prague Academy of Arts
- Occupations: Artist and monumentalist

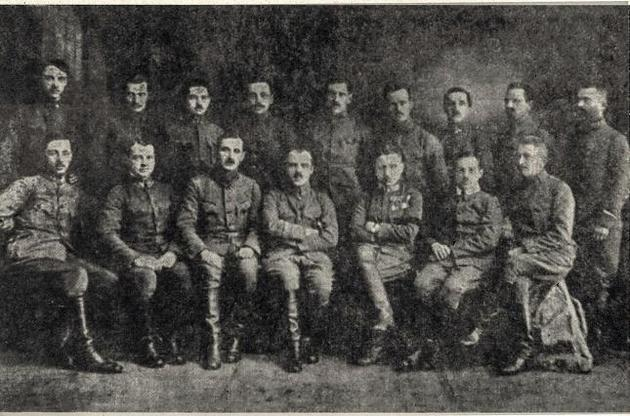
State Secretariat of Military Affairs of the ZUNR, February 1919. Seated from left to right: Volodymyr Bemko, Orest Pidlishetskyi, Petro Bubela, Dmytro Vitovskyi, Rostyslav-Edmund Bilas, Nykyfor Hirniak, and Roman Shypailo. Standing from left to right: Nestor Hamorak, Yulian Butsmaniuk, Teodor Syvak, Hryts Herasymovych, Ostap Borodievych, Semen Mahalas, Volodymyr Tymtsiurak, Vasyl Panchak, Ivan Boberskyi

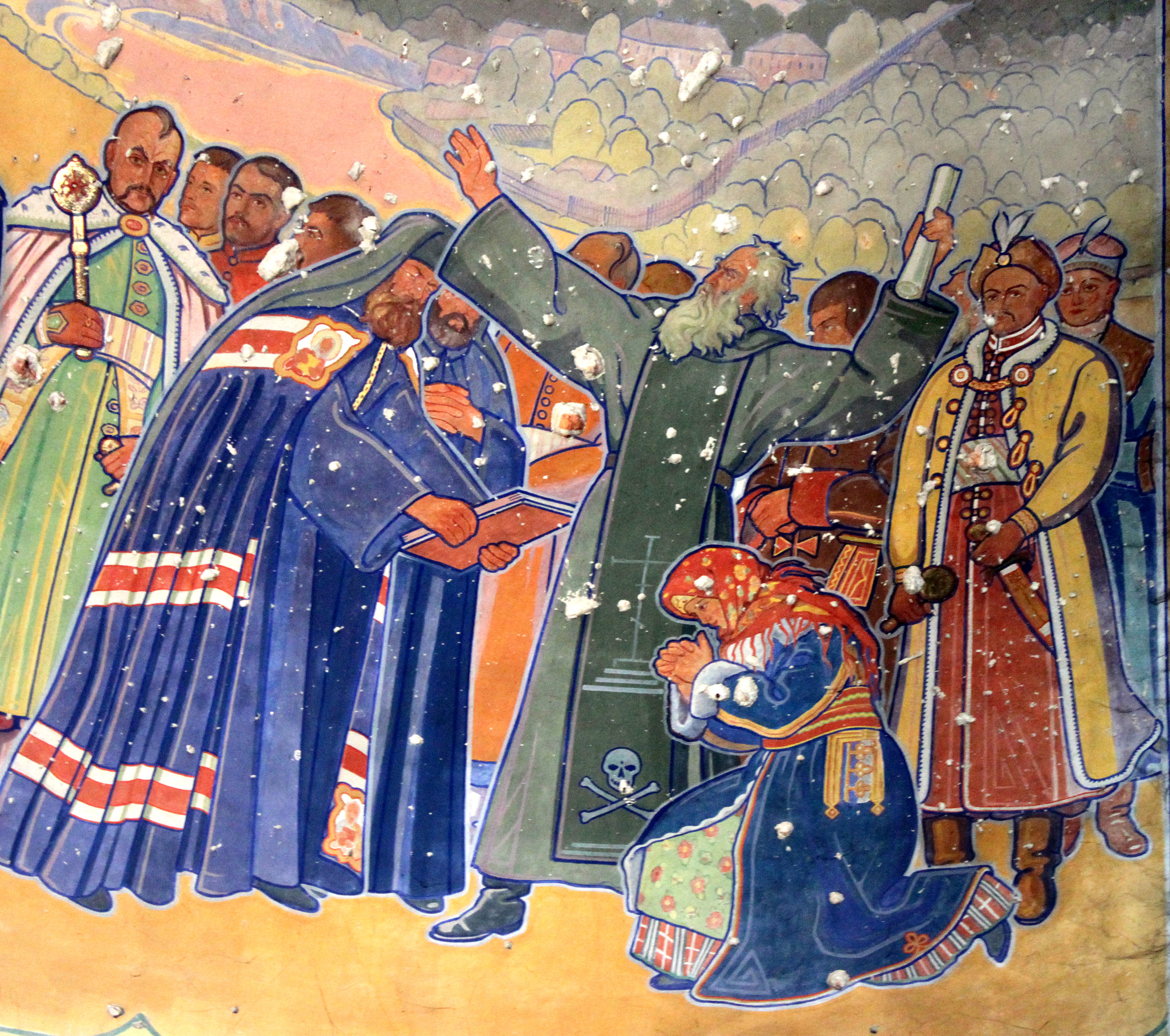
Y. Butsmaniuk. B. Khmelnytsky, I. Vyshenskyi, I. Mazepa, H. Hulevychivna, and other prominent Orthodox Christians of Ukraine. Sermon by Ivan Vyshenskyi (painting from the Monastery of the Nativity in Zhovkva)

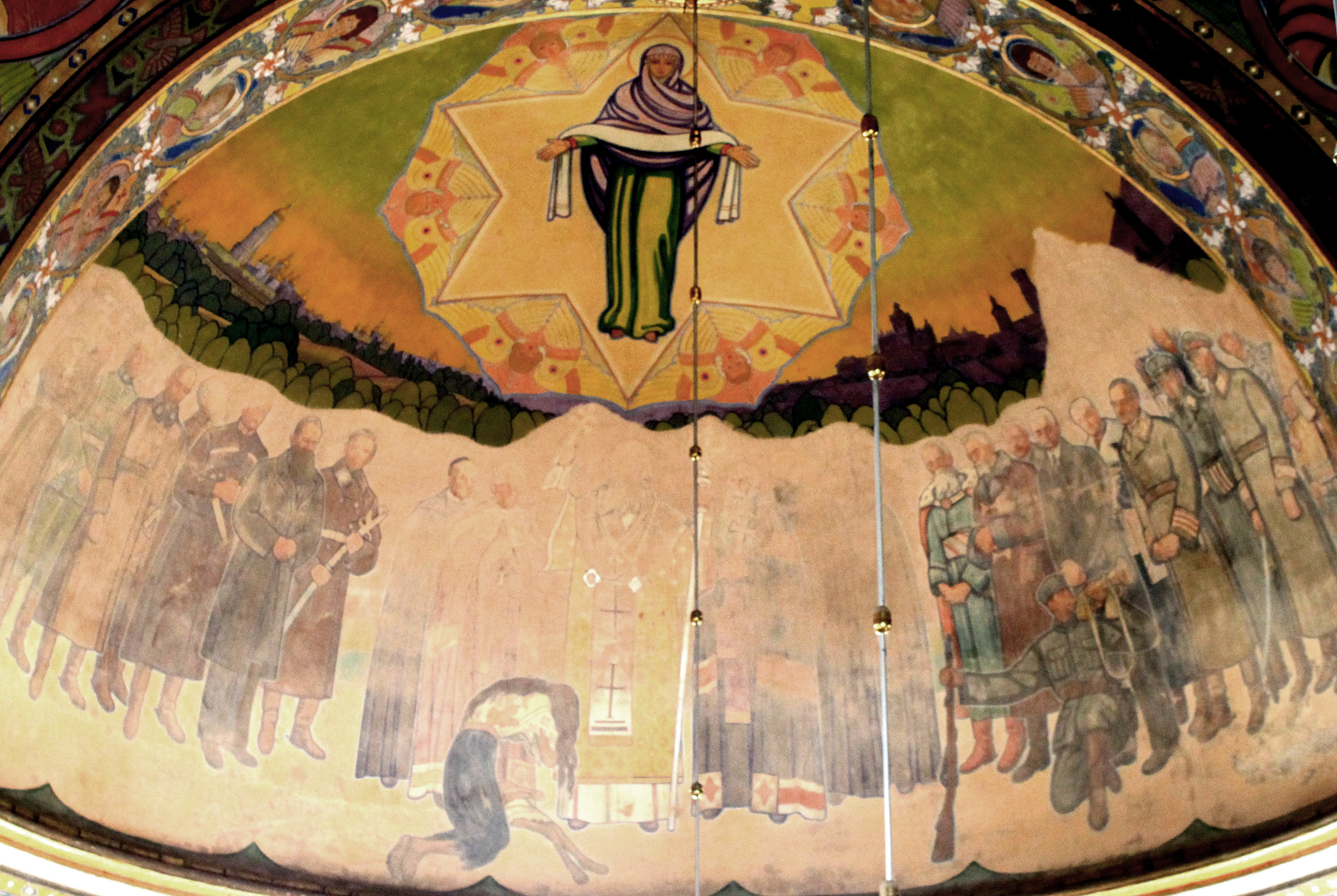
A fragment of paintings in the chapel of the Church of the Heart of Christ

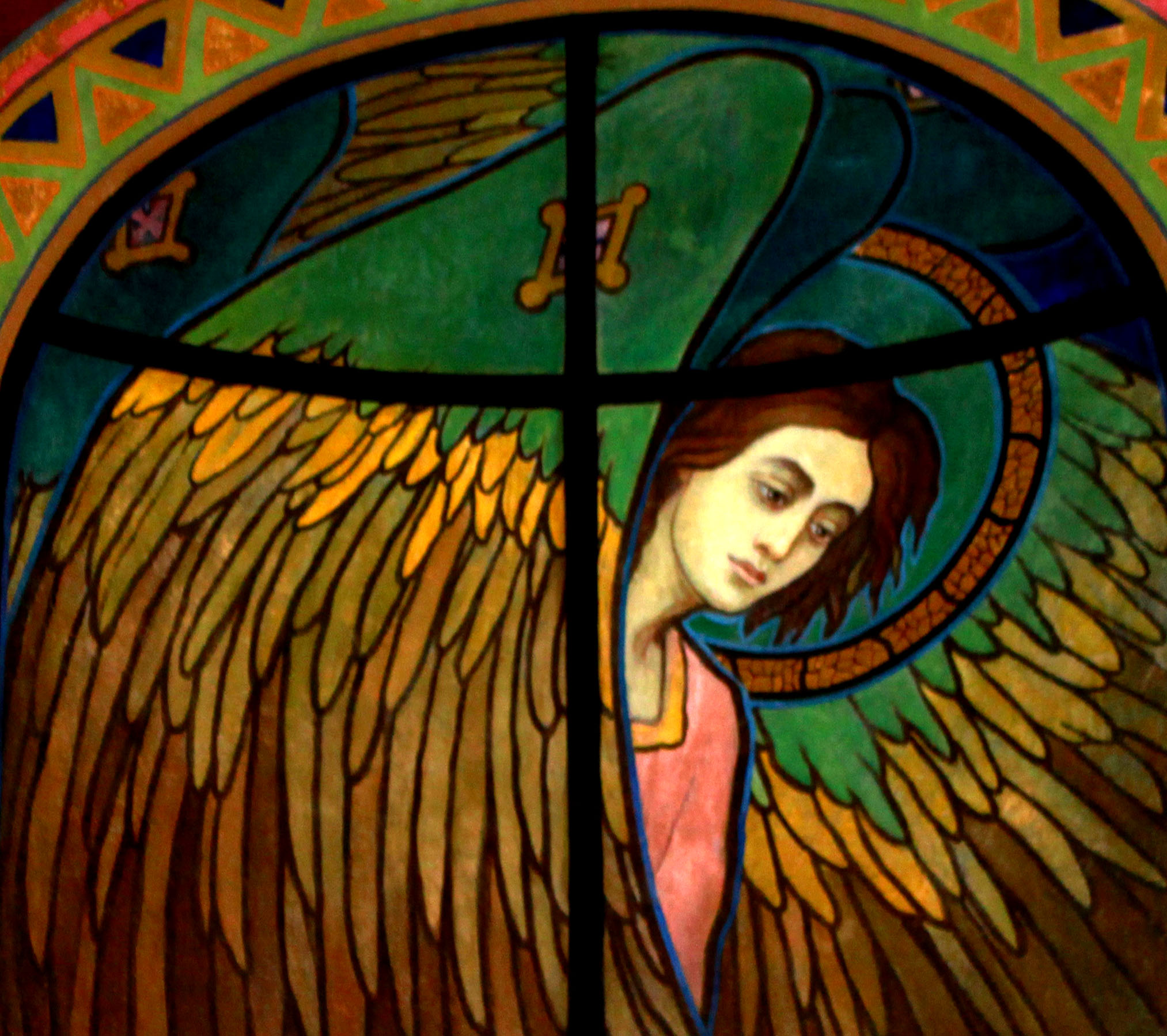
A fragment of paintings in the chapel of the Church of the Heart of Christ

Yulian Butsmaniuk (Ukrainian: Юліан Лукич Буцманюк; 3 July 1885 – 30 December 1967) was a Ukrainian and Canadian artist and monumentalist, a student of Modest Sosenko.

== Biography ==
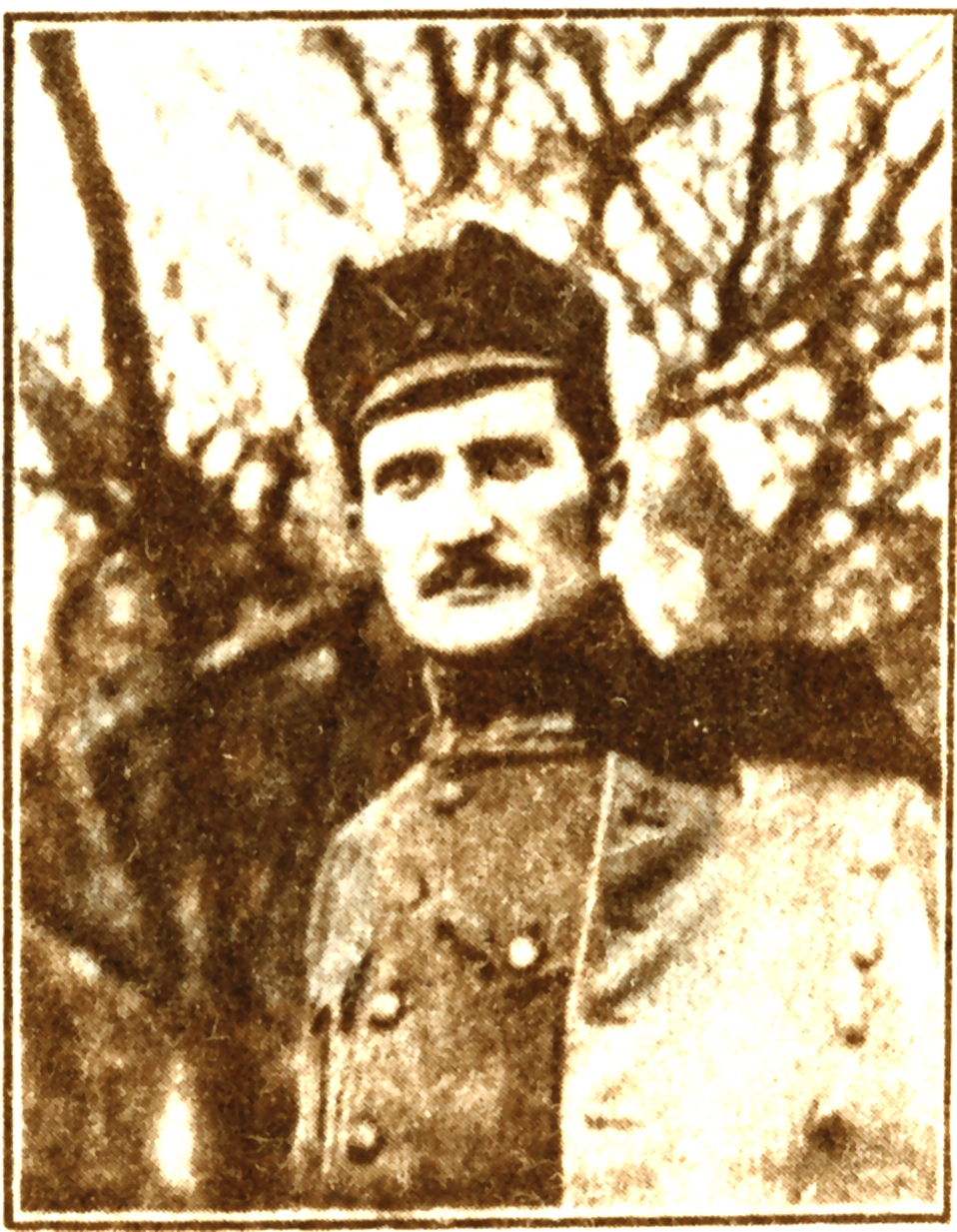
During his service in the Ukrainian Sich Riflemen

He was born in the village of Smorzhiv in the Lviv Oblast to a village teacher. His father died when Yulian was 1 year old. His mother and son moved to Lviv. He studied at a gymnasium and attended a professional school with an artistic inclination at the Lviv Industrial Museum. Soon his mother died, and the boy had to earn his own living. After mastering the painting technique, Yulian was invited to work on serious orders by his teacher Tadeusz Rybkowski. This work became a good school for the young artist, marking the beginning of Butsmaniuk's professional development as a monumentalist.

In 1906, he met Modest Sosenko and together with him began working on the mural of the church in the village of Koniukhy in Berezhany region. In the course of their collaboration, Modest Sosenko highly appreciated the talent of the novice painter and later facilitated his entry into the Kraków Academy of Arts. Together, the artists completed several more works, in particular, in Slavsko and Rykiv. All the works in Galician churches at that time were carried out under the patronage and supervision of Metropolitan Andrei Sheptytskyi. The Metropolitan liked Butsmaniuk's works, they met, and the Metropolitan took care of the young artist. With the moral and partially financial support of Metropolitan Andrei, Yulian studied at one of the most prestigious art institutions in Central Europe, the Kraków Academy of Arts (1908–1914).

He took part in the restoration of Church of the Assumption of the Blessed Virgin Mary in Kraków (1912), performing mural and stained glass work. For several years he worked for the famous Polish stained-glass company of Stanisław Gabriel Żeleński. He also visited Italy with the support of the Metropolitan. After successfully completing his studies, he received a scholarship from the Austrian government to continue his studies abroad.

At the outbreak of the World War I in 1914, he enlisted in the Legion of Ukrainian Sich Riflemen, became one of the active contributors to the Press Quarter, a photojournalist, and one of those who opened a great page in the history of the Ukrainian Army of the early twentieth century. In December 1914, Butsmaniuk's first photographs dedicated to the military glory of the Legion of Ukrainian Sich Riflemen were published, and the following year his frontline paintings were combined into a series of postcards. Butsmaniuk was the chief designer of the legion's symbols and insignia. Later he fought in the Ukrainian Galician Army (until 1919). He was wounded several times. Ranks: hauptmann of the Ukrainian Sich Riflemen, ataman of the Ukrainian People's Army. In 1920–1923 he was in internment camps in Czechoslovakia. After the liquidation of the camps, he continued his studies at the Prague Academy of Arts and in 1927 returned to Lviv. He married Iryna Chaikivska. In 1922, his son Bohdan was born.

From 1923 to 1927, he studied at the Prague Academy of Arts.

From 1927, he taught drawing in Lviv at the Ridna Shkola Society. In 1932, he began painting churches again. He emigrated to Kraków, where he worked as an editor of the Ukrainian Publishing House in 1941–1944. Later he moved to Vienna and Munich, and in 1950 to Canada. He painted the walls of St. Josaphat Cathedral in Edmonton, where the murals on the walls have a national character. He participated in various exhibitions of fine art.

== Awards ==
- Military Cross of the Ukrainian People's Republic (posthumously, 21 March 1978).

== Creative heritage ==
The artist's most famous works are paintings in the Ukrainian Art Nouveau style:

- wall paintings in the reading room of the Scientific Library of the Ivan Franko National University of Lviv at 5 Drahomanova Street, made in 1904 together with Tadeush Rybkovskyi and Yulian Makarevych;
- in the church of the Basilian monastery in Zhovkva (now the Monastery of the Nativity and the Church of the Sacred Heart), executed in 1910-1911 and 1931-1939,
- in the Church of the Assumption in Slavsko, Boikivshchyna, made together with Modest Sosenko in 1910.
- interior paintings of the Ukrainian Cathedral of St. Josaphat in Edmonton (1957–1967).

Butsmaniuk's works were kept in the Lviv museum created by Andrei Sheptytskyi. However, in 1952, by order of the Soviet authorities, they were burned in the museum's courtyard along with a thousand other works by Ukrainian artists.

== Bibliography ==
- Butsmaniuk Yulian / K. Ye. Naumenko // Encyclopedia of Modern Ukraine [Online] / Eds. : I. М. Dziuba, A. I. Zhukovsky, M. H. Zhelezniak [et al.] ; National Academy of Sciences of Ukraine, Shevchenko Scientific Society. – Kyiv : The NASU institute of Encyclopedic Research, 2004.
- Гах І. Сторінки історії галицького церковного стінопису першої половини XX ст. До 130-річчя з дня народження Модеста Сосенка та 120-річчя з дня народження Юліана Буцманюка // Українське мистецтво Львова 1919—1939. — Львів, Галицька брама. № 1-3 (121—123) січень-березень 2005. — С. 19-20.
- Бірюльов Ю. О. Мистецтво львівської сецесії. — Львів: Центр Європи, 2005. — 184 с. — ISBN 978-966-7022-44-7.
- Юліан Буцманюк Стінопис Жовківської церкви Христа-Чоловіколюбця / Автори-упорядники І. Гах, О. Сидор. — Львів: Місіонер, 2006.
- Саварин П. З собою взяли Україну. Від Тернопілля до Альберти. — Київ: КВІЦ, 2007. — 524 с. — ISBN 977-966-8550-62-1.
