= Yurii Shukhevych =

Ukrainian politician and independence activist (1933–2022)

Hero of Ukraine Yurii Shukhevych
- Юрій Шухевич
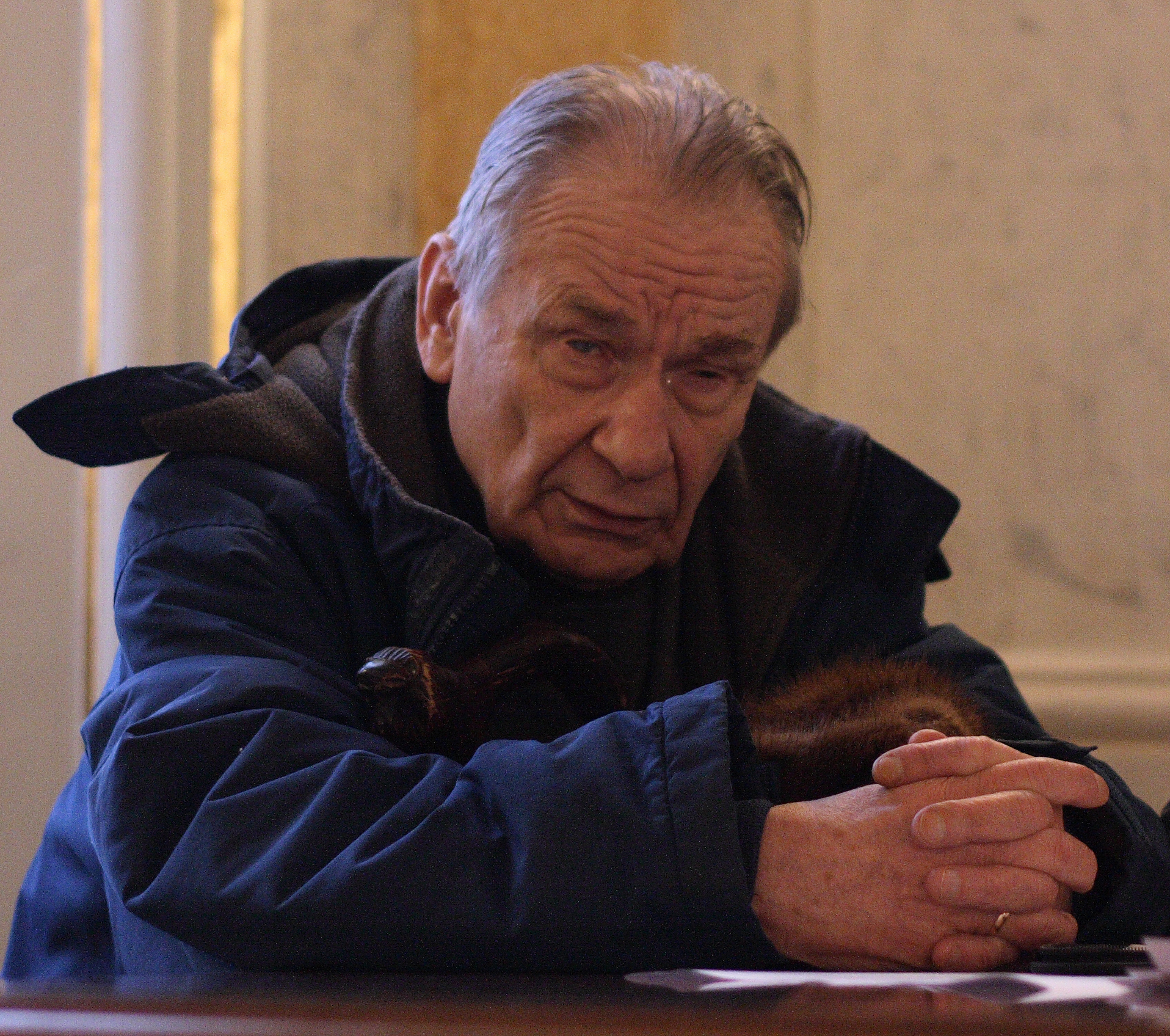
- Shukhevych in 2010

Head of Ukrainian National Assembly – Ukrainian National Self Defence
- In office December 1990 – August 1994
- In office October 2006 – October 2014

People's Deputy of Ukraine

8th convocation
- In office 27 November 2014 – 29 July 2019
- Constituency: Radical Party, No.5

Personal details
- Born: 28 March 1933 Ohladów, Poland (now Ukraine)
- Died: 22 November 2022 (aged 89) Munich, Germany
- Resting place: Lychakiv Cemetery, Lviv
- Party: Radical Party
- Other political affiliations: Ukrainian National Assembly – Ukrainian National Self Defence (December 1990 till October 2014)
- Awards: Order of the State

Yurii-Bohdan Romanovych Shukhevych (Ukrainian: Юрій-Богдан Романович Шухевич, 28 March 1933 – 22 November 2022) was a Ukrainian far-right politician. Son of the Ukrainian Insurgent Army commander Roman Shukhevych, Yurii was separated from his family at the age of 12 due to being a son of an "enemy of the people" and spent over 30 years in Soviet prisons. A member of the Ukrainian Helsinki Group, he was a long-serving leader of the Ukrainian National Assembly – Ukrainian National Self Defence. In the 2014 Ukrainian parliamentary election Shukhevych was elected into the Ukrainian parliament for Radical Party.

== Early life and imprisonment ==
Yurii Shukhevych was born on 28 March 1933, in the town of Ohladów, Lwów Voivodeship, Poland (now Ohliadiv, Lviv Oblast of Ukraine). He was the son of Roman Shukhevych, the leader of the Ukrainian Insurgent Army. He received one of his names in memory of his maternal uncle Yurko (Yurii) Berezynskyi, who had been a member of OUN and died in 1932 during a raid against a Polish post office in Horodok. In 1946, when Western Ukraine was occupied by the Red Army, he was arrested with his mother and grandmother, who were later imprisoned. Shukhevych himself ended up in an orphanage for children of enemies of the people in Donets Basin. He ran away home twice, meeting his father, who remained in the underground in Lviv, but later was taken back again.

In 1948, at the age of 15, Shukhevych was accused of being a member of the OUN-UPA, the nationalist underground organization that his father commanded. After he turned 16, in 1949, he was sentenced to 10 years in the Vladimir Central Prison. When his father was killed in action, in 1950, Yuri, now aged 17, was taken from Vladimir prison to Lviv to identify the corpse. He was released under an amnesty in 1954, after the death of Joseph Stalin, but the USSR Procurator General ordered that he be sent back to prison to complete his sentence. On the day of his release, in 1958, he was rearrested, charged with having conducted "anti-Soviet agitation" in prison, and sentenced to another ten years, in a labor camp in Mordovia.

After his release in August 1968, he was forbidden to live in Ukraine. He settled in Nalchik, in the North Caucasus, married, had two children, worked as an electrician, and wrote an account of his 20 years in prison. In February 1972, he was arrested in Nalchik after anti-Soviet literature was discovered during a police raid on his rooms and handed over to the KGB in Kyiv, then sent back to Nalchik, and sentenced to another nine years in labor camps, followed by five in exile. In 1973, he wrote a letter to the UN from a labor camp in Mordovia, for which another year was added to his sentence. He was held in Vladimir Prison, then transferred to the Tatar prison. During his time as a prisoner, Shukhevych went blind.

During his exile, Shukhevych became a member of the Ukrainian Helsinki Union. After he had completed his prison sentence, in 1983, he was exiled to Siberia, and kept in a nursing home in Tomsk. He was allowed to return to his native Lviv in 1988, at the age of 55, after 44 years of absence.

== Political career ==
In December 1990 Shukhevych was elected as head of far-right paramilitary organization Ukrainian National Assembly which itself was renamed Ukrainian National Assembly – Ukrainian National Self Defence (UNA-UNSO) in September 1991.

Shukhevych failed to register as a candidate in the 1991 Ukrainian presidential election because of a failure to collect 100,000 signatures.

In the 1994 Ukrainian parliamentary election Shukhevych failed to win after receiving no more than 7.44% of the votes in single-member districts in Zolochiv.

In August 1994 Shukhevych retired from active political life because of health problems and relationships with other leaders of the party had finally deteriorated.

Early 2006 Shukhevych returned to politics and entered in the electoral list of the UNA-UNSO for the March 2006 Ukrainian parliamentary election at number 1. The party, however, lost the election and gained no more than 0.06% of the total votes. The party did not participate in the 2007 elections.

On 19 August 2006, Shukhevych was awarded the title Hero of Ukraine "for civil courage, long-term social, political and human rights activities in the name of independence of Ukraine".

In October 2006 UNA-UNSO re-elected Shukhevych as its chairman. And again did so in June 2010.

In February 2014 Shukhevych signed a petition that asked to respect the Russian language and Russian-speaking citizens of Ukraine lifestyle "so they do not feel like strangers in Ukraine".

In October 2014 Shukhevych was removed from his post as UNA-UNSO chairman due to the fact that he had agreed to run for the parliamentary elections for Radical Party of Oleh Liashko. In the 2014 Ukrainian parliamentary election Shukhevych as a candidate (placed 5th on the party list) of Radical Party was elected into the Ukrainian parliament.

As a deputy, Shukhevych issued a petition to the president, demanding to declassify the information on pensions received by former members of party nomenklatura, secretaries of the Central Committee, Politburo and representatives of Soviet police organs. In 2015 he was instrumental in the drafting and passing of the Ukrainian decommunization laws.

He died in the night of 21 to 22 November 2022 in Munich, where he was undergoing medical treatment.

== Family ==
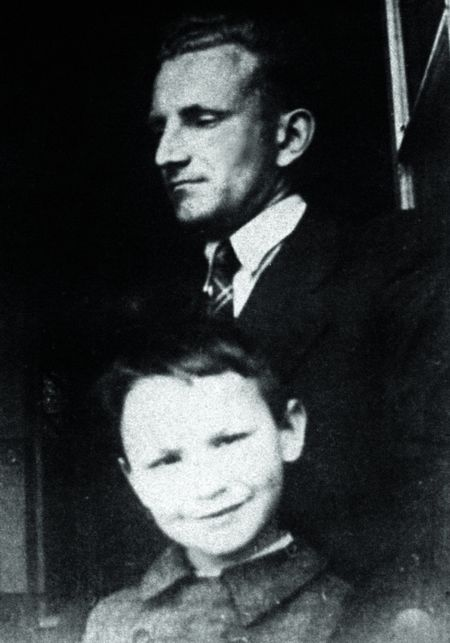
Yuri Shukhevych with his father Roman Shukhevych, 1940

Following the beginning of German-Soviet War, Yurii lived with his mother, sister and grandmother. He met his father only several times, asking for permission to enter the insurgent force, but Roman Shukhevych denied his appeal, not wishing to sacrifice the lives of the younger generation.

Yurii's mother Natalia was arrested in 1946 and sentenced to 10 years of prison camps. After her liberation from imprisonment in 1956, she returned to Lviv, but was unable to find a home due to the lack of official registration, which led to another arrest. In 1958 she was finally able to settle in Lviv. During her second arrest, Natalia met her daughter Marusia, who had been also put into an orphanage and came to visit her in prison. Natalia spent the rest of her life in Lviv, dying in 2002.

During his exile, Shukhevych married, and in 1970 his wife Lesia gave birth to son Roman (died in 2002). Lesia also had a son from her previous marriage called Yurii.

== See also ==
- Mykhailo Soroka, another member of the OUN, who spent over 30 years in imprisonment.
