= Roman Sembratovych =

Ukrainian journalist and publicist

Roman Sembratovych Роман Сембратович
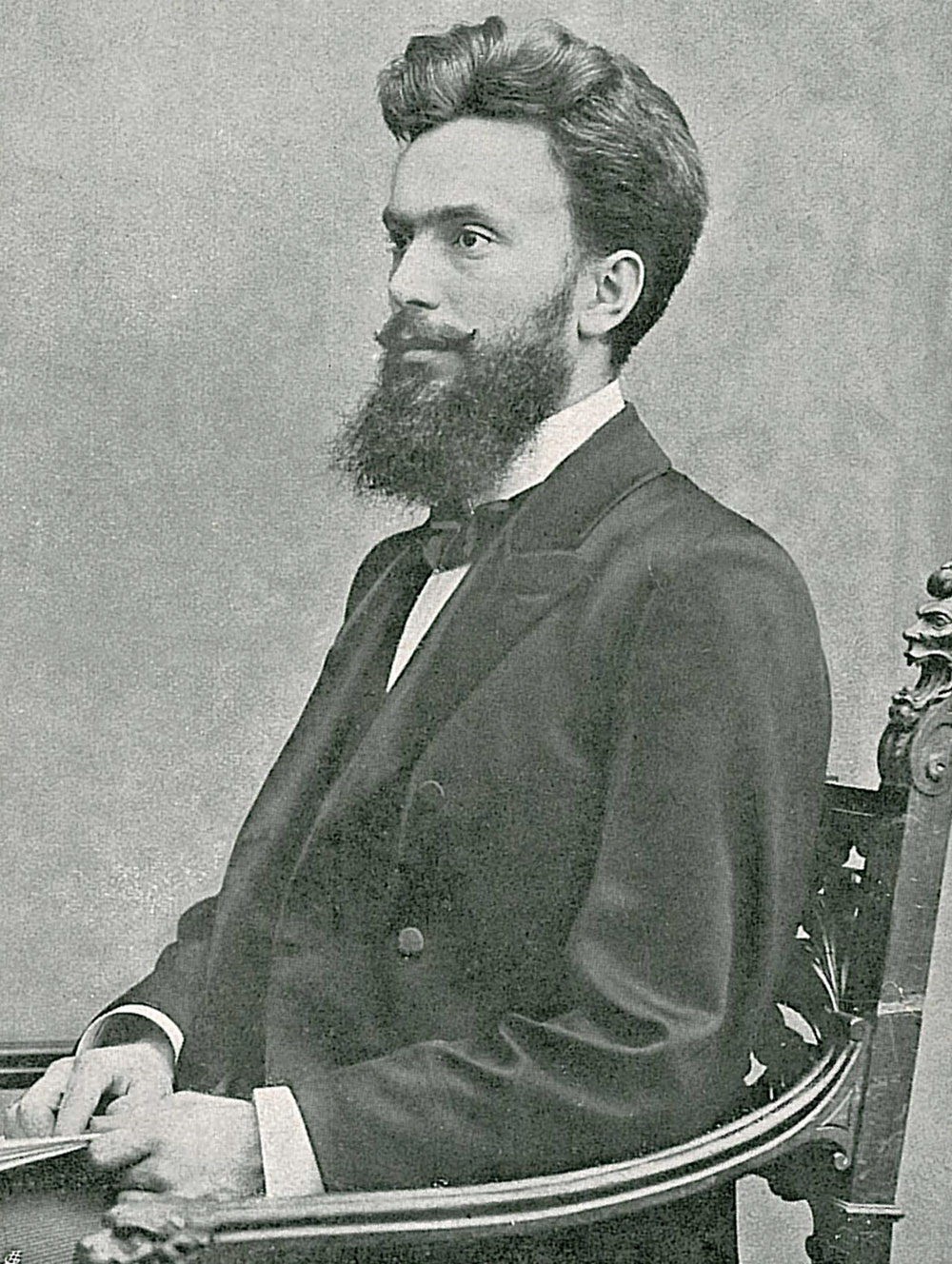
- Born: July 6, 1875; Monastyrtsi, Galicia, Austria-Hungary (now Poland)
- Died: January 8, 1906 (aged 30); Vienna, Austria-Hungary
- Occupation: Journalist
- Notable credit(s): Ruthenische Revue; 1903–1905

Roman Sembratovych (Ukrainian: Роман Сембратович, Polish: Roman Sembratowycz; July 6, 1875 – January 8, 1906) was a Ukrainian journalist and publicist.

He was born in Monastyrtsi, Lisko Powiat, Kingdom of Galicia and Lodomeria, Austria-Hungary (in present Poland). While a student in Vienna he became active in different Ukrainian societies such as the student society Sich. He published articles about the situation for the Ukrainian nation in several newspapers such as Frankfurter Zeitung.

In 1901 he was the editor of the German-language periodical X-Strahlen and 1903–1905 he was the main editor of the new journal Ruthenische Revue. It was a German-language periodical published by Ruthenische Nationalkomitee in Vienna. Through this journal, he tried to make the Ukrainian issue known among the European politicians and public. Several articles in Ruthenische Revue about the oppressed Ukrainian nation were published or quoted in different European newspapers. Sembratovych also tried to get into personal contact with liberal politicians to gain support for the Ukrainian cause. One of these politicians was the Swedish liberal politician Adolf Hedin who also wrote about the situation for Ukrainians in the Swedish newspapers Aftonbladet and Dagens Nyheter in 1904.

Sembratovych published two books (both in German): Polonia irredenta (Frankfurt am Main, 1903) and Das Zarentum im Kampfe mit der Zivilisation (Neuer Frankfurter Verlag, 1905). Le Tsarisme et L'Ukraïne (Paris, 1907) was published posthumously with a preface by the Norwegian writer Bjørnstjerne Bjørnson.
