= Korchyn, Rivne Oblast =

Village in Rivne Oblast, Ukraine

Korchyn Корчин
- Village
- Location within Rivne Oblast
- Coordinates: 50°52′57″N 26°11′51″E
- Country: Ukraine
- Oblast: Rivne Oblast
- District: Rivne Raion
- Hromada: Holovyn rural hromada

Area
  - Total: 0.69 km^{2} (0.27 sq mi)
- Elevation: 172 m (564 ft)

Population (2001)
  - Total: 359
- Time zone: UTC+2 (EET)
  - Summer (DST): UTC+3 (EEST)
- Postal code: 35051
- Area code: +380 3657

Korchyn (Ukrainian: Ко́рчин) is a village (selo) in Rivne Raion, Rivne Oblast, in Western Ukraine. Korchyn belongs to Holovyn rural hromada, one of the hromadas of Ukraine.

Until 18 July 2020, Korchyn belonged to Kostopil Raion. The raion was abolished in July 2020 as part of the administrative reform of Ukraine, which reduced the number of raions of Rivne Oblast to four. The area of Kostopil Raion was merged into Rivne Raion.
