= Lopatyn settlement hromada =

Hromada in Lviv Oblast, Ukraine

Lopatyn settlement hromada Лопатинська селищна громада
- Hromada
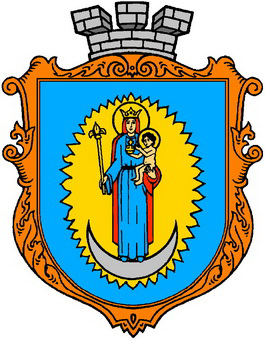
- Seal
- Interactive map of Lopatyn settlement hromada
- Country: Ukraine
- Oblast: Lviv Oblast
- Raion: Sheptytskyi Raion
- Admin. center: Lopatyn

Area
  - Total: 3,777 km^{2} (1,458 sq mi)

Population (2021)
  - Total: 12,319
  - Density: 3.262/km^{2} (8.447/sq mi)
- CATOTTG code: UA46120070000071541
- Settlements: 28
- Rural settlements: 1
- Villages: 27
- Website: lopatynska-gromada.gov.ua

Lopatyn settlement hromada (Ukrainian: Лопатинська селищна громада) is a hromada in Ukraine, in Sheptytskyi Raion of Lviv Oblast. The administrative center is the rural settlement of Lopatyn.

== Settlements ==
The hromada consists of 1 rural settlement (Lopatyn) and 27 villages:

- Adamivka
- Baryliv
- Batyiv
- Bebekhy
- Berezivka
- Volytsia-Barylova
- Hrytsevolia
- Zavydche
- Zahatka
- Korchivka
- Kulykiv
- Kustyn
- Mykolaiv
- Nyvytsi
- Novostavtsi
- Pidmonastyrok
- Pustelnyky
- Romanivka
- Rudenko
- Smorzhiv
- Staryi Maidan
- Styrkivtsi
- Stremilche
- Triitsia
- Uvyn
- Khmilno
- Shchurovychi
