= Ruthenische Revue =

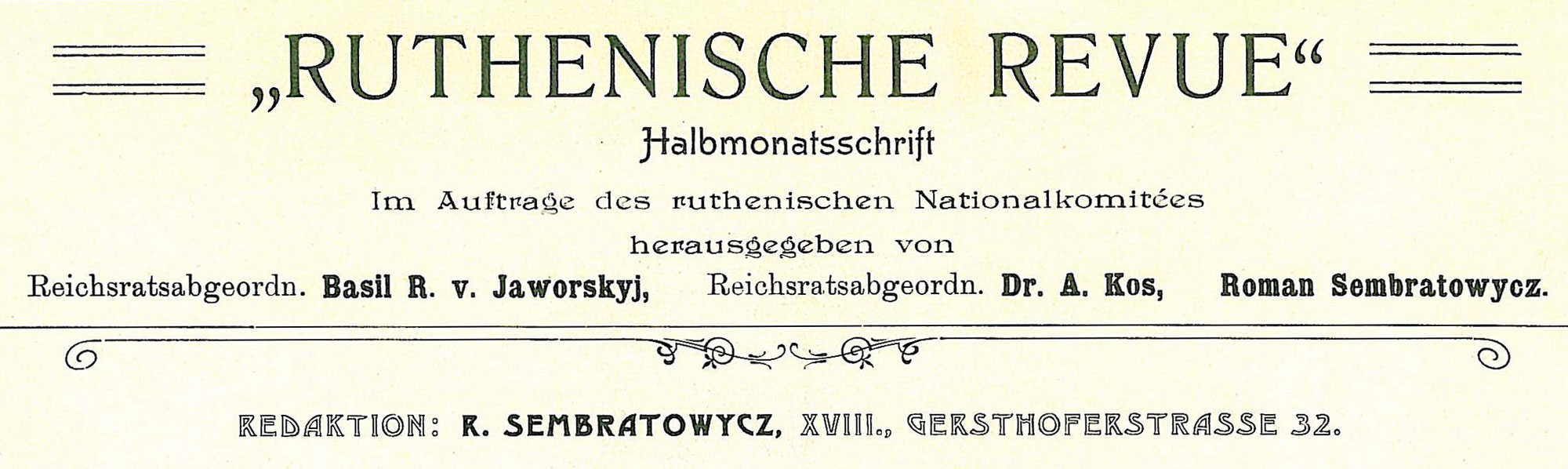
Letterhead from Ruthenische Revue

Ruthenische Revue (later known as Ukrainische Rundschau) was a German-language periodical published in Vienna, Austria by Vasyl Yavorskyi and Andriy Kos. The magazine featured articles and translations by numerous members of Ukrainian intelligentsia.

== History and profile ==
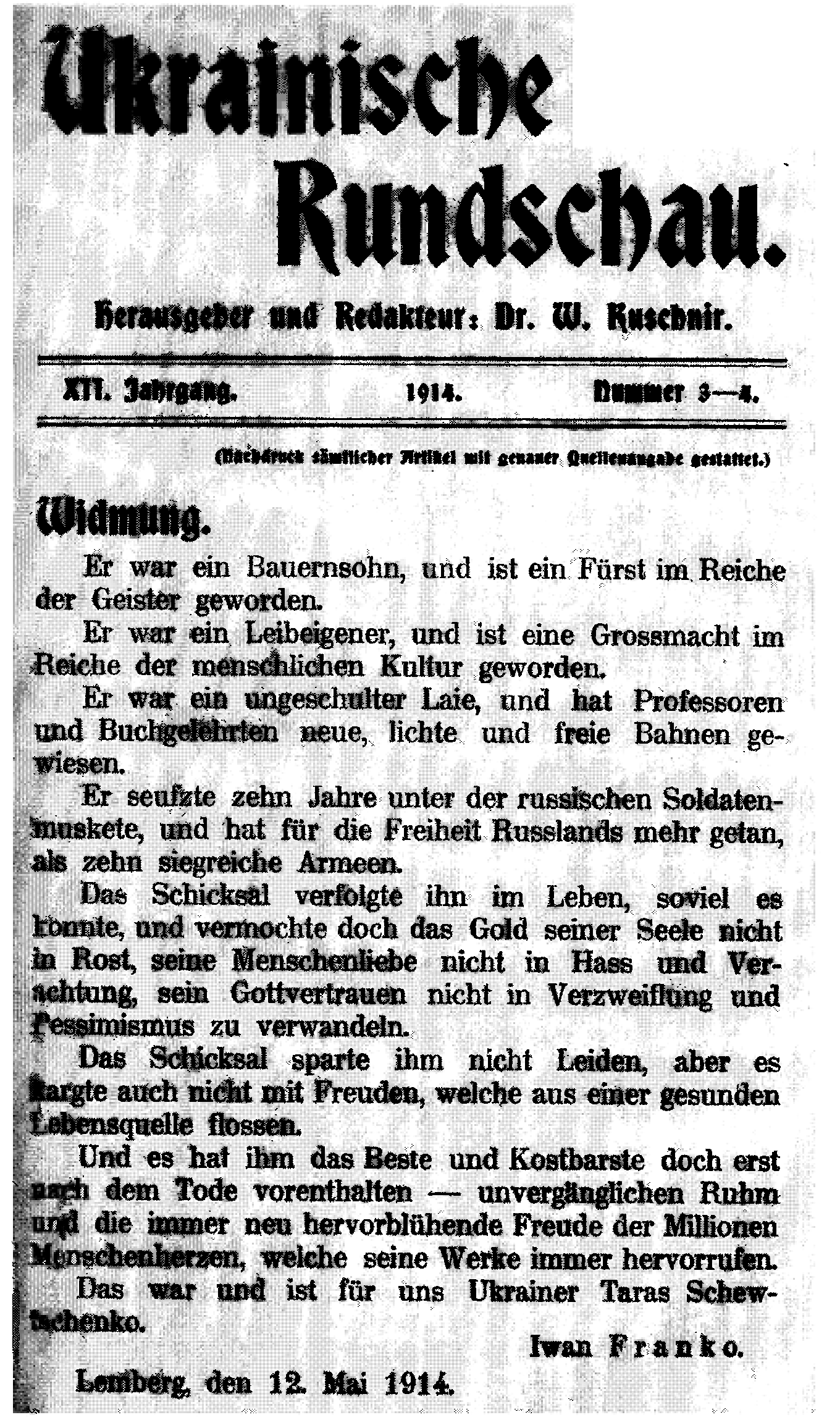
Ivan Franko's dedication to Taras Shevchenko at the poet's centenary published in Ukrainische Rundschau, 1914

Ruthenische Revue was published by Ruthenische Nationalkomitee from 1903 to 1905. It was based in Vienna. It tried to make the Ukrainian issue known among the European politicians and public. Several articles in Ruthenische Revue about the oppressed Ukrainian nation were published or quoted in different European newspapers.

The periodical was published twice a month from May 1903 until December 1905 and was edited by Roman Sembratovych with help of the members of the Austrian House of Deputies (Abgeordnetenhaus) Basil Ritter von Jaworskyj and Dr. Andreas Kos. The last two issues were edited by Basil Ritter von Jaworskyj.

The periodical was continued as Ukrainische Rundschau from 1906 until 1914, but edited by Volodymyr Kushnir.

Both Ruthenische Revue and Ukrainische Rundschau were printed in Ödenburg.

== Sources ==
- Volodymyr Kubijovyč (ed.): Ukraine. A Concise Encyclopædia, vol 2, p. 484, 487. University of Toronto Press 1971. ISBN 0-8020-3261-3.
- Maria Rózsa: Deutschsprachige Presse in Ungarn 1850–1920.
