= Radekhiv urban hromada =

Hromada in Lviv Oblast, Ukraine

Radekhiv urban hromada Радехівська міська громада
- Hromada
- Interactive map of Radekhiv urban hromada
- Country: Ukraine
- Oblast: Lviv Oblast
- Raion: Sheptytskyi Raion
- Admin. center: Radekhiv

Area
  - Total: 7,161 km^{2} (2,765 sq mi)

Population (2021)
  - Total: 33,531
  - Density: 4.682/km^{2} (12.13/sq mi)
- CATOTTG code: UA46120090000051307
- Settlements: 42
- Cities: 1
- Villages: 41
- Website: miskrada-radekhiv.gov.ua

Radekhiv urban hromada (Ukrainian: Радехівська міська громада) is a hromada in Ukraine, in Sheptytskyi Raion of Lviv Oblast. The administrative center is the city of Radekhiv.

== Settlements ==
The hromada consists of 1 city (Radekhiv) and 41 villages:

- Andriivka
- Babychi
- Byshiv
- Volytsia
- Vuzlove
- Hoholiv
- Huta-Skliana
- Dmytriv
- Dubyny
- Zabava
- Zboivska
- Yosypivka
- Korchyn
- Kryve
- Kuty
- Monastyrok-Ohliadivskyi
- Mukani
- Nemyliv
- Nestanychi
- Novyi Vytkiv
- Obortiv
- Ohliadiv
- Oplitsko
- Ordiv
- Pavliv
- Pyratyn
- Polove
- Radvantsi
- Rakovyshche
- Rozzhaliv
- Sabanivka
- Seredpiltsi
- Synkiv
- Stanyn
- Stoianiv
- Sushno
- Tetevchytsi
- Toboliv
- Torky
- Shainohy
- Yastrubychi
