= Radekhiv =

City in Lviv Oblast, Ukraine

Radekhiv Радехів
- City
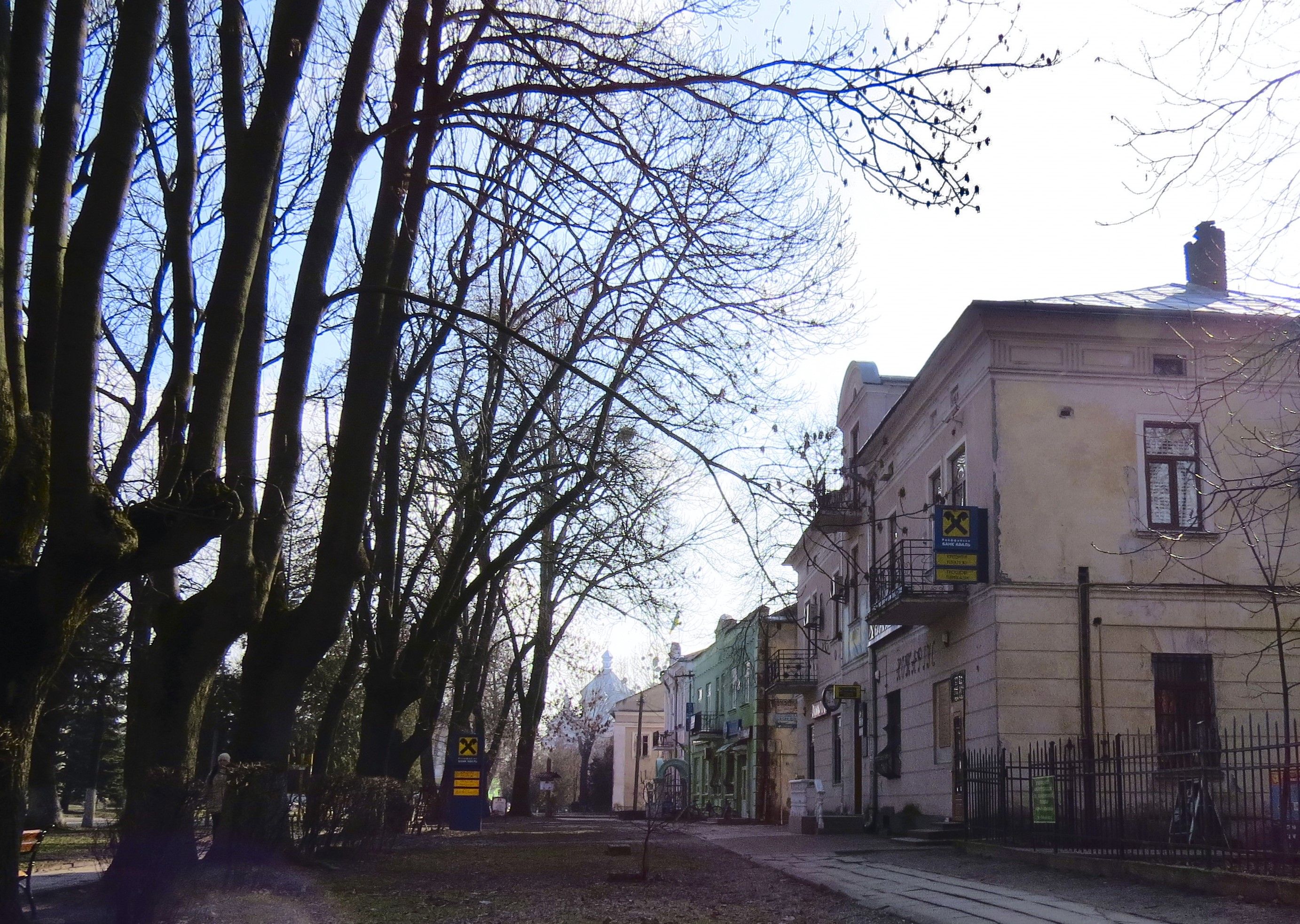
- Old Town

- Flag Coat of arms

- Location within Lviv Oblast Location within Ukraine
- Coordinates: 50°16′58″N 24°38′15″E
- Country: Ukraine
- Oblast: Lviv Oblast
- Raion: Sheptytskyi Raion
- Hromada: Radekhiv urban hromada
- First mentioned: 1472
- Magdeburg rights: 1752

Area
  - Total: 16.26 km^{2} (6.28 sq mi)
- Elevation: 231 m (758 ft)

Population (2022)
  - Total: 9,680
  - Density: 595/km^{2} (1,540/sq mi)
- Time zone: UTC+2 (EET)
  - Summer (DST): UTC+3 (EEST)
- Postal code: 80200
- Area code: +380-3255

Radekhiv (Ukrainian: Радехів, IPA: [rɐˈdɛxiu̯]; Polish: Radziechów, Yiddish: ראדיחוב) is a city in Sheptytskyi Raion, Lviv Oblast (region) of Ukraine. It hosts the administration of Radekhiv urban hromada, one of the hromadas of Ukraine. Population: 9,680 (2022 estimate).

Until 18 July 2020, Radekhiv was the administrative center of Radekhiv Raion. The raion was abolished in July 2020, as part of the administrative reform of Ukraine, which reduced the number of raions of Lviv Oblast to seven. The area of Radekhiv Raion was merged into Chervonohrad Raion (modern Sheptytskyi Raion).

== History ==
=== Early history ===
The first written mention of Radekhiv dates back to 1472. The territory on which the city was founded was part of the Belz principality, which was formed around 1170 and belonged first to the Volodymyr-Volyn and then to the Galicia-Volyn principalities, Lithuania, Hungary and Poland, before it was directly incorporated into Poland in 1462, as the Bełz Voivodeship. In 1578, the Tatars completely destroyed Radekhiv, Vytkiv, Polove, and Seredpiltsi, as can be seen in the tax books of the time.

At the beginning of the eighteenth century Radekhiv came under the ownership of Count Wilhelm Mier, a veteran of the Great Northern War of Scottish origin. His son Józef, who was awarded the title of earl in 1775, built a large Classicist palace in the town, that became the center of the magnate's latifundia. Trade gradually began to revive in Radekhiv, which turned it into a city.

The town was annexed by Austria in the First Partition of Poland in 1772.

=== Late modern period ===
In the second half of the nineteenth century, the Radekhiv latifundia passed to the family of Count Badeni, who married Mier's daughter. Badeni was considered seventh of the ten richest magnates in Galicia and was the Austrian emperor's governor in the region. He rebuilt and expanded the palace, planted a park, built a greenhouse, and ordered a three-meter high stone wall to enclose his property. Count Badeni, the father, did much to enrich himself. At that time there were small industrial and commercial firms in Radekhiv. In 1910, the construction of the Lviv-Stoyaniv railroad was completed in Radekhiv, financed by Badeni.

According to statistics, in 1880 Radekhiv was home to 3555 people. It is known that 129 people served at the public court.

In the late nineteenth and early twentieth centuries, a number of public organizations existed in Radekhiv, including the "Farmer" society. For 16 years, there was a "Money Society of Friends of School Children," which aimed to provide financial assistance to poor children, regardless of their nationality or religion. There was also a Brotherhood of Sobriety.

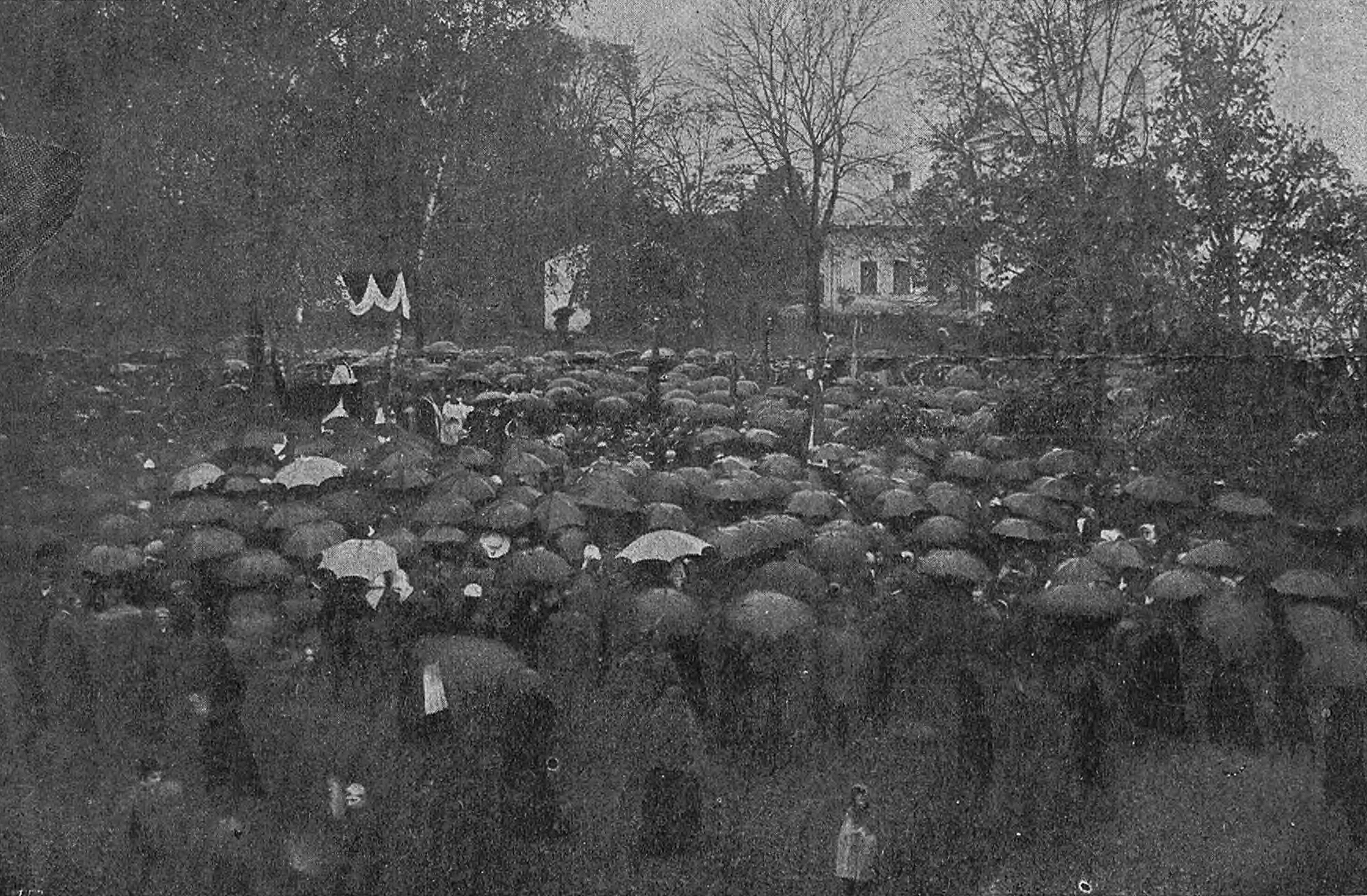
Funeral of Stanisław Marcin Badeni in 1912

Since the second half of the nineteenth century, the Prosvita society has been operating, which aimed to protect the interests of the Ukrainian language and culture and to raise the level of education of the local Ukrainian population. A reading room was opened in Radekhiv in May 1897.

In November 1912, the People's House was solemnly consecrated. Nowadays, this building houses the Radekhiv Central Library at the city council. The People's House housed an industrial school, a folk school, the Native School, Enlightenment, and Agricultural Society. At the end of 2018, Radekhiv became the administrative center of the united territorial community.

Pre-WWII coat of arms

In the interwar period, Radziechów, as it was known in Polish, was a county seat in the Tarnopol Voivodeship of Poland. The town had a Jewish population of about 2,000, about half its residents, before World War II.

=== World War II ===
Following the invasion of Poland in September 1939, Radziechów was first occupied by the Soviet Union until 1941, then by Nazi Germany until 1944, and then re-occupied by the Soviet Union, which eventually annexed it from Poland in 1945. The local police chief and five more Polish policemen were murdered by the Russians in the Katyn massacre in 1940.

Some Jews were murdered immediately when the town was occupied by Germany in June 1941. In September 1942, 1400 Jews were sent to the Belzec extermination camp, and more Jews were concentrated in a newly established ghetto from elsewhere, and themselves were later sent to Belzec.

During the Second World War, the city's palace was ruined by bombing. Its ruins were later demolished by Soviet authorities, with only a greenhouse remaining. A district office of the Communist Party was built on the site of the palace in the post-war years.

=== Recent history ===
In 1972 the city's Catholic church of Saint Anne, which had been previously transferred under control of the Soviet Army, was demolished, and a polyclinic was later constructed in its place.

== Points of interest ==
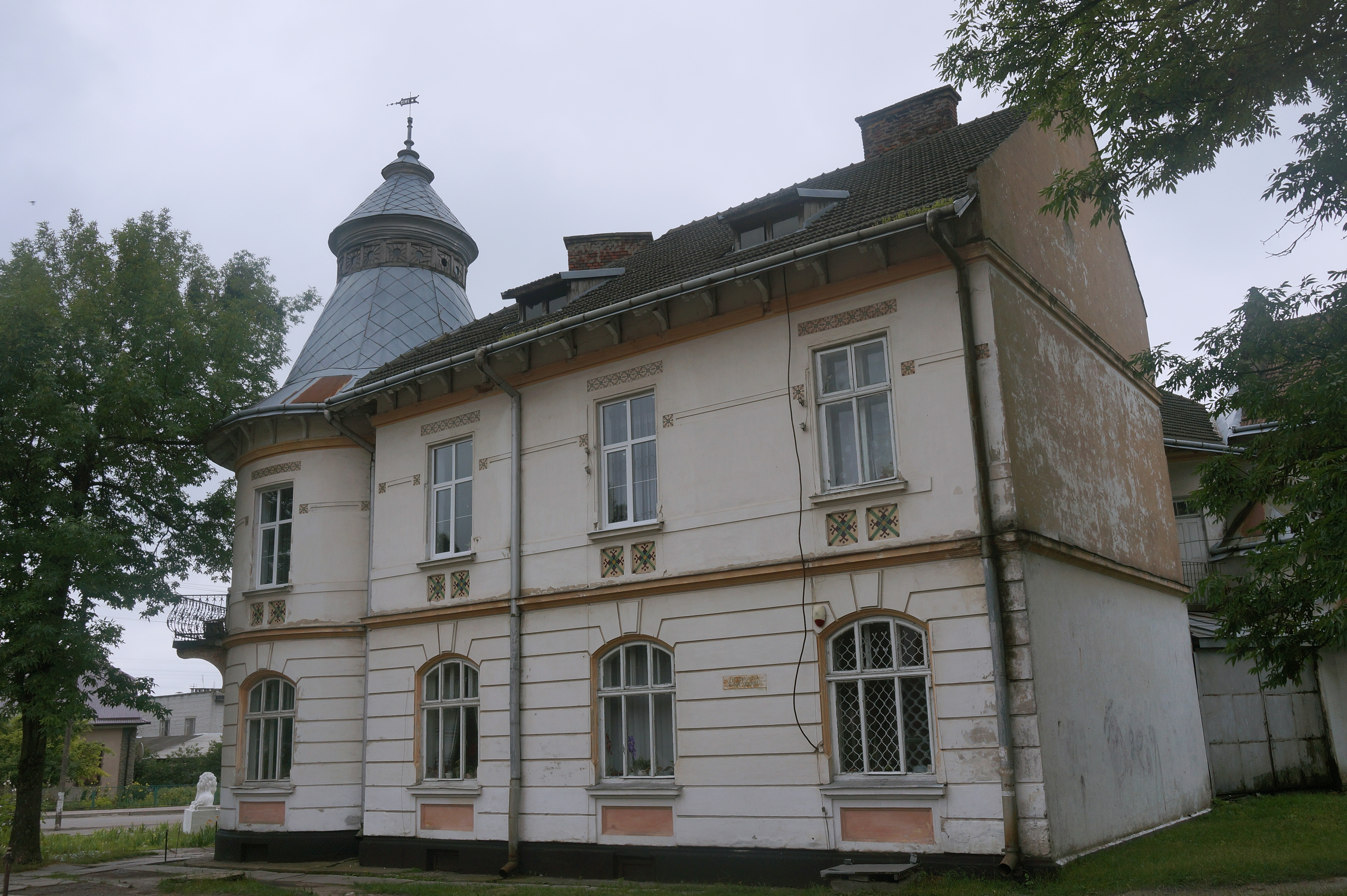
Radekhiv People's House

- Wooden church of Saint Nicholas (built in 1918)
- Synagogue (built in 18th century, non-functioning)
- People's House (built in 1912 by architect Ivan Levynskyi)
- City council building (former villa)
- Arts school (former Polish Sokół movement building)
- Local museum (located in a wooden villa)

== Famous people ==
- Teodor Mykytyn - Ukrainian writer
- Osyp Turianskyi - Ukrainian writer
- Ihor Bilozir - Ukrainian composer
- Levko Lukianenko - dissident, worked in the city
- Ed Stelmach - premier of the Canadian province of Alberta (2006-2011), descended from immigrants who arrived from Radekhiv.
- Kazimierz Wladyslaw Kumaniecki - Polish lawyer and government minister
- Marian Szumlakowski - Polish diplomat
- Juliusz Ross - Polish art historian

== Gallery ==
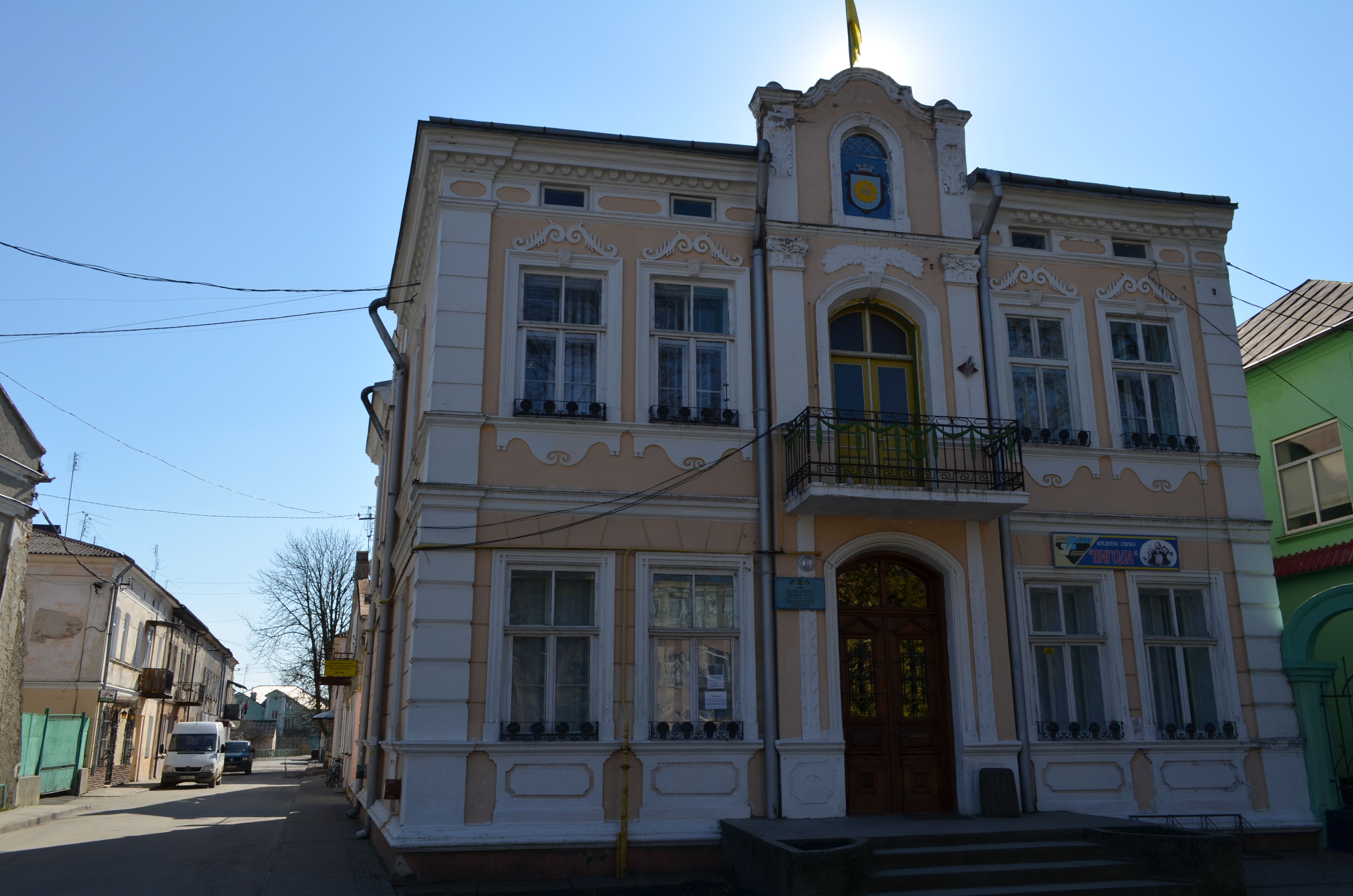
City hall

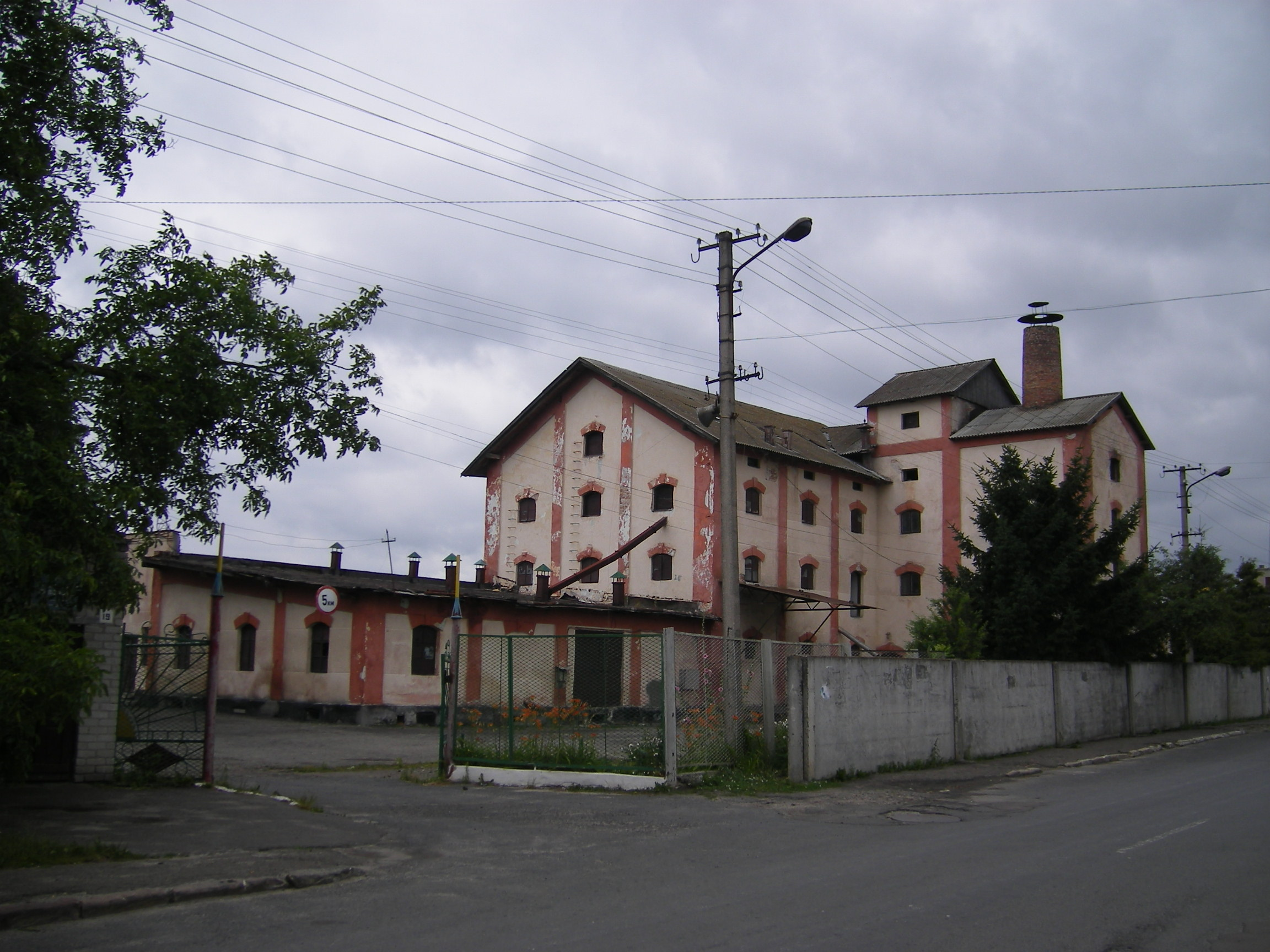
Old brewery

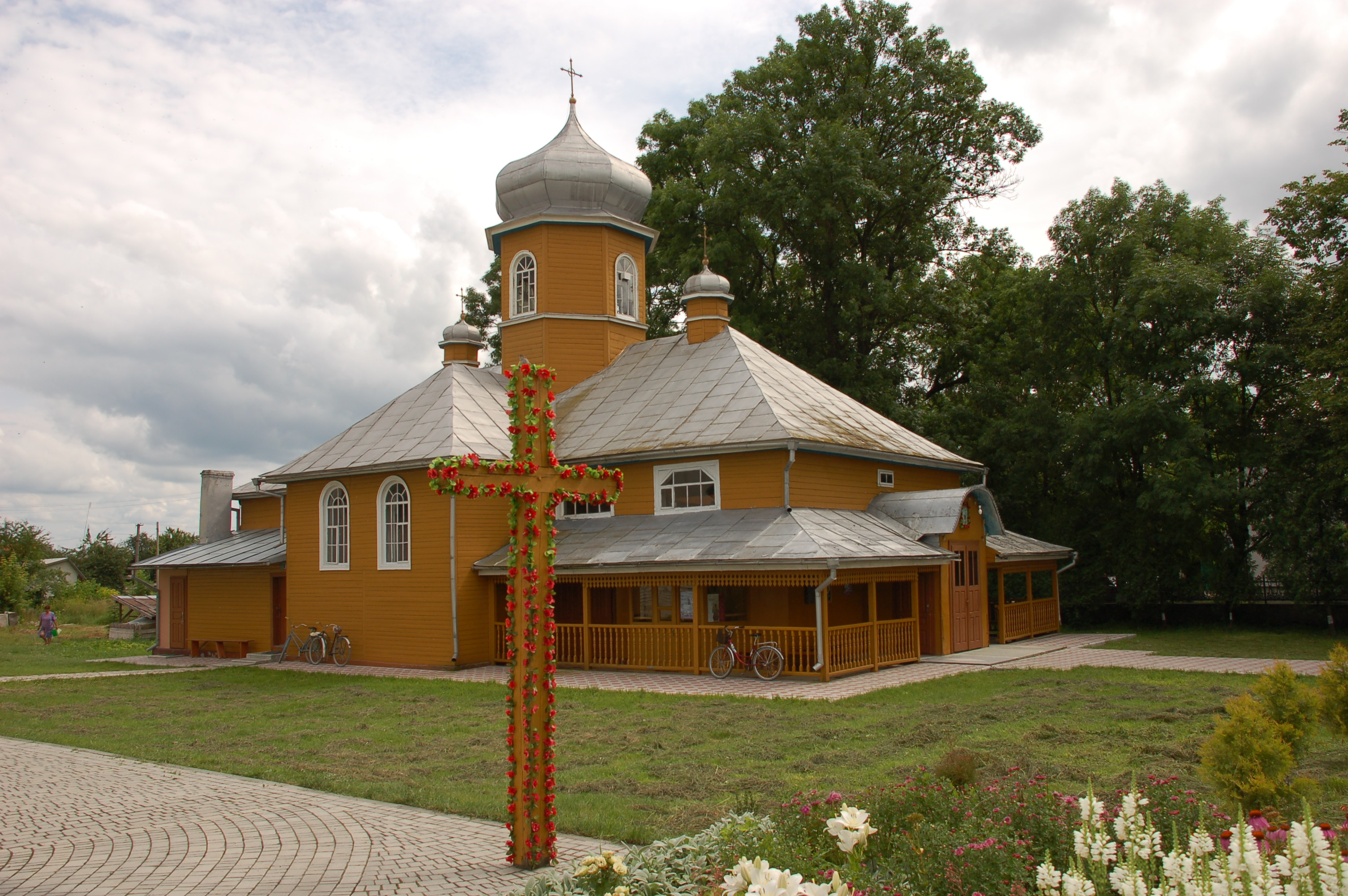
Old Saint Nicholas Church

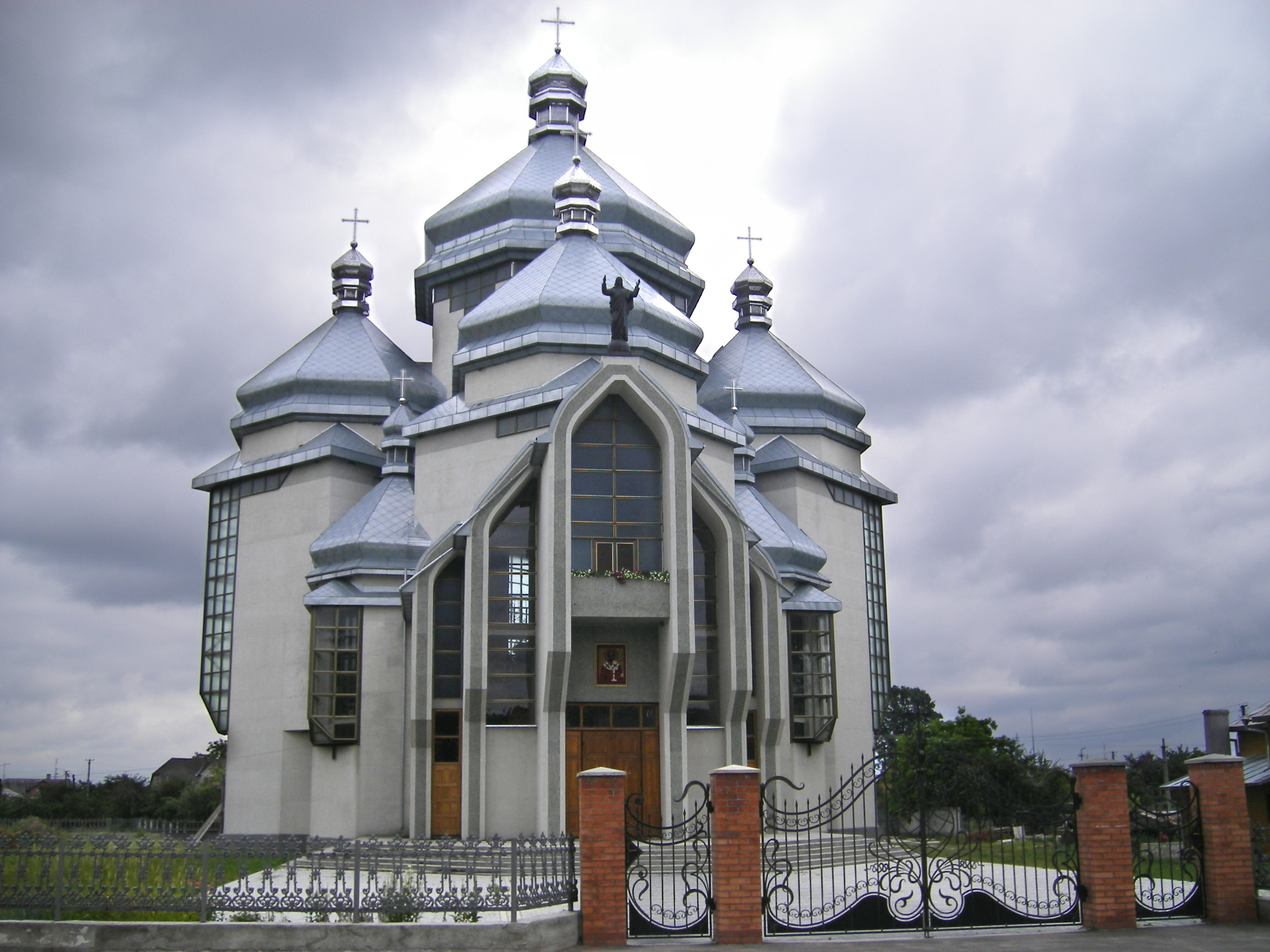
New Saint Nicholas Church

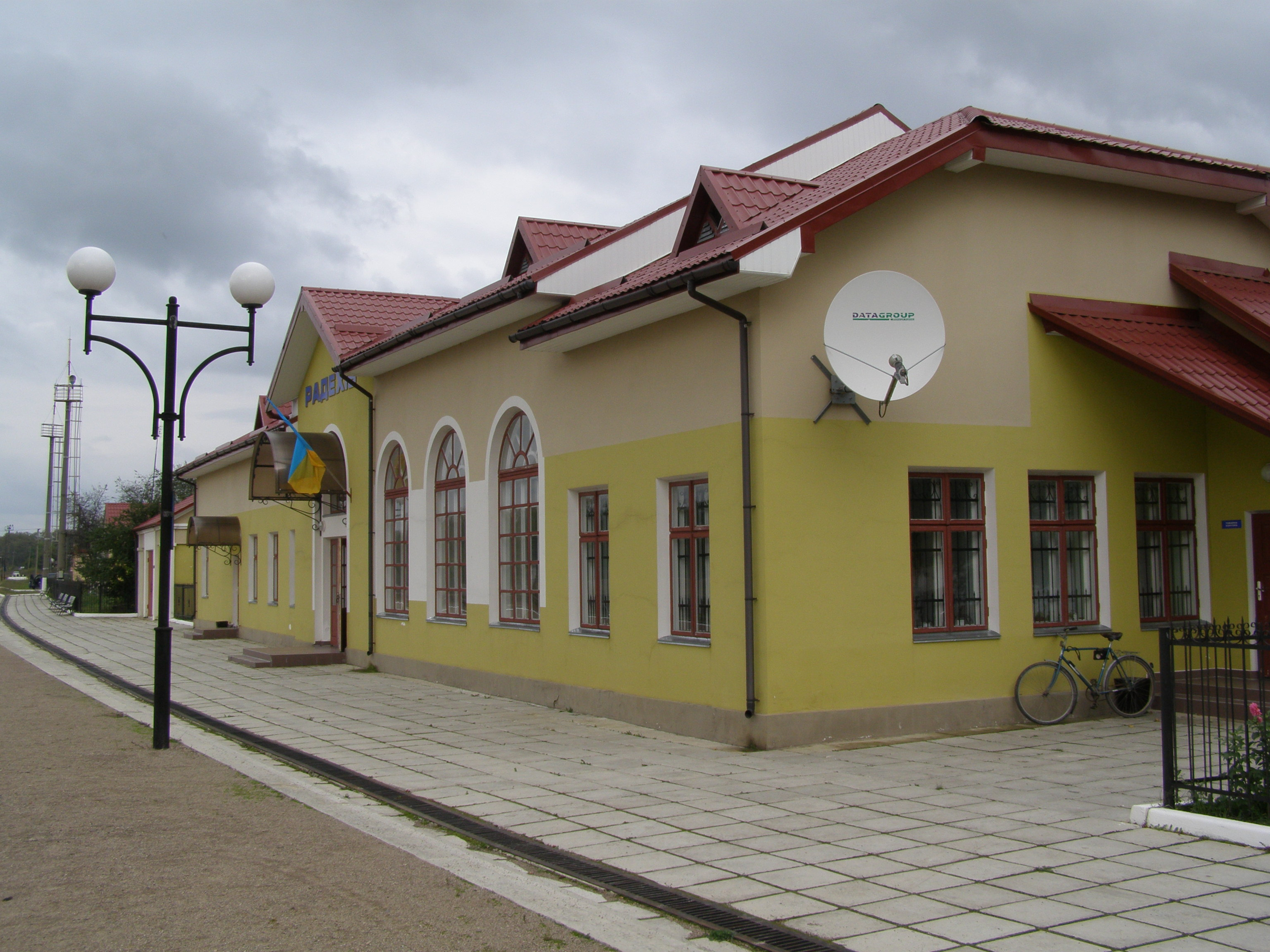
Railway station
