= Radekhiv Raion =

Former subdivision of Lviv Oblast, Ukraine

Radekhiv Raion Радехівський район
- Raion
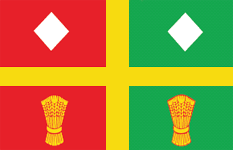
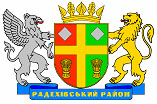
- Flag Coat of arms

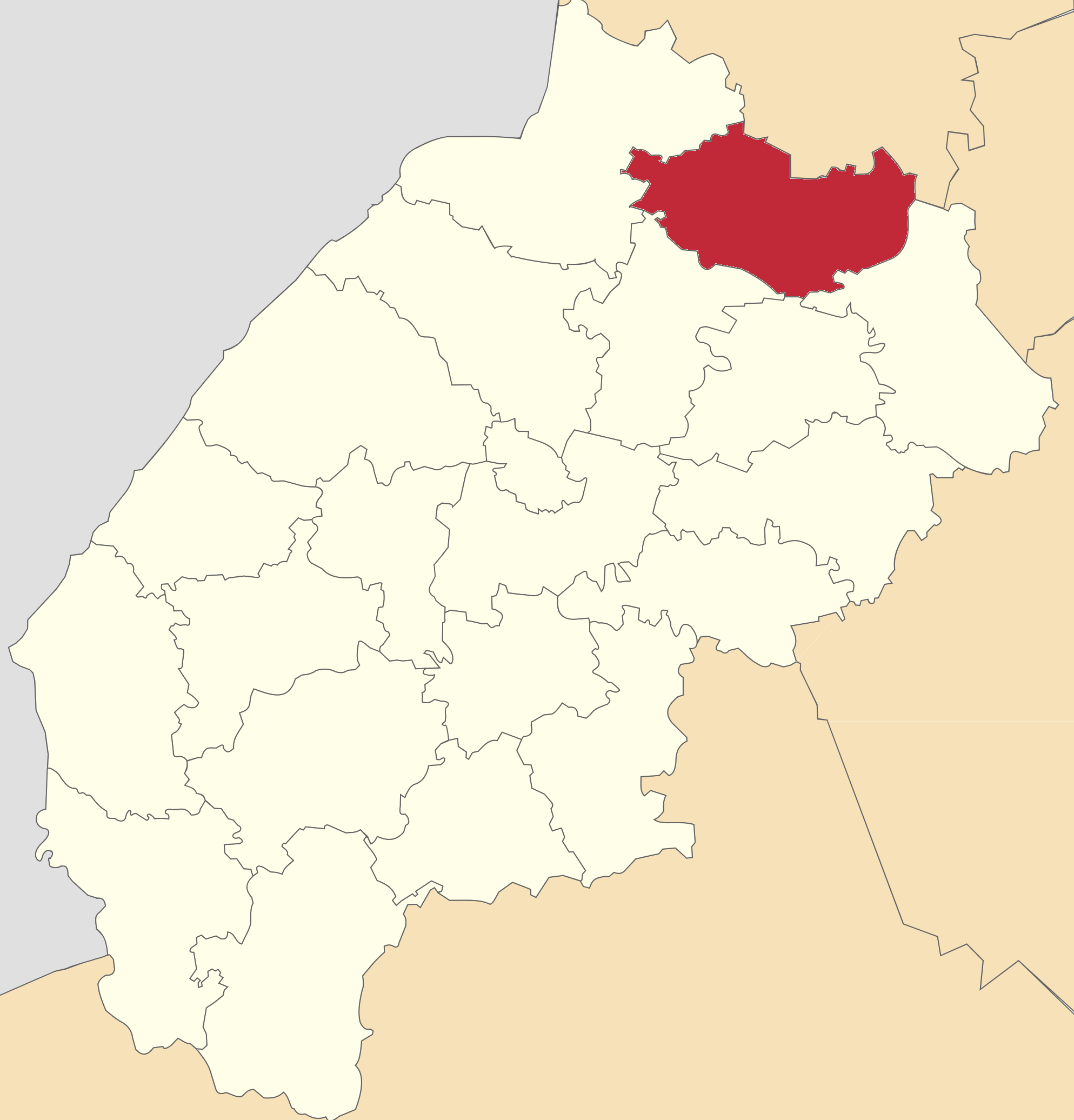
- Coordinates: 50°16′58″N 24°40′31″E
- Country: Ukraine
- Region: Lviv Oblast
- Established: 1965
- Disestablished: 18 July 2020
- Admin. center: Radekhiv
- Subdivisions: List: — city councils; — settlement councils; — rural councils; Number of localities: — cities; — urban-type settlements; 69 — villages; — rural settlements

Area
  - Total: 114 km^{2} (44 sq mi)

Population (2020)
  - Total: 46,634
  - Density: 409/km^{2} (1,060/sq mi)
- Time zone: UTC+02:00 (EET)
  - Summer (DST): UTC+03:00 (EEST)
- Postal index: 80200-80271
- Area code: 380-3264
- Website: http://www.radekhiv.lviv.ua/index.php Radekhivskyi Raion

Radekhiv Raion (Ukrainian: Радехівський район) was a raion (district) in Lviv Oblast in western Ukraine. Its administrative center was Radekhiv. The raion was abolished on 18 July 2020 as part of the administrative reform of Ukraine, which reduced the number of raions of Lviv Oblast to seven. The area of Radekhiv Raion was merged into Chervonohrad Raion. The last estimate of the raion population was 46,634 (2020 est.).

It was established in 1965.

At the time of disestablishment, the raion consisted of two hromadas:

- Lopatyn settlement hromada with the administration in the urban-type settlement of Lopatyn;
- Radekhiv urban hromada with the administration in Radekhiv.

== See also ==
- Administrative divisions of Lviv Oblast
