= Sheptytskyi Raion =

Subdivision of Lviv Oblast, Ukraine

Sheptytskyi Raion Шептицький район
- Raion
- Flag Coat of arms

- Country: Ukraine
- Oblast: Lviv Oblast
- Established: 2020
- Admin. center: Sheptytskyi
- Subdivisions: 7 hromadas

Area
  - Total: 2,997 km^{2} (1,157 sq mi)

Population (2022)
  - Total: 226,102
  - Density: 75.44/km^{2} (195.4/sq mi)
- Time zone: UTC+02:00 (EET)
  - Summer (DST): UTC+03:00 (EEST)
- Postal index: N/A

Sheptytskyi Raion (Ukrainian: Шептицький район) is a raion (district) of Lviv Oblast, Ukraine. It was known as Chervonohrad Raion (Ukrainian: Червоноградський район) from 2020 until 2024. The center of the raion is the city of Sheptytskyi. Population: 226,102 (2022 estimate).

== History ==
From the 12th century, the area that is now Sheptytskyi Raion was part of the Duchy of Belz, before being incorporated into the Polish Belz Voivodeship in the 15th century. The areas became part of the Ukrainian SSR as a result of the 1951 Polish–Soviet territorial exchange.

The raion was created as Chervonohrad Raion on 18 July 2020 as part of the reform of administrative divisions of Ukraine. Two abolished raions, Radekhiv and Sokal raions, as well as Chervonohrad Municipality and part of Kamianka-Buzka Raion, were merged into the new raion.

On 19 September 2024, the Verkhovna Rada voted to rename Chervonohrad Raion to Sheptytskyi Raion along with the renaming of Chervonohrad to Sheptytskyi.

== Geography ==
Sheptytskyi Raion is located in the northern part of Lviv Oblast, on the Poland–Ukraine border.

=== Subdivisions ===
The raion consists of 7 hromadas:

- Belz urban hromada with the administration in the city of Belz, transferred from Sokal Raion;
- Dobrotvir settlement hromada with the administration in the rural settlement of Dobrotvir, transferred from Kamianka-Buzka Raion;
- Lopatyn settlement hromada with the administration in the rural settlement of Lopatyn, transferred from Radekhiv Raion;
- Radekhiv urban hromada with the administration in the city of Radekhiv, transferred from Radekhiv Raion;
- Sheptytskyi urban hromada with the administration in the city of Sheptytskyi, transferred from Chervonohrad Municipality;
- Sokal urban hromada with the administration in the city of Sokal, transferred from Sokal Raion;
- Velyki Mosty urban hromada with the administration in the city of Velyki Mosty, transferred from Sokal Raion.

== Symbols ==
New designs for the coat of arms and flag of the raion were approved on 20 August 2021. The design elements invoke the flags of the former Radekhiv Raion and Sokal Raion, as well as references to the city of Sheptytskyi and the older political history of the land.
