= Lukavets =

Rural locality in Lviv Oblast, Ukraine

Coordinates: 49°51′0″N 25°10′12″E

- Village
- Interactive map of Lukavets
- Country: Ukraine
- Oblast: Lviv
- Raion: Zolochiv
- Area: 0.871 km^{2} (0.336 sq mi)
- Elevation: 350 m (1,150 ft)
- Population: 213
  - Density: 244/km^{2} (630/sq mi)

Lukavets (Ukrainian: Лукавець) is a village (selo) in Zolochiv Raion, Lviv Oblast, in western Ukraine. It belongs to Pidkamin settlement hromada, one of the hromadas of Ukraine.

From 1918 to 1939, the village was in Tarnopol Voivodeship in Poland.

The villages of Lukavets, Zvyzhen, Batkiv, and Mezhyhory were previously subordinated to the Batkiv village council. The population is 198 people.

Until 18 July 2020, Lukavets belonged to Brody Raion. The raion was abolished in July 2020 as part of the administrative reform of Ukraine, which reduced the number of raions of Lviv Oblast to seven. The area of Brody Raion was merged into Zolochiv Raion.
