= Mykhailo Bondar =

Ukrainian politician (born 1973)

- Михайло Бондар
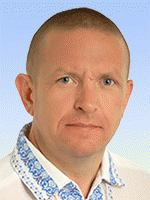
- Official portrait, 2019

People's Deputy of Ukraine
- Incumbent
- Assumed office 27 November 2014
- Preceded by: Iryna Sekh
- Constituency: Lviv Oblast, No. 119

Personal details
- Born: 17 November 1973 (age 53) Bodyachiv, Ukrainian SSR, Soviet Union (now Ukraine)
- Party: European Solidarity (since 2019)
- Other political affiliations: Independent; People's Front
- Education: University of Lviv

Military service
- Allegiance: Ukraine
- Branch/service: Armed Forces of Ukraine (1992–1994); National Guard of Ukraine (2014)
- Years of service: 1992–1994; 2014
- Commands: Kulchytsky Battalion
- Battles/wars: Russo-Ukrainian War; War in Donbas

Mykhailo Leontiyovych Bondar (Ukrainian: Михайло Леонтійович Бондар; born 17 November 1973) is a Ukrainian former National Guard volunteer and politician currently serving as a People's Deputy of Ukraine from Ukraine's 119th electoral district since 27 November 2014.

== Early life and career ==
Mykhailo Leontiyovych Bondar was born on 17 November 1973 in the village of Bodyachiv, in Lviv Oblast of what was then the Soviet Union. From 1992 to 1994, he served in the Armed Forces of Ukraine. From 1997 to 1998, he served as accounting in the Zhvyrka village council, before working in accounting in the Sokal Raion telecommunications unit of Lviv ODPEZ Ukrtelekom. In 1999, he worked in the Sokal Raion section of the Lviv chapter of the company Gas Ukraine.

From 1997 to 2006, Bondar studied at University of Lviv, graduating with a specialisation in Finance, Economics, and Entrepreneurship.

== War in Donbas ==
Bondar was an active supporter of Euromaidan and the Revolution of Dignity, participating in the Maidan Self-Defence. Following the beginning of the Russo-Ukrainian War, Bondar volunteered to join the National Guard of Ukraine. He participated in the Battle of Debaltseve and the Siege of Sloviansk, being wounded at the latter. He was commander of the Kulchytsky Battalion.

== People's Deputy of Ukraine ==
Bondar participated in the 2014 Ukrainian parliamentary election as the candidate of the People's Front as People's Deputy of Ukraine from Ukraine's 119th electoral district. He won the elections with 26.36% of the vote; incumbent People's Deputy Iryna Sekh of Svoboda won only 13.60%, placing fourth. Following his election, Bondar sat as an independent, and was head of the coal subcommittee of the Verkhovna Rada Committee on the Fuel-Energy Complex, Nuclear Policy, and Nuclear Security.

Bondar was re-elected in the 2019 Ukrainian parliamentary election, this time as the candidate of European Solidarity. He won with a margin of 139 votes above the next-closest candidate, Orest Kavetskyi of Servant of the People. He is a member of the European Solidarity faction in the Verkhovna Rada, as well as the Committee on Energy and Housing-Communal Services.

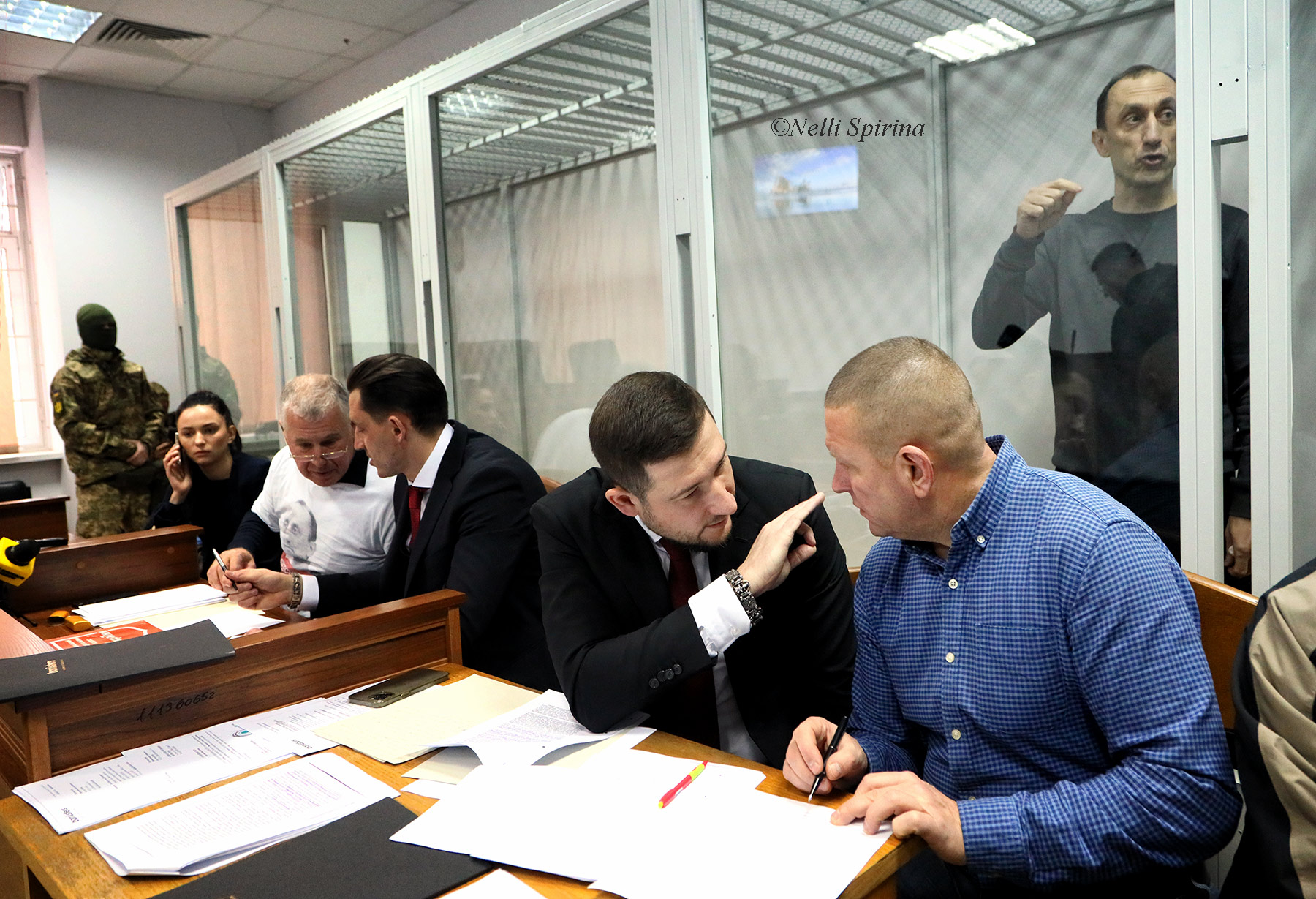
Mykhailo Bondar writes an application for the bail of Colonel Chervinsky in the Shevchenko Court of Kyiv on December 13, 2023

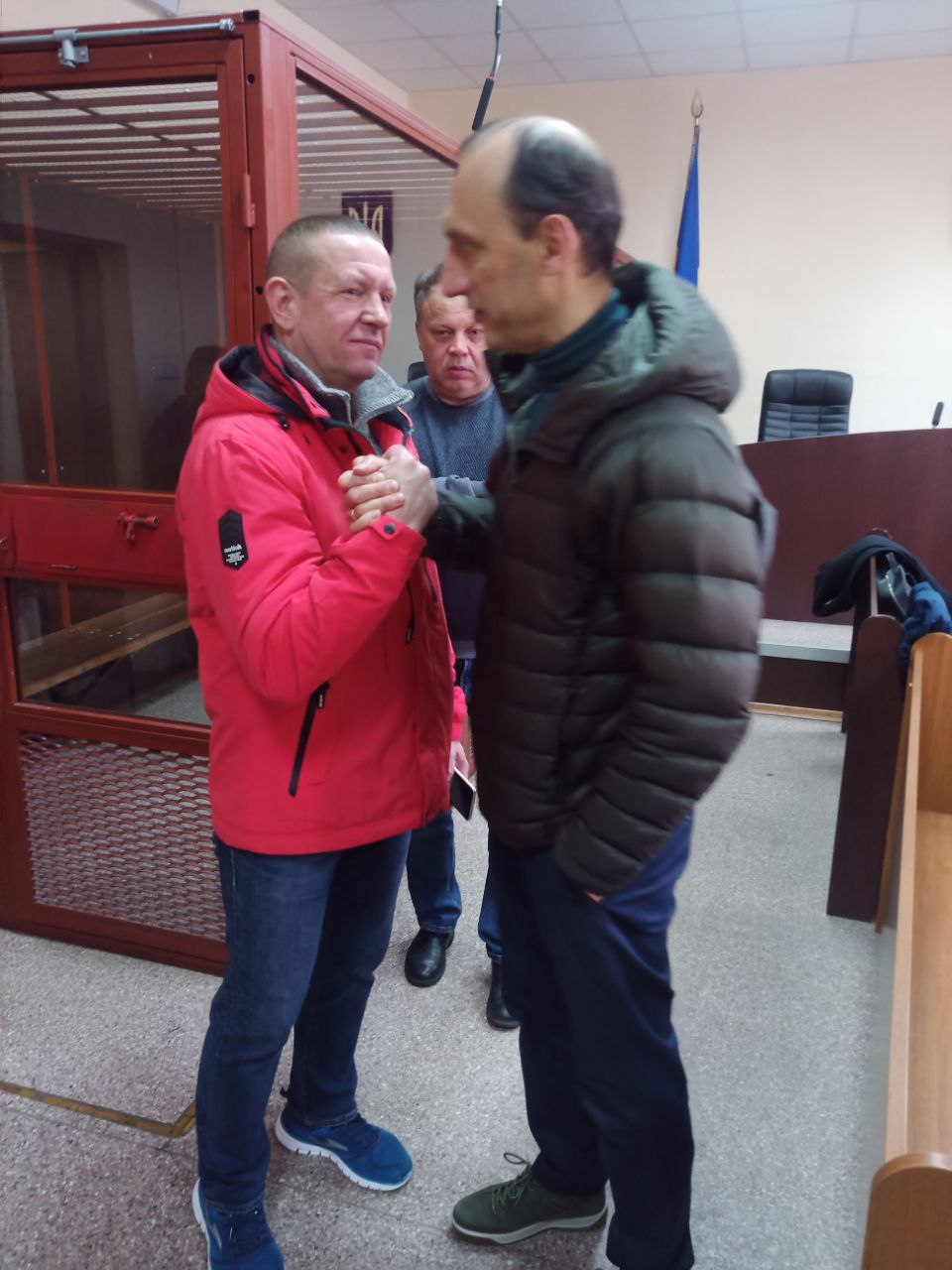
Mykhailo Bondar communicates with Colonel Chervinsky in the Pechersk Court of Kyiv on March 18, 2025

In the trial of Colonel Roman Chervinsky, he actively supports Chervinsky.

== Honors and awards ==
- Award of the President of Ukraine - Jubilee Medal “25 Years of Independence of Ukraine” (2016).
- Award of the President of Ukraine “For participation in the anti-terrorist operation” - 2016.
- Medal “Defender of the Fatherland” - 2015.
- Order “For Courage”, III class - 2017.
