= Huta Pieniacka =

- Village (destroyed)
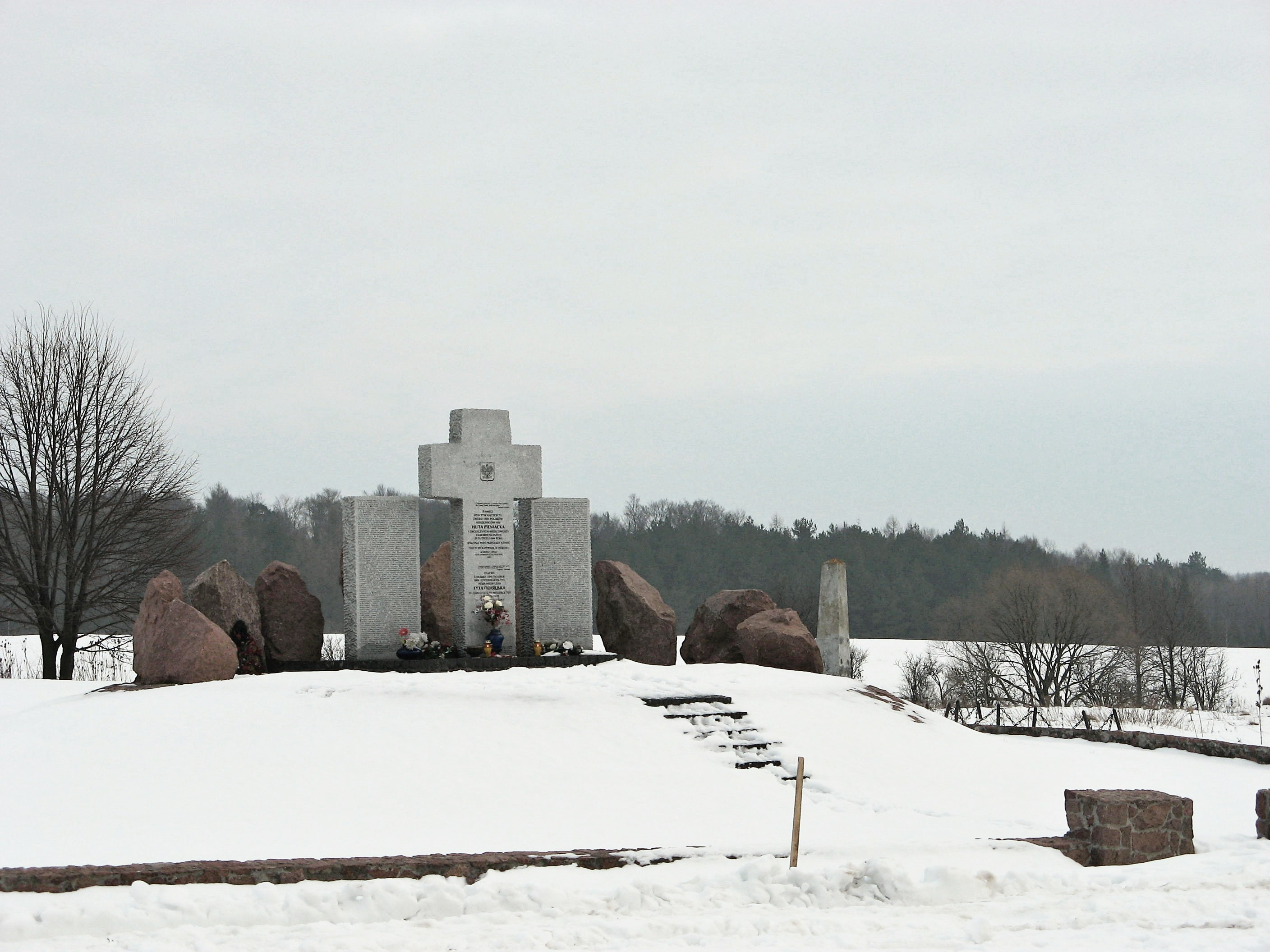
- Huta Pieniacka monument

- Location of eradicated village
- Coordinates: 49.902°N 25.099°E
- Country: Ukraine (location)
- Destroyed: 1944, occupied Poland (now Ukraine)

Huta Pieniacka (Ukrainian: Гута Пеняцька, Huta Peniatska) – was an ethnic Polish village of about 1,000 inhabitants until 1939, located in Tarnopol Voivodeship, Poland (modern-day Zolochiv Raion, Lviv Oblast, Ukraine). The site of what was once the village is currently located some 50 km from Ternopil, beside the village of Holubytsia (Ukrainian: Голубиця) and Peniaky in Zolochiv Raion.

== History ==
During the German-Soviet War the village was the location of the Soviet partisan detachment under the command of NKVD colonel Dmitry Medvedev.

On February 28, 1944 almost all of the villagers, mostly of Polish ethnic background, plus several hundred refugees from Volhynia, and about 20 hidden Jews, were all murdered. What wasn't already burned in the village, was otherwise razed during the Huta Pieniacka massacre, deemed later as a pre-planned pacification action by the 4th SS police regiment, which was later adjoined to the SS Galizien (the conclusion of both Polish and Ukrainian historical commissions). The village of Huta Pieniacka no longer exists. All the homes were burned during the massacre, with only the school and the Roman Catholic church remaining. Both of these buildings were demolished after the war, and the area where the village once stood, is a pasture where cattle now graze. A concrete post with an inscription in Ukrainian was placed in what was the center of the former village, but the inscribed plaque with the village name disappeared sometime during the 1990s.

== Recent events ==
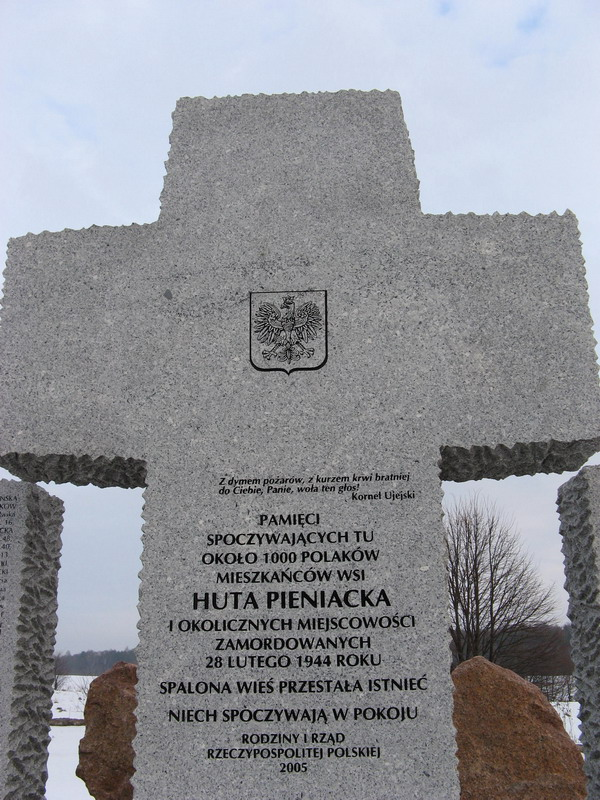
Plaque on the monument

In 2009, the then presidents of the two countries, Lech Kaczyński and Viktor Yushchenko respectively, visited the site to pay tribute to the victims.

The monument stands in the now non-existent village of Huta Pieniacka in the modern-day Lviv oblast of western Ukraine, where it was erected in memory of the approximately 1000 residents, of the then Polish village, who were brutally burned to death inside the village church, barns, and homes by the SS regiment on the 28th of February 1944.

On the 9th of January 2017, the Monument for the Victims of the World War II Massacre, was vandalized. The stone cross was blown up, and the two stone tables, with names of the persons killed in the 1944 massacre were damaged.

The memorial was restored within a month and the Ambassador of Poland to Ukraine, Jan Pieklo, visited the memorial on 28 February 2017 during the remembrance ceremony and called it "a huge surprise". "This was a miracle of sorts. First, there was information that a cross returned to its place. A consulate employee went to Huta Pieniacka and returned with photos confirming the news. It is a replica of the original cross and it is made of granite", said Jan Pieklo.
