= Skomorokhy, Lviv Oblast =

Village in Lviv Oblast, Ukraine

Skomorokhy Скоморохи
- Village
- Location in Lviv Oblast
- Coordinates: 50°32′06″N 24°19′40″E
- Country: Ukraine
- Oblast: Ternopil Oblast
- Raion: Chervonohrad
- Hromada: Sokal

Area
  - Total: 1.547 km^{2} (0.597 sq mi)
- Elevation: 192 m (630 ft)

Population (2001)
  - Total: 893
- Time zone: UTC+2 (EET)
  - Summer (DST): UTC+3 (EEST)
- Postal code: 80024
- Area code: +380 3257

Skomorokhy (Ukrainian: Скоморохи) is a village in Chervonohrad Raion, Lviv Oblast of western Ukraine. It belongs to Sokal urban hromada, one of the hromadas of Ukraine.

== History ==
Skomorokhy is described in detail in the royal lustration of 1565.

The village remained part of Poland until the first partition of Poland, when it was annexed by the Habsburg Empire, as part of Galicia. It was located in the Sokal district, one of the 78 Bezirkshauptmannschaften in the Austrian Galicia province (Crown land) in 1900. After World War I, possession of this province was disputed between Poland and Soviet Russia, until the 1921 Peace of Riga, which attributed Eastern Galicia to Poland. In the Second Polish Republic, Skomorokhy was located in Sokal county in Lwow Voivodeship. On 1 January 1939, 1,320 people lived in the village (1,000 Greek-Catholic Ukrainians, 120 Roman-Catholic Ukrainians, 65 Poles, 130 Polish interwar colonists and 5 Jews). After World War II ended, Skomorokhy was ceded to the Ukrainian SSR in August 1945.

Until 18 July 2020, Skomorokhy was located in Sokal Raion. The raion was abolished in July 2020 as part of the administrative reform of Ukraine, which reduced the number of raions of Lviv Oblast to seven. The area of Sokal Raion was merged into Chervonohrad Raion.
