= Zavyshen =

Village in Lviv Oblast, Ukraine

Zavyshen Завишень
- Location within Lviv Oblast Location within Ukraine
- Coordinates: 50.4453°N 24.2611°E
- Country: Ukraine
- Oblast: Lviv Oblast
- Raion: Sheptytskyi Raion

Area
  - Total: 2.59 km^{2} (1.00 sq mi)

Population (2001 Census)
  - Total: 1,020
  - Density: 467.18/km^{2} (1,210.0/sq mi)
- Time zone: UTC+2 (EET)
  - Summer (DST): UTC+3 (EEST)
- Postal code: 80041
- Area code: +380 3257

Zavyshen (Ukrainian: Завишень) is a village in Ukraine. It is situated in Sheptytskyi Raion, Lviv Oblast. This village is situated in the left bank of the Bug. It belongs to Sokal urban hromada, one of the hromadas of Ukraine. The population of village is around 1020 people. Total area of Zavyshen is 2,59 square kilometres. Postal code of this village is 80041.

Until 18 July 2020, Zavyshen belonged to Sokal Raion. The raion was abolished in July 2020 as part of the administrative reform of Ukraine, which reduced the number of raions of Lviv Oblast to seven. The area of Sokal Raion was merged into Sheptytskyi Raion.
