= Shyshkivtsi =

Shyshkivtsi is a toponym of several populated places in Ukraine.

It may refer to:

- Shyshkivtsi, Brody Raion
- Shyshkivtsi, Borshchiv Hromada
- Shyshkivtsi, Kitsman Raion
