= Bobiatyn =

Rural locality in Lviv Oblast, Ukraine

Bobiatyn Боб'ятин
- Village
- Location within Ukraine Location within Lviv Oblast
- Coordinates: 50°30′02″N 24°26′13″E
- Country: Ukraine
- Oblast: Lviv Oblast
- Raion: Sheptytskyi Raion
- Hromada: Sokal urban hromada
- Established: 1448

Area
  - Total: 222 km^{2} (86 sq mi)
- Elevation /(average value of): 207 m (679 ft)

Population (2001)
  - Total: ▼878
  - Density: 395/km^{2} (1,020/sq mi)
- Time zone: UTC+2 (EET)
  - Summer (DST): UTC+3 (EEST)
- Postal code: 80030
- Area code: +380 3257
- Website: село Боб'ятин, райцентр Сокаль ^{(Ukrainian)}

Bobiatyn (also Bob'iatyn, Bobyatin, Bobyatyn; Ukrainian: Боб'ятин [boˈbjɑtɪn]) is a small village, which is located in Sheptytskyi Raion, Lviv Oblast of Western Ukraine. It belongs to Sokal urban hromada, one of the hromadas of Ukraine.

The population of the village is about 878 people. The local government was administered by the Bobiatyn Village Council prior to the 2020 administrative reform.

== Geography ==
The village is located away from the central roads, in a flat terrain on the altitude of 207 metres (680 ft) above sea level. It is situated at a distance 98 kilometres (61 mi) from the regional center of Lviv, 15 kilometres (9.3 mi) from the city of Sokal and 28 kilometres (17 mi) from the mining city of Chervonohrad.

== History and attractions ==
The first written mention of the village, that the owner of was Jacob from Bobiatyn village, dates back to 1448. Afterwards owners of the village had been Franciszek Salezy Potocki (1700-1772) and Stanisław Szczęsny Potocki (1751-1805).

Until 18 July 2020, Bobiatyn belonged to Sokal Raion. The raion was abolished in July 2020 as part of the administrative reform of Ukraine, which reduced the number of raions of Lviv Oblast to seven. The area of Sokal Raion was merged into Chervonohrad Raion.

The Greek Catholic Church of the Holy Trinity made of stone was built in 1902 in the village.

== Notable people ==
- Kruchkevych Bogdan Volodimirovich (* 1923, Bobiatyn) – a member of the OUN.
- Mykytyuk Stepan Fedorovych (* 1922, Bobiatyn) – the conductor of the OUN.
- Stepan Khmara (* 1937, Bobiatyn) – Ukrainian politician, a longtime prisoner of the Gulag, the deputy of the Supreme Council of Ukraine of the I, II and IV term.

== Literature ==
- Історія міст і сіл УРСР : Львівська область, Сокальський район, Боб'ятин. – К. : ГРУРЕ, 1968 р. Page 748 (in Ukrainian)
