= Huta, Sheptytskyi Raion, Lviv Oblast =

Rural locality in Lviv Oblast, Ukraine

Huta Гута
- Village
- Location within Lviv Oblast Location within Ukraine
- Coordinates: 50.473°N 24.147°E
- Country: Ukraine
- Oblast: Lviv Oblast
- Raion: Sheptytskyi Raion

Huta (Ukrainian: Гута) is a village in Sheptytskyi Raion, Lviv Oblast, Ukraine. It belongs to Sokal urban hromada, one of the hromadas of Ukraine.

Until 18 July 2020, Huta belonged to Sokal Raion. The raion was abolished in July 2020 as part of the administrative reform of Ukraine, which reduced the number of raions of Lviv Oblast to seven. The area of Sokal Raion was merged into Sheptytskyi Raion, which was then known as Chervonohrad Raion.

== Demography ==
According to the 2001 census, nearly all people living in the village speak the Ukrainian language. Also according to the 2001 census, there were a total of 511 people living in the village.
