= Iryna Sekh =

Ukrainian politician (born 1970)

- Ірина Сех
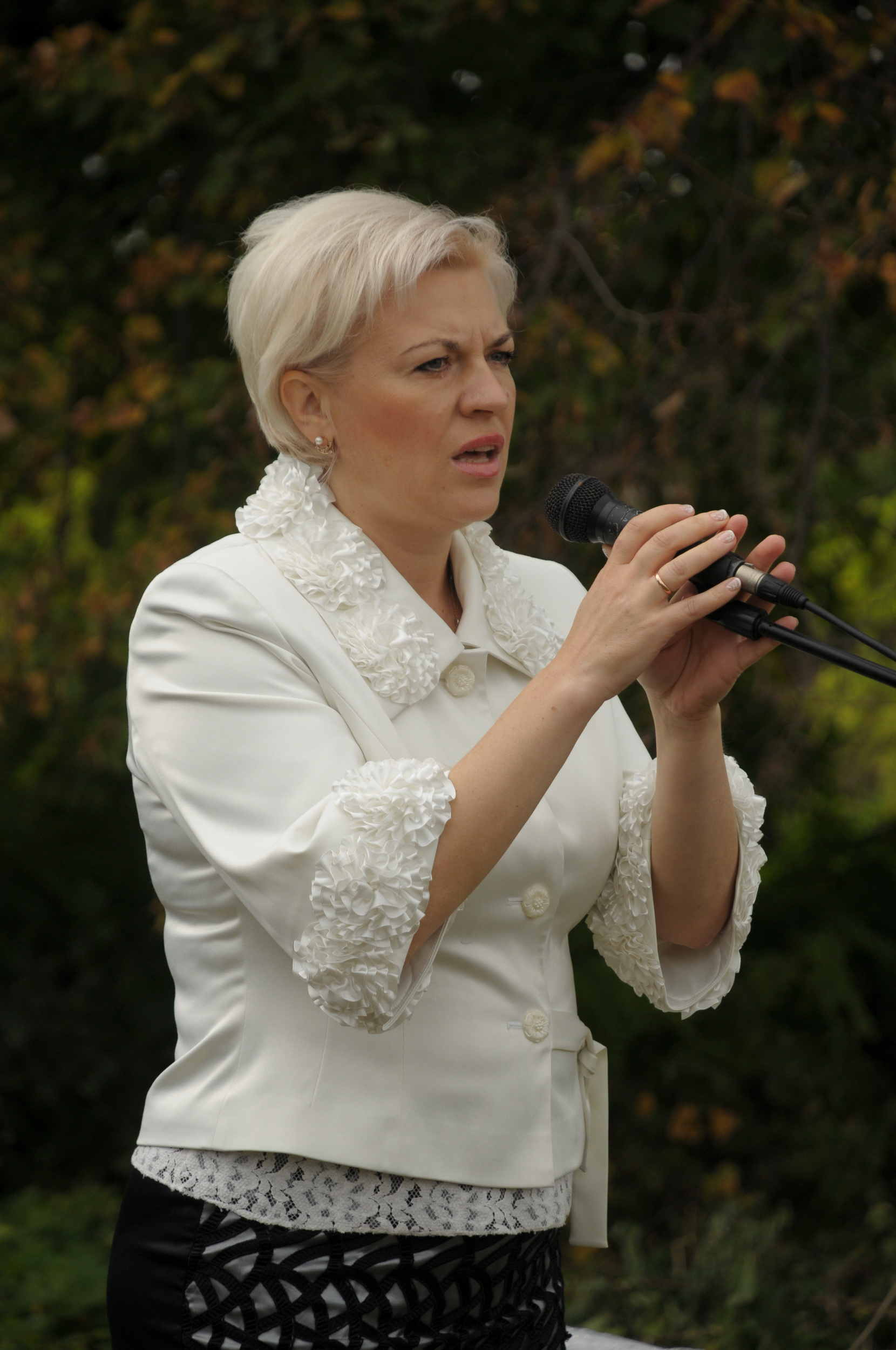

Governor of Lviv Oblast
- In office 2 March 2014 – 14 August 2014
- Preceded by: Oleh Salo
- Succeeded by: Yuriy Turyanskyi (acting)

Personal details
- Born: Iryna Ihorivna Sekh; 20 September 1970 (age 56) Verbivchyk, Brody Raion, Ukrainian SSR
- Party: Svoboda
- Education: Ternopil Pedagogical University; Lviv University

Iryna Ihorivna Sekh (Ukrainian: Ірина Ігорівна Сех) (born 20 September 1970, in Verbivchyk, Ukraine), is a Ukrainian politician, member of the Verkhovna Rada (Ukraine's parliament) from 2012 to 2014.

== Career ==
Since 2006 Sekh was a member of the Lviv Oblast council. In the 2007 Ukrainian parliamentary election she unsuccessfully ran for the party Svoboda.

In 2011 she became noticed as one of the most active members of regional council who pressured the former governor Mykhailo Tsymbalyuk to resign due to incident with celebrating the Russian Victory Day in Lviv. Tsymbalyuk had helped Russian nationalists (Russkoye Yedinstvo and Rodina) and communists from Odesa to celebrate the holiday even after the Lviv regional council had prohibited it.

In the 2012 Ukrainian parliamentary election Sekh was elected to the Verkhovna Rada (Ukraine's national parliament) in constituency 119 (in Lviv Oblast) for Svoboda. She was elected with 64.86% of the votes.

In 2014 Sekh served as a Governor of Lviv Oblast. She was appointed by acting President Oleksandr Turchynov on March 2 but on August 14 newly elected President Petro Poroshenko signed a decree dismissing Sekh from the post. Sekh combined this the positions with her membership of parliament for five months (from March 2 to August 14). In November 2014 the Lviv District Administrative Court declared that she had done so contradictory to Ukrainian law.

In the October 2014 Ukrainian parliamentary election Sekh failed to get reelected in constituency 119 for Svoboda. This time she gained 13.61% of the votes (placing 4th). The constituency was won by Mykhailo Bondar for People's Front with 26.36% of the votes.
