= Los Colorados (music group) =

Ukrainian band

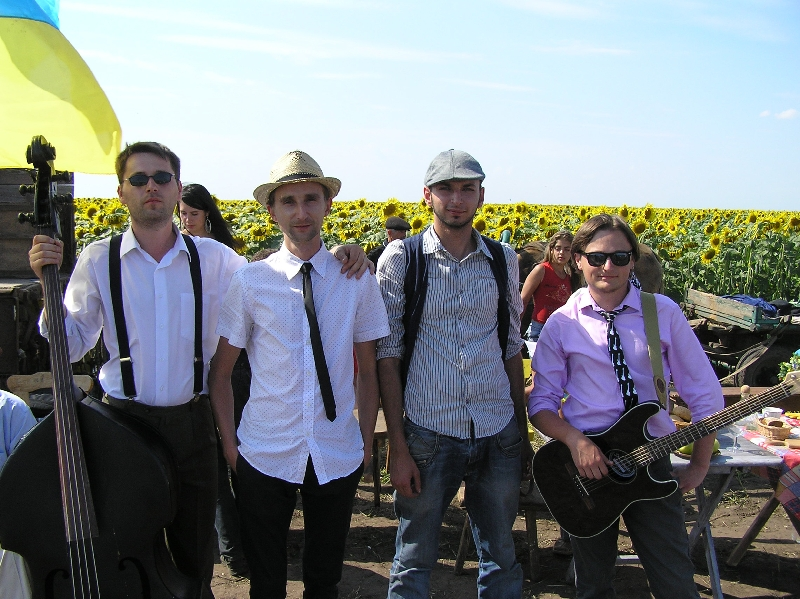
- Los Colorados in 2012

Background information
- Also known as: The Colorados
- Origin: Ternopil, Ukraine
- Genres: Rock, polka, folk
- Instruments: Electric guitar, acoustic guitar, accordion, bass guitar, drums, bass drum, tambourine, upright bass, kazoo, shakers
- Years active: 2006–present
- Members: Ruslan "Prystupnic" Prystupa; Rostyslav "Roslyk" Fook; Serhiy "Masyanya" Masyk; Oleksandr "Lesyk" Drachuk
- Past members: Alexander Drachuk

Los Colorados (from the Spanish "The colorado potato beetles"; also known as The Colorados) is a Ukrainian band formed in 2006 in Ternopil. The band plays their own songs, but have also covered several popular and folk songs. Los Colorados increased in prominence after their cover of Katy Perry's song "Hot n Cold" grew popular via online video websites. The band plays guitar, bayan, bass, and drums.

== History ==
Los Colorados performing their cover of Katy Perry's "Hot n Cold"

The band was formed in the city of Ternopil in 2006 and originally performed their own songs. However, their popularity came when they were invited to a local TV station to perform live, where they played several songs, among them Katy Perry's song "Hot n Cold". The lead singer didn't speak any English and learned the song from a text transliterated into Ukrainian letters.

The peak of popularity occurred when their version of Hot n Cold was aired on The Ellen DeGeneres Show. The video posted on YouTube in February 2009 was viewed more than 3 and a half million times and received generally positive reviews because of its comic value and unusual interpretation. Katy Perry herself described this version of her song as "inspiring" in March 2009.

During their performances members of the group present themselves as the "boys from the village of Tetylkivtsi", a real village (population — 636); however, in reality, most of the performers come from the city of Ternopil.

In 2012, they came to fame in Germany. The major TV broadcaster ZDF had selected them to create an official song for the UEFA Euro 2012 football games. It was a cover of the song "I Like to Move It" and quickly gained popularity after it was presented in May 2012. They recorded more cover songs in Berlin, with an album published in June 2012. One of those cover songs had been Rammstein's "Du hast", which became a major success in social networks, eventually surpassing the "Hot and Cold" cover (5 million views on YouTube by 2019).

== Band members ==
Current members

- Ruslan "Prystupnic" Prystupa – lead vocals, accordion (2006–present)
- Rostyslav "Roslyk" Fook – guitars, kazoo, backing and occasional lead vocals (2006–present)
- Serhiy "Masyanya" Masyk – bass guitar, upright bass, backing vocals (2006–present)
- Oleksandr "Lesyk" Drachuk – drums, percussion backing vocals (2016–present)

Former members

- Alexander Drachuk – drums, percussion backing vocals (2006–2016)

== List of songs ==
- Haryachyi i kholodnyi (Гарячий і холодний; cover of "Hot n Cold" by Katy Perry)
- Du Hast (cover of "Du Hast" by Rammstein)
- Bayan, bayan (Баян, баян; cover of Gitar by Peter Nalitch)
- Pamidory (Помідори) (Tomatoes)
- Kokhana (Кохана) (Darling)
- Korova zdokhla (Корова здохла) (A cow died)
- Paskuda (Паскуда) (Scum)
- Nenavyzhu pianino (Ненавижу піаніно) (I hate piano)
- Tyotya Lyuba (Тьотя Люба) (Aunt Lyuba)
- Rillya v ilyuminatori (Рілля в ілюмінаторі) (Arable land in the porthole)
- Rover Ukrayina (Ровер Україна) (Bike "Ukrayina")
- Chorna lyubov (Чорна любов) (Black love)
- Fihurka (Фігурка) (Figure)
- Ranetki (Ранетки)
- Chempioni lyubvi (Чемпионы любви) (Champions of love)
- Seven Nation Army (cover of "Seven Nation Army" by The White Stripes)

== Move It ==
Move It

Studio album by Los Colorados
- Released: 1 June 2012
- Recorded: Berlin, Germany
- Genre: Polka
- Length: 37:58
- Label: Motor Music

=== Track listing ===
No.	Title	Length
1.	"Hot n Cold" (covering single by Katy Perry)	3:41
2.	"I Like to Move It" (covering single by Reel 2 Real)	2:46
3.	"Du hast" (covering single by Rammstein)	3:50
4.	"Indie Boy"	2:52
5.	"Be My Lover" (covering single by La Bouche)	3:47
6.	"Tik Tok" (covering single by Kesha)	2:49
7.	"Let It Be" (covering single by The Beatles)	3:40
8.	"Besame"	3:15
9.	"U Can't Touch This" (covering single by MC Hammer)	2:37
10.	"I Love Rock 'n' Roll" (covering single by Joan Jett)	2:40
11.	"My Sweet Mila"	3:00
12.	"The Passenger" (covering single by Iggy Pop)	3:01
Total length:		37:58

iTunes bonus tracks
No.	Title	Length
13.	"Sex on Fire" (covering single by Kings of Leon)
