= Leopold Buczkowski =

Polish writer, poet, painter, graphic artist and sculptor

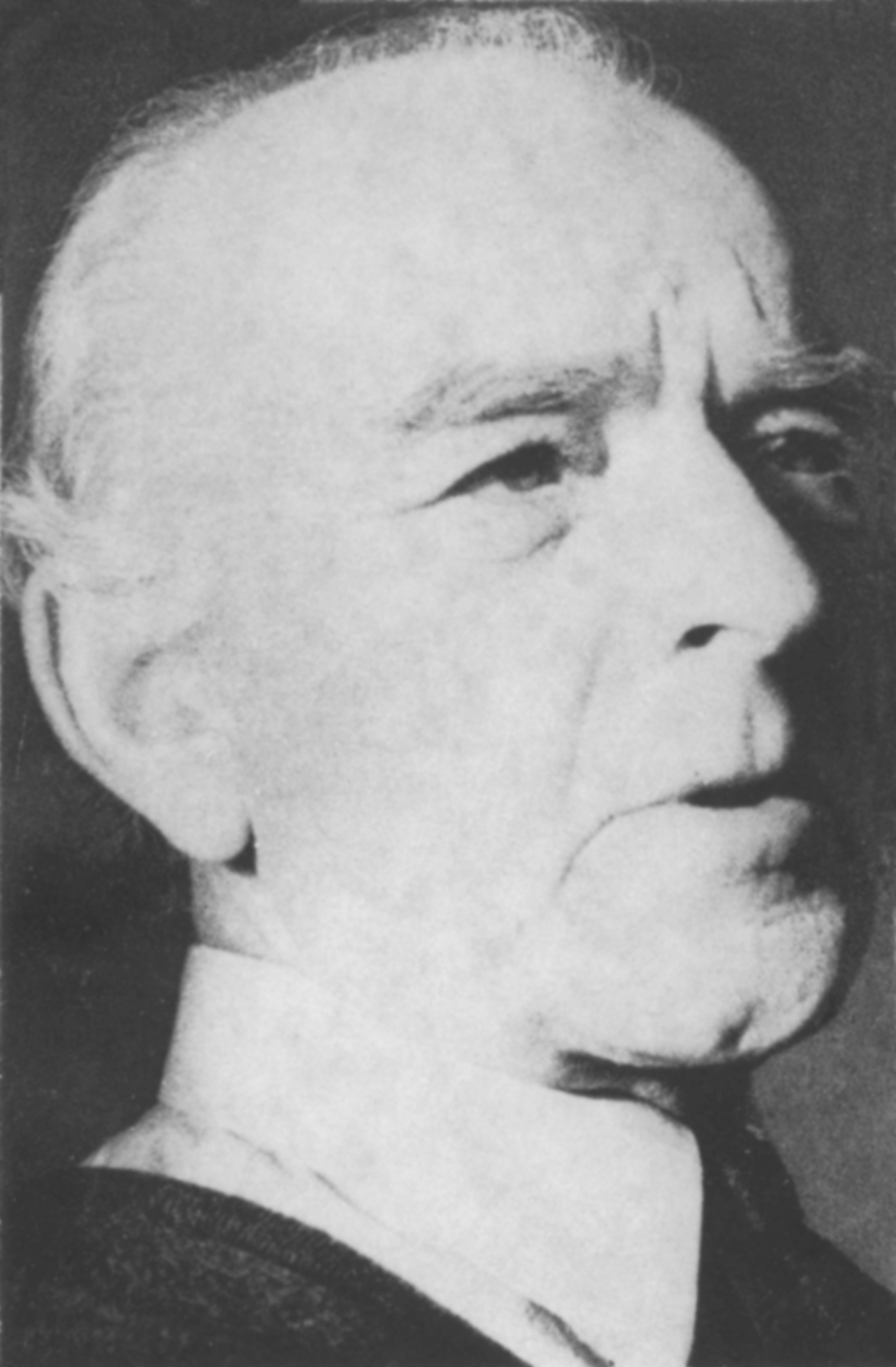
- Leopold Buczkowski
- Born: November 15, 1905; Nakwasza, Austrian Empire
- Died: April 27, 1989 (aged 83); Warsaw, Poland
- Education: Jagiellonian University; Academy of Fine Arts in Warsaw
- Occupations: Writer, poet, painter, sculptor
- Writing career
- Pen name: Paweł Makutra

Leopold Buczkowski (November 15, 1905 – April 27, 1989) was a Polish writer, poet, painter, graphic artist and sculptor.

== Biography ==
Leopold Buczkowski was born on November 15, 1905, in Nakwasza, located in the former Austrian Empire, though now Nakvasha in Ukraine. He was the son of Tomasz Buczkowski and Anna Zając. From early childhood, he demonstrated some form of artistic talent. This was hindered by the difficult conditions of life in his hometown. From 1914 he lived in Podkamień, where he worked as a stone-cutter and sculptor in the 1930s. Buczkowski studied Polish Literature at Jagiellonian University in Kraków. He was also a free listener at the Academy of Fine Arts in Warsaw, where he studied painting under the tutorship of Julian Fałat.

At the outbreak of World War II, Buczkowski enlisted to defend Poland from Nazi forces in the so-called September Campaign. He became a POW, after which he lived in Lviv. In 1944, he survived the Pidkamin massacre, while his two brothers died. These events forced his family to relocate to Warsaw. He took part in the Warsaw Uprising.

After the war, Buczkowski settled in Kraków, where he worked as a book illustrator. From 1950 up until his death he lived in Konstancin, near Warsaw. In 1982 he became a member of the Patriotic Movement for National Rebirth. His grave is located at the cemetery in Skolimów.

He was awarded the Order of Polonia Restituta by the government in 1956.

== Writing ==
One of his poems was published in 'Gazeta Polska' in 1929 under a pseudonym. He officially debuted in 1936. Buczkowski ran an amateur theatre, for which he wrote Zabójstwo, a play. His first novel, Wertepy, was seized by the police because of its harsh portrayal of life in poverty-stricken Volhynia (now part of Ukraine). Buczkowski wrote his second novel, Black Torrent in 1946. In 1953, he began to paint more frequently and display his works in Warsaw. Works such as Black Torrent (Czarny potok), Dorycki krużganek, Młody poeta w zamku and Pierwsza świetność all reference the terror of the Nazi occupation of Poland and World War II. Buczkowski's prose is characterised as experimental and original for its disregard of the traditional rules of storytelling and dialogue. The author considered Kąpiele w Lucca, a novel published in 1974, as his greatest work and regarded some of his later works as its supplements.

== Works ==
- Wertepy (1947)
- Czarny potok (1954, trans. as Black Torrent by David Welsh, 1970)
- Dorycki krużganek (1957)
- Młody poeta w zamku (1959)
- Pierwsza świetność (1978)
- Uroda na czasie (1981)
- Kąpiele w Lucca (1974)
- Oficer na nieszporach (1975)
- Kamień w pieluszkach (1978)
- Wszystko jest dialogiem (1984)
- Na nowo i poniekąd inaczej (1985)
- Proza żywa (1986)
- Żywe dialogi (1989)
- Dziennik wojenny (2001)
- Powstanie na Żoliborzu (2004)
