= Variazh =

Village in Lviv Oblast, Ukraine

Variazh Варяж
- Village
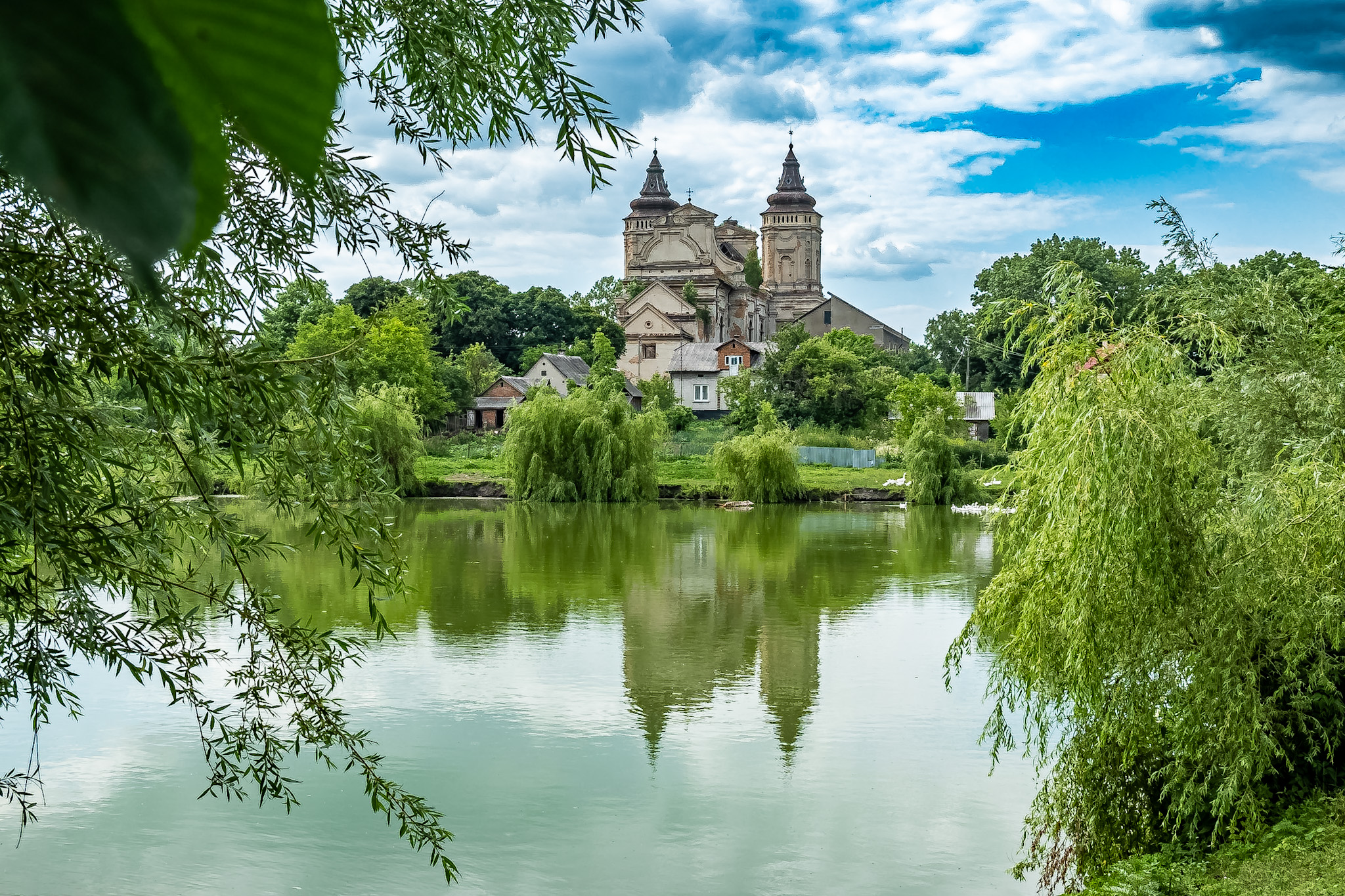
- St. Mark's Church

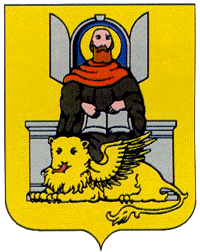
- Coat of arms
- Interactive map of Variazh
- Location of Variazh in Ukraine Variazh (Ukraine)
- Coordinates: 50°31′01″N 24°05′33″E
- Country: Ukraine
- Oblast: Lviv Oblast
- Raion: Sheptytskyi Raion
- Hromada: Sokal urban hromada
- First mentioned: 1419
- Magdeburg rights: 1538

Government
  - Village Head: Yuriy Horodko (NRU)

Area
  - Total: 2.17 km^{2} (0.84 sq mi)
- Elevation: 202 m (663 ft)

Population (2024)
  - Total: 825
  - Density: 380/km^{2} (985/sq mi)
- Time zone: UTC+2 (EET)
  - Summer (DST): UTC+3 (EEST)
- Postal code: 80014
- Area code: +380 3257
- Website: http://rada.gov.ua/

Variazh (Ukrainian: Варяж; Polish: Waręż) is a village (former town) in Sheptytskyi Raion (district) of Lviv Oblast (province) in western Ukraine. Its population is 825 as of the 2024 Census. The village is located close to the border with Poland, near the Polish village of Uśmierz. It belongs to Sokal urban hromada, one of the hromadas of Ukraine.

== History ==
The first written documents date the settlement back to in 1419 as Waręż. In 1538, the settlement was granted the Magdeburg rights. It formed part of the Kingdom of Poland until the First Partition of Poland in 1772, when it was annexed by Austria.

Waręż had a significant population of Jews living in the city: in 1880, there were 880 Jews; in 1900, there were 964 Jews; in 1921, there were 520 Jews.

Following the restoration of independent Poland, Waręż was a part of the Polish Lwów Voivodeship (Sokal County) and – since 1934 – seat of the Gmina Waręż, a rural administrative district of Poland (Waręż does not appear on lists of towns since at least 1931, and prior to this it only had market town status (miasteczko), which was considered a rural unit in an administrative sense).

Following the joint German-Soviet invasion of Poland, which started World War II in September 1939, the town was occupied by the Germany until 1944. During the Holocaust, Waręż's entire Jewish population was killed.

During the war, the settlement became a part of the Hrubieszów County, which after the war returned to the Lublin Voivodeship. During the 1951 Polish–Soviet territorial exchange, Waręż along with most of the pre-war Sokal County was transferred from the People's Republic of Poland to the Ukrainian Soviet Socialist Republic. There, the settlement was renamed to Novoukrainka (Ukrainian: Новоукраїнка), a name which it kept until 1989 when it was reverted to its original—albeit Ukrainian variant of the name, Variazh.

Until 18 July 2020, Variazh belonged to Sokal Raion. The raion was abolished in July 2020 as part of the administrative reform of Ukraine, which reduced the number of raions of Lviv Oblast to seven. The area of Sokal Raion was merged into Chervonohrad Raion (currently Sheptytskyi Raion).

== People from Variazh ==
- Liubomyr Medvid (born 1941), Ukrainian painter
- Yaroslav Mendus (born 1960), Ukrainian politician

== See also ==
- St. Mark's Church, Variazh
