= Markopil =

Rural locality in Lviv Oblast, Ukraine

- Village
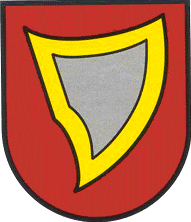
- Coat of arms

- Location within Ukraine
- Coordinates: 49°51′40″N 25°16′57″E
- Country: Ukraine
- Oblast: Lviv
- Raion: Zolochiv
- Area: 1.21 km^{2} (0.47 sq mi)
- Population: 703
  - Density: 580/km^{2} (1,500/sq mi)

Markopil (Ukrainian: Маркопіль) is a village (selo) in Zolochiv Raion, Lviv Oblast, in western Ukraine. It belongs to Pidkamin settlement hromada, one of the hromadas of Ukraine.

From 1918 to 1939 the village was in Tarnopol Voivodeship in Poland. In 1921 the village had 1111 inhabitants.

Until 18 July 2020, Markopil belonged to Brody Raion. The raion was abolished in July 2020 as part of the administrative reform of Ukraine, which reduced the number of raions of Lviv Oblast to seven. The area of Brody Raion was merged into Zolochiv Raion.
