= Pidkamin settlement hromada =

Hromada in Lviv Oblast, Ukraine

Pidkamin settlement hromada Підкамінська селищна громада
- Hromada
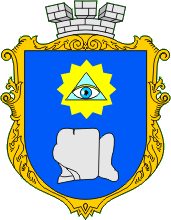
- Seal
- Interactive map of Pidkamin settlement hromada
- Country: Ukraine
- Oblast: Lviv Oblast
- Raion: Zolochiv Raion
- Admin. center: Pidkamin

Area
  - Total: 3,188 km^{2} (1,231 sq mi)

Population (2021)
  - Total: 11,186
  - Density: 3.509/km^{2} (9.088/sq mi)
- CATOTTG code: UA46040110000093394
- Settlements: 33
- Rural settlements: 1
- Villages: 32
- Website: pidkaminska-gromada.gov.ua

Pidkamin settlement hromada (Ukrainian: Підкамінська селищна громада) is a hromada in Ukraine, in Zolochiv Raion of Lviv Oblast. The administrative center is the rural settlement of Pidkamin.

== Settlements ==
The hromada consists of 1 rural settlement (Pidkamin) and 32 villages:

- Batkiv
- Verbivchyk
- Holubytsia
- Horbanivka
- Dudyn
- Zharkiv
- Zalissia
- Zvyzhen
- Kutyshche
- Litovyshche
- Lukavets
- Lukashi
- Malynyshche
- Markopil
- Mezhyhory
- Mykyty
- Nakvasha
- Nemiach
- Orykhivchyk
- Palykorovy
- Pankivtsi
- Peniaky
- Popivtsi
- Styborivka
- Strykhaliuky
- Tetylkivtsi
- Chepeli
- Chernytsia
- Shyshkivtsi
- Shpaky
- Yablunivka
- Yasnyshche
