= Styborivka =

Rural locality in Lviv Oblast, Ukraine

Styborivka, Ukraine
- Village
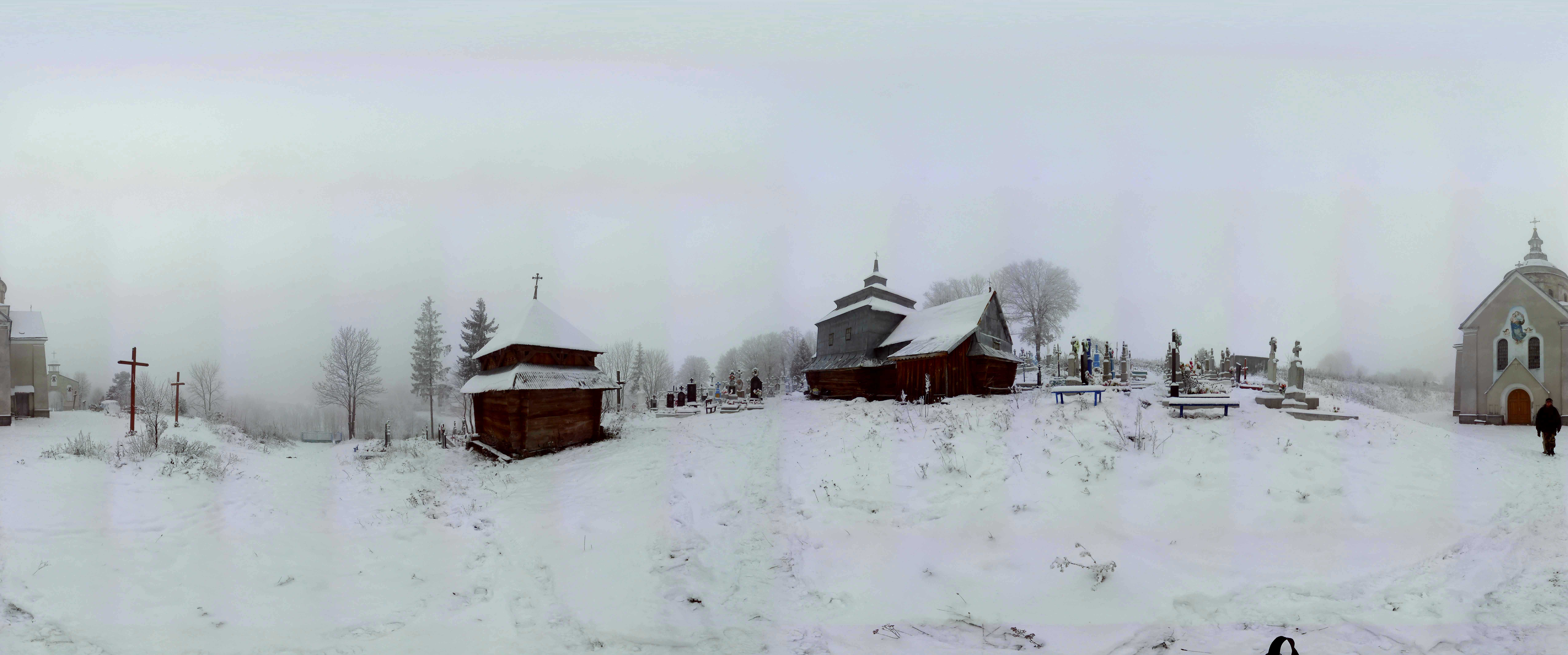
- Church of Nativity of the Theotokos

- Location within Lviv Oblast Location within Ukraine
- Coordinates: 49°53′57″N 25°18′50″E
- Country: Ukraine
- Oblast: Lviv
- Raion: Zolochiv
- Area: 0.918 km^{2} (0.354 sq mi)
- Population: 419
  - Density: 456/km^{2} (1,180/sq mi)

Styborivka (Ukrainian: Стиборівка) is a village (selo) in Zolochiv Raion, Lviv Oblast, in western Ukraine. It belongs to Pidkamin settlement hromada, one of the hromadas of Ukraine.

From the years 1918 to 1939 the village was deemed to lie in Tarnopol Voivodeship in Poland.

Until 18 July 2020, Styborivka belonged to Brody Raion. The raion was abolished in July 2020 as part of the administrative reform of Ukraine, which reduced the number of raions of Lviv Oblast to seven. The area of Brody Raion was merged into Zolochiv Raion.
