= Nemiach =

Rural locality in Lviv Oblast, Ukraine

Coordinates: 49°55′48″N 25°22′12″E

- Village
- Interactive map of Nemiach
- Country: Ukraine
- Oblast: Lviv
- Raion: Zolochiv Raion
- Area: 1.833 km^{2} (0.708 sq mi)
- Population: 565
  - Density: 308/km^{2} (800/sq mi)

Nemiach (Ukrainian: Нем'яч, Polish: Niemiacz) is a small village (selo) in Zolochiv Raion, Lviv Oblast, in western Ukraine. It belongs to Pidkamin settlement hromada, one of the hromadas of Ukraine.

From 1918 to 1945, the village was in the Tarnopol Voivodeship, Poland.

Until 18 July 2020, Nemiach belonged to Brody Raion. The raion was abolished in July 2020 as part of the administrative reform of Ukraine, which reduced the number of raions of Lviv Oblast to seven. The area of Brody Raion was merged into Zolochiv Raion.

The village is located next to the urban-type settlement of Pidkamin and is its suburb since the 15th century.
