= Yaroslav Mendus =

Ukrainian politician

Yaroslav Petrovych Mendus
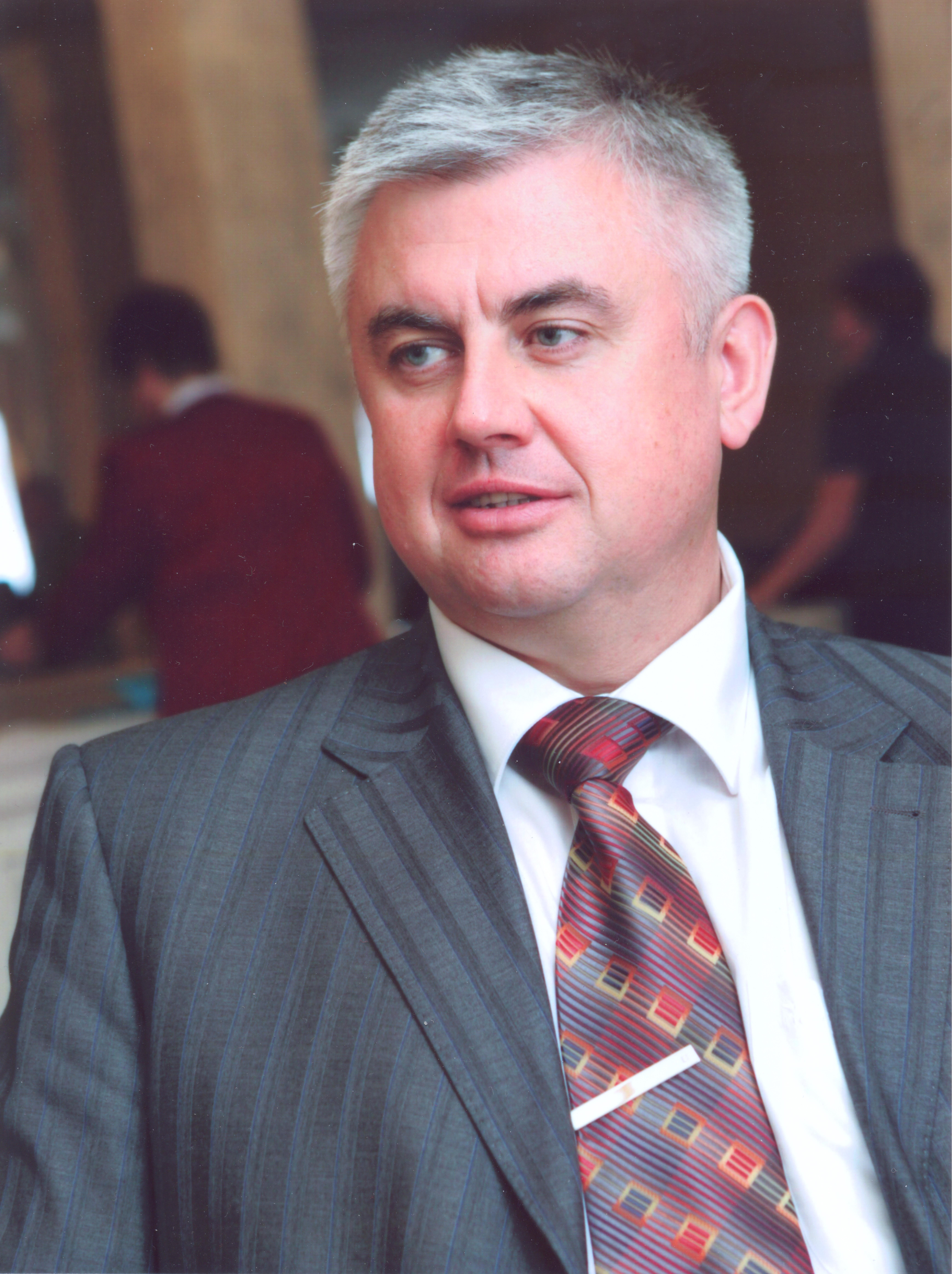

Political Advisor to the Vice-President of the European Parliament
- Incumbent
- Assumed office 15 November 2014

Personal details
- Born: Variazh, Ukraine

Yaroslav Petrovych Mendus (born 1 January 1960; in Variazh, Lviv Oblast), is a Ukrainian politician. He currently works as Political Advisor to the Vice-President of the European Parliament.

== Education ==
Yaroslav Mendus graduated from Lviv University in 1981, receiving a Diploma with Honours in History. He finished at the Kyiv Institute of Political Science and Social Administration in 1988 and defended his PhD thesis in History in 1999.

== Career ==
Yaroslav Mendus worked in the Administration of the first President of Ukraine, Leonid Kravchuk. He then worked as Advisor to Oleksandr Moroz (Chairman of the Verkhovna Rada); he was an MP in the 5th Assembly of the Verkhovna Rada; and later worked as Political Advisor to Member of the European Parliament, Marek Siwiec; then as Political Advisor to the Vice-Chair of the Committee on Foreign Affairs in the European Parliament, Ioan Mircea Pascu.

Yaroslav Mendus now works as Political Advisor to the Vice-President of the European Parliament.

Yaroslav Mendus was General Producer of the movie The Orange Sky – a love story, set against the backdrop of the 2004–5 Orange Revolution. In 2004 he founded web-based media "Censor.net". He is author of a collection of essays, A to Z of Ukrainian Politics; and has published many articles on contemporary Ukrainian political life.
