= Peniaky =

Rural locality in Lviv Oblast, Ukraine

- Village
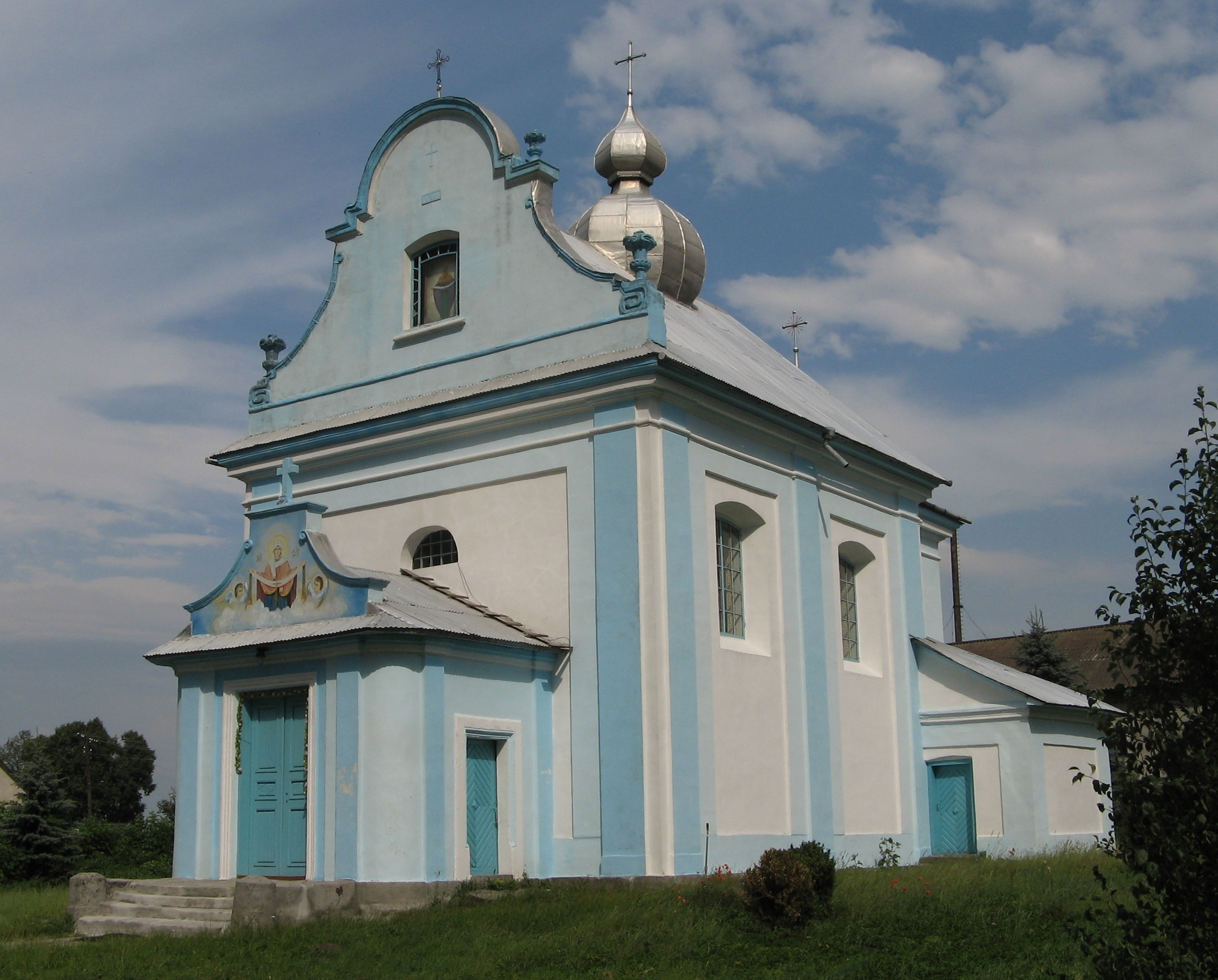
- Church of the Intercession of the Blessed Virgin Mary in Penyaki (2007)

- Location within Ukraine Location within Lviv Oblast
- Coordinates: 49°53′42″N 25°11′13″E
- Country: Ukraine
- Oblast: Lviv
- Raion: Zolochiv Raion
- Area: 1.642 km^{2} (0.634 sq mi)
- Population: 622
  - Density: 378/km^{2} (980/sq mi)

Peniaky (Ukrainian: Пеняки, Polish: Pieniaki) is a village (selo) situated in Zolochiv Raion, Lviv Oblast, in western Ukraine. It belongs to Pidkamin settlement hromada, one of the hromadas of Ukraine.

From 23 December 1920 to 1939 the village was in Tarnopol Voivodeship in Poland.

Until 18 July 2020, Peniaky belonged to Brody Raion. The raion was abolished in July 2020 as part of the administrative reform of Ukraine, which reduced the number of raions of Lviv Oblast to seven. The area of Brody Raion was merged into Zolochiv Raion.
