= Pavlovychi, Sokal Raion =

Former village in Lviv Oblast, Ukraine

Pavlovychi (Ukrainian: Павловичі, Polish: Pawłowice) was a village in Ukraine. It is located in Sheptytskyi Raion, Lviv Oblast. It was annexed by the Soviet Union in 1951 due to the Polish-Soviet territorial exchange and joined the Ukrainian Soviet Socialist Republic.

== History ==
Per the Polish census of 1921, the village had population of 268, with 250 Orthodox Christians, 17 Roman Catholics and 1 Greek Catholics; 188 Ukrainians and 80 Poles.

On July 29, 1929, Polish authorities destroyed local Orthodox church.

Until February 15, 1951, Pavlovychi was located in the Dolhobyczów municipality, Hrubieszów County, Lublin Voivodeship. In 1951 – as one of two small slices of the Dołhobyczów municipality (the other was the area around Piaseczno) – it was annexed to the Soviet Union as part of the 1951 border swap agreement. This was the only part of the pre-1939 Lublin voivodeship that became part of the USSR; the other Lublin municipalities that changed state in 1951 belonged during the Second Republic to the Lviv voivodeship (to the districts of Sokal and Rawsk).
