= Sokal urban hromada =

Hromada in Lviv Oblast, Ukraine

Sokal urban hromada Сокальська міська громада
- Hromada
- Seal
- Interactive map of Sokal urban hromada
- Country: Ukraine
- Oblast: Lviv Oblast
- Raion: Sheptytskyi Raion
- Admin. center: Sokal

Area
  - Total: 6,837 km^{2} (2,640 sq mi)

Population (2015)
  - Total: 52,574
  - Density: 7.690/km^{2} (19.92/sq mi)
- CATOTTG code: UA46120110000062257
- Settlements: 60
- Cities: 1
- Rural settlements: 1
- Villages: 58
- Website: sokal-rada.gov.ua

Sokal urban hromada (Ukrainian: Сокальська міська громада) is a hromada in Ukraine, in Sheptytskyi Raion of Lviv Oblast. The administrative center is the city of Sokal.

== Settlements ==
The hromada consists of 1 city (Sokal), rural settlement (Zhvyrka) and 58 villages:

- Borok
- Bobiatyn
- Bodiachiv
- Boianychi
- Variazh
- Velyke
- Voislavychi
- Volytsia
- Hanivka
- Hatkivka
- Horbkiv
- Huta
- Zabuzhzhia
- Zavyshen
- Zalyzhnia
- Zubkiv
- Ilkovychi
- Kniazhe
- Komariv
- Konotopy
- Kopytiv
- Leshkiv
- Leshchativ
- Lubnivka
- Luchytsi
- Mativ
- Nynovychi
- Nismychi
- Opilsko
- Perviatychi
- Perespa
- Peretoky
- Pisochne
- Potorytsia
- Ravshchyna
- Romanivka
- Romosh
- Roiatyn
- Rusyn
- Savchyn
- Svytaziv
- Skomorokhy
- Smykiv
- Spasiv
- Starhorod
- Steniatyn
- Sukhovolia
- Tartakiv
- Teliazh
- Trudoliubivka
- Tudorkovychi
- Uhryniv
- Ulvivok
- Fusiv
- Khorobriv
- Sharpantsi
- Shykhtari
- Shpykolosy
