= St. Mark's Church, Variazh =

Church building in Variazh, Ukraine

Coordinates: 50°31′01″N 24°05′28″E

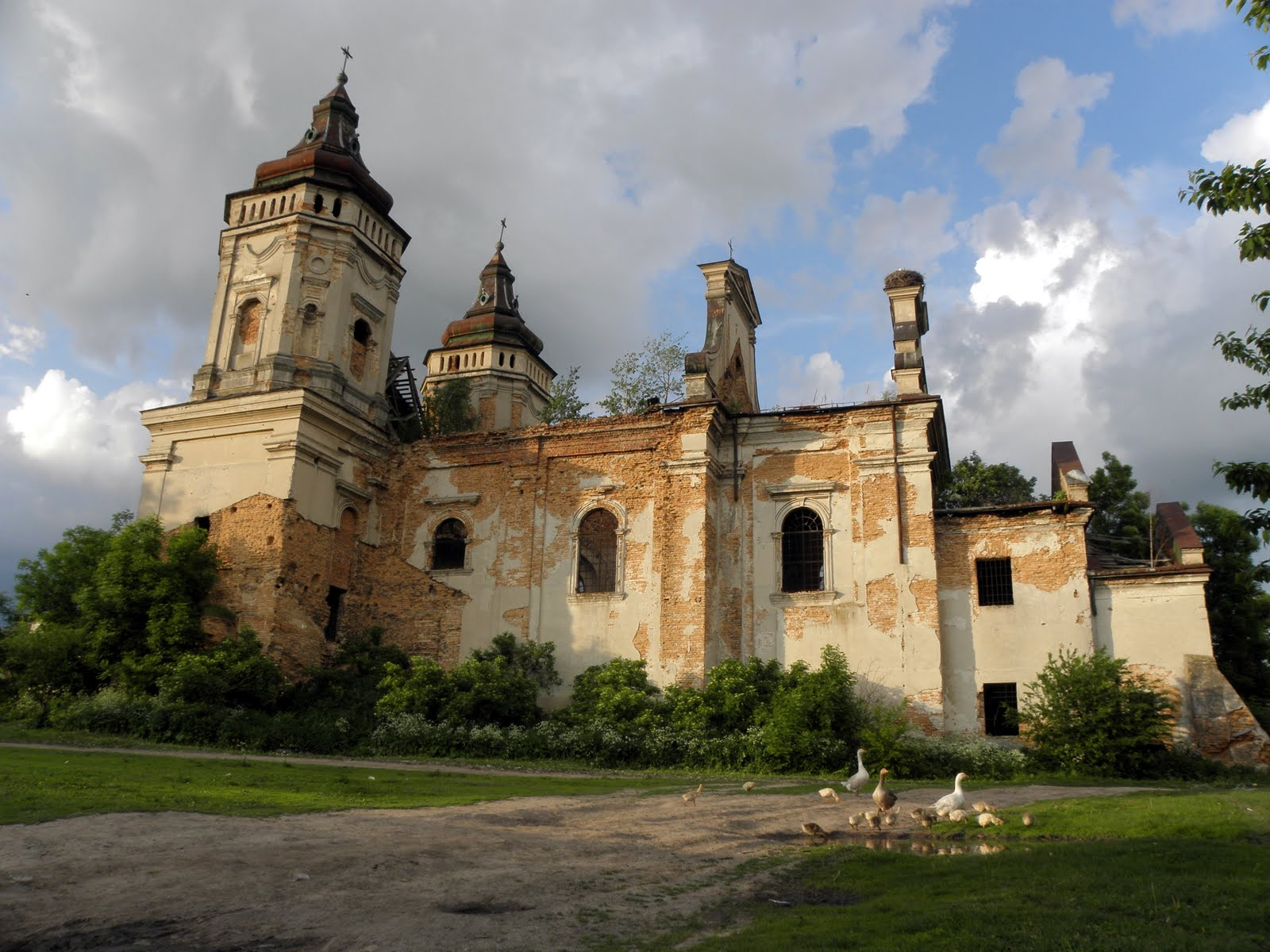
Side view of the partially destroyed early Baroque style church in Variazh in Lviv Oblast.

St. Mark's Church (Ukrainian: Костел святого Марка; Polish: Kościół św. Marka) is a partially destroyed Roman Catholic church in the former city of Variazh (Waręż), in Lviv Oblast of western Ukraine. It was designed in the early Baroque style by Wojciech Lentarowicz and built during 1688-1693.

A fire in 1796 burned down the church's two towers; they were rebuilt afterwards, but were lower than they were originally.

Inside the church are the remnants of fresco work dating back to the second half of the 18th century.
