= Zhvyrka =

Rural locality in Lviv Oblast, Ukraine

Zhvyrka Жвирка
- Rural settlement
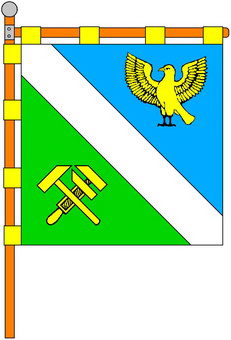
- Flag Coat of arms

- Location in Lviv Oblast Location in Ukraine
- Coordinates: 50°27′54″N 24°15′48″E
- Country: Ukraine
- Oblast: Lviv Oblast
- Raion: Chervonohrad Raion
- Hromada: Sokal urban hromada

Population (2022)
  - Total: 3,612
- Time zone: UTC+2 (EET)
  - Summer (DST): UTC+3 (EEST)

Zhvyrka (Ukrainian: Жвирка) is a rural settlement in Chervonohrad Raion of Lviv Oblast in Ukraine. It is located on the left bank of the Western Bug. Zhvyrka belongs to Sokal urban hromada, one of the hromadas of Ukraine. Population: 3,612 (2022 estimate).

== History ==
Until 18 July 2020, Zhvyrka belonged to Sokal Raion. The raion was abolished in July 2020 as part of the administrative reform of Ukraine, which reduced the number of raions of Lviv Oblast to seven. The area of Sokal Raion was merged into Chervonohrad Raion.

Until 26 January 2024, Zhvyrka was designated urban-type settlement. On this day, a new law entered into force which abolished this status, and Zhvyrka became a rural settlement.

== Economy ==
=== Transportation ===
Sokal railway station is located in Zhvyrka, on a railway which connects Lviv via Chervonohrad with Volodymyr.

The settlement is connected by road with Chervonohrad, where it have further access to Lviv via Zhovkva.
