= Sokal Raion =

Former subdivision of Lviv Oblast, Ukraine

Sokal Raion Сокальський район
- Raion
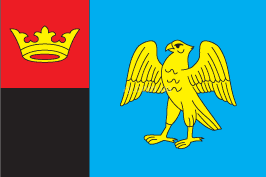
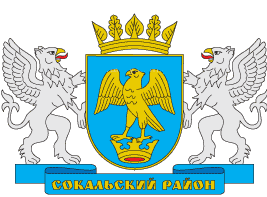
- Flag Coat of arms

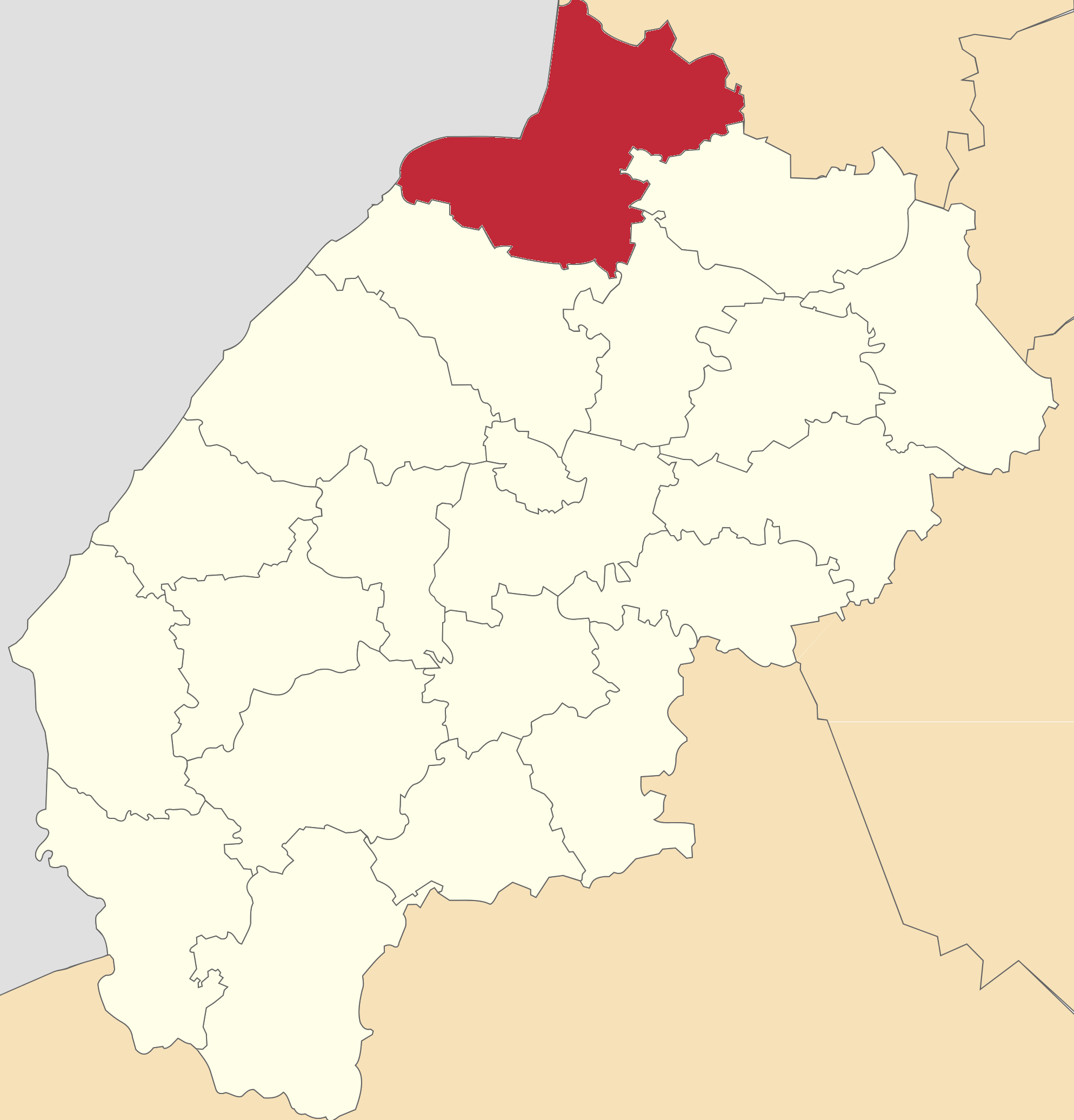
- Coordinates: 50°23′08″N 24°06′14″E
- Country: Ukraine
- Oblast: Lviv Oblast
- Established: 1939
- Disestablished: 18 July 2020
- Admin. center: Sokal
- Subdivisions: List: — city councils; — settlement councils; — rural councils; Number of localities: — cities; — urban-type settlements; 101 — villages; — rural settlements

Government
  - Governor: Mykola Mysak

Area
  - Total: 1,573 km^{2} (607 sq mi)

Population (2020)
  - Total: 101,748
  - Density: 64.68/km^{2} (167.5/sq mi)
- Time zone: UTC+02:00 (EET)
  - Summer (DST): UTC+03:00 (EEST)
- Postal index: 80000—80086
- Area code: 380-3257
- Website: www.sokal-rda.gov.ua

Sokal Raion (Ukrainian: Сокальський район, Sokal's'kyj rajon) was a raion (district) of Lviv Oblast (region) in western Ukraine. Its administrative center was the city of Sokal. It had a population of 98,123 in the 2001 Ukrainian Census. The raion was abolished on 18 July 2020 as part of the administrative reform of Ukraine, which reduced the number of raions of Lviv Oblast to seven. The area of Sokal Raion was merged into Chervonohrad Raion. The last estimate of the raion population was 101,748 (2020 est.).

The Sokal Raion had a total of 106 populated settlements. Five were cities subordinate to the raion administration: Belz, Sokal, Sosnivka, Uhniv, and Velyki Mosty. One, Zhvyrka, was an urban-type settlement, and were 101 villages.

The raion bordered Poland to the west, Volyn Oblast to the north, and Lviv Oblast's Radekhiv Raion to the east, and Kamianka-Buzka and Zhovkva Raions to the south.

The raion was established in 1939 with the annexation of Western Ukraine to the Ukrainian Soviet Socialist Republic. In 1951, the raion's administration was expanded to include territories ceded from the Lublin Voivodeship of the People's Republic of Poland during the 1951 Polish–Soviet territorial exchange. During the transfer, the cities of Bełz, Uhnów, Krystynopol, and Waręż were transferred to Ukraine. Also Pawłowice village was placed in the Ukrainian territory after that exchange Until June 2019, Sosnivka was administratively subordinated to the city of Chervonohrad, and then transferred to Sokal Raion.

At the time of disestablishment, the raion consisted of three hromadas:

- Belz urban hromada with the administration in the city of Belz;
- Sokal urban hromada with the administration in Sokal;
- Velyki Mosty urban hromada with the administration in the city of Velyki Mosty.
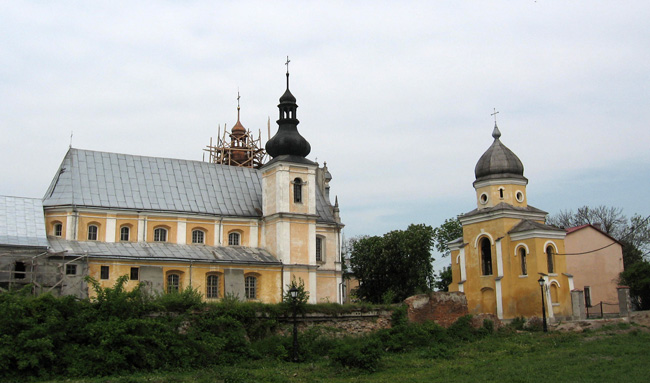
St. Nicholas Greek Catholic Church in Belz.

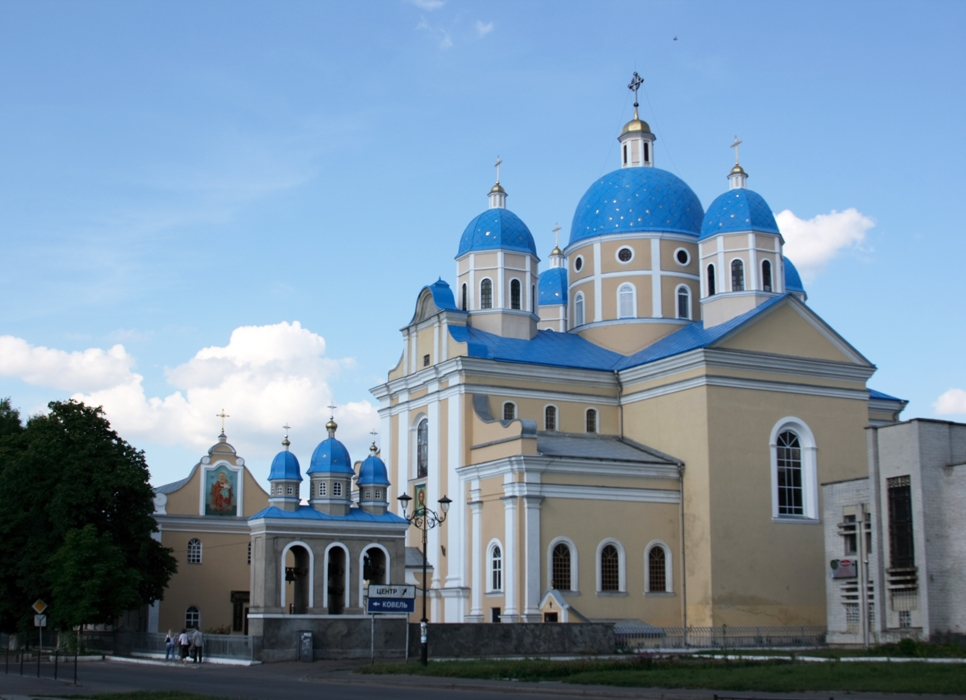
Holy Spirit Church in Chervonohrad, ca. 1750s.

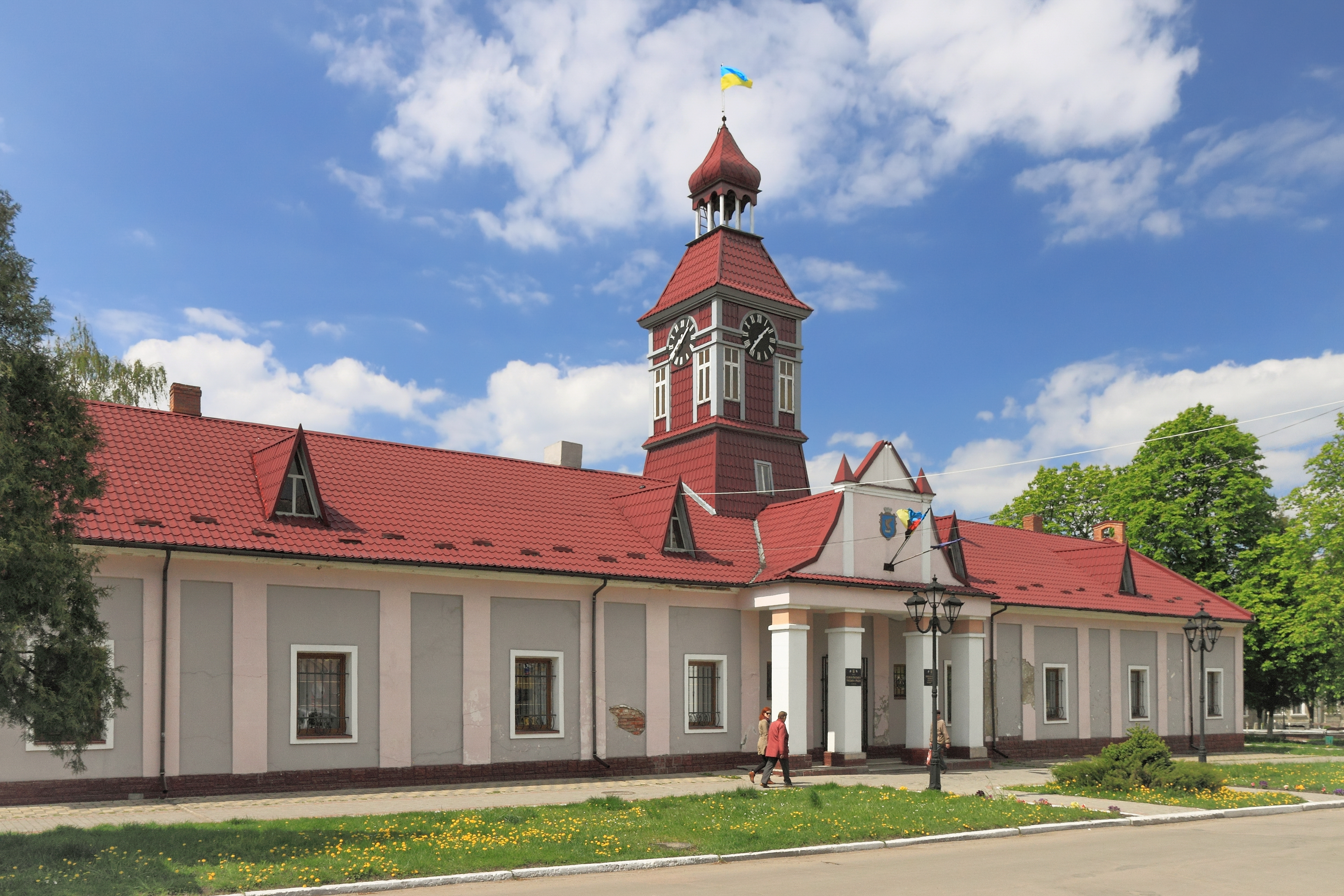
The city hall in Sokal.

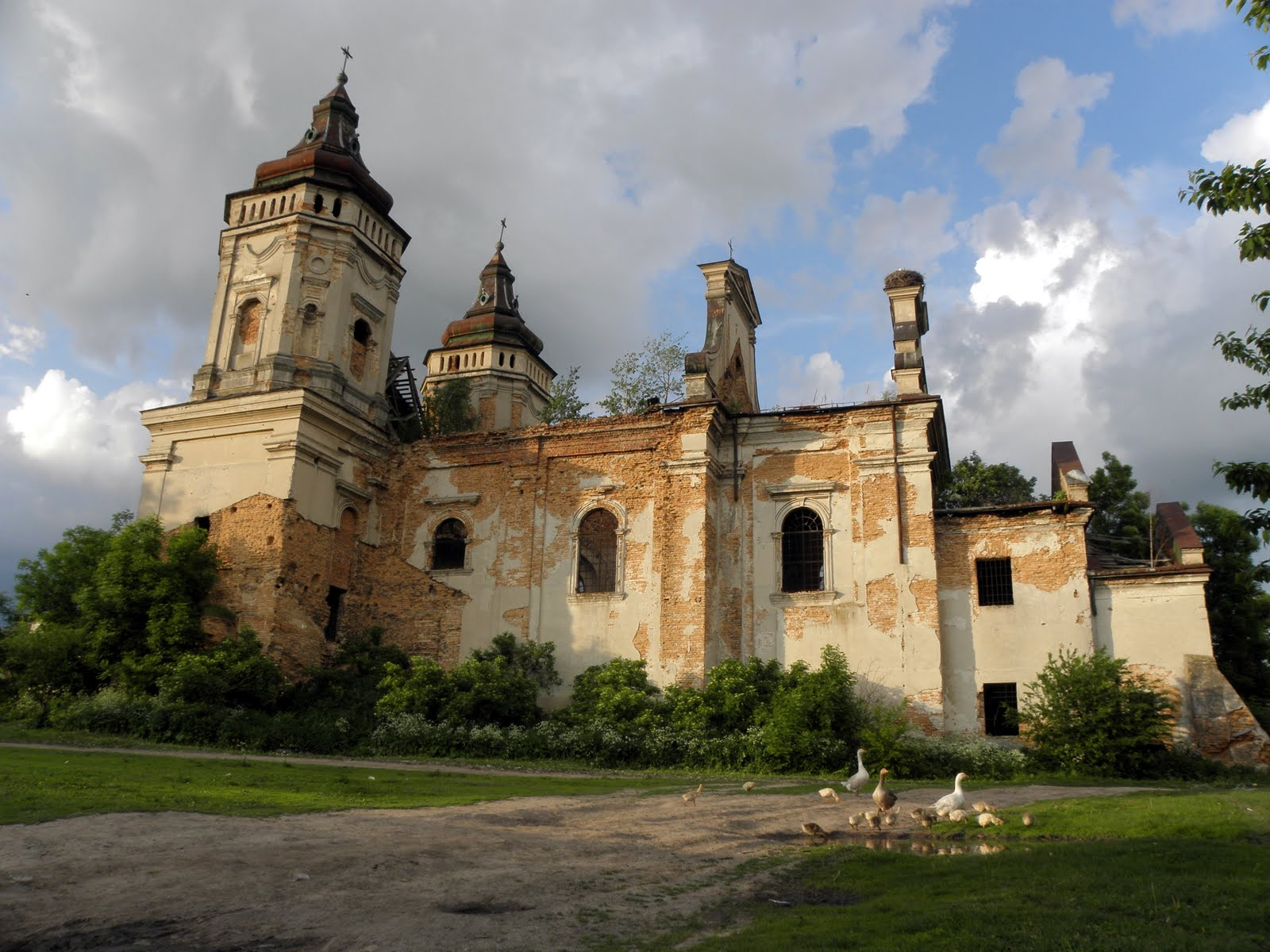
St. Mark's Church in Variazh.

== See also ==
- Bieszczady County, Poland, which acquired the Ukrainian territories during the 1951 exchange
