= Syhlovate =

Syhlovate Сигловате
- Village
- Location within Lviv Oblast
- Coordinates: 48°58′44″N 22°57′12″E
- Country: Ukraine
- Oblast: Lviv Oblast
- Raion: Sambir Raion
- Hromada: Borynia settlement hromada
- Area: 11 km^{2} (4.2 sq mi)
- Elevation: 744 m (2,441 ft)
- Population: 0,833
  - Density: 75,727/km^{2} (196,130/sq mi)
- Website: село Сигловате _{(Ukrainian)}

Syhlovate (Ukrainian: Сигловате; Polish: Syhłowate) is a village (selo) in Sambir Raion, Lviv Oblast in Western Ukraine, deep in the Carpathians. The village is located high in the mountains, the average altitude is 744 metres (2,440 ft) above sea level. It belongs to Borynia settlement hromada, one of the hromadas of Ukraine.

The village is distant from the city of Lviv at 183 kilometres (114 mi), 31 kilometres (19 mi) from Turka, and 150 kilometres (93 mi) from Uzhhorod.

The local government was the Bitlia Village Council before the 2020 administrative reform. Residents of the village are engaged in agriculture and forestry.

In the village there is a church the Transfiguration of our Lord Jesus Christ. Also, the village has a school, forestry, bakery, workshop for furniture.

== History ==
The first mention of Syhlovate in historical documents refers to 1580.

Until 18 July 2020, Syhlovate belonged to Turka Raion. The raion was abolished in July 2020 as part of the administrative reform of Ukraine, which reduced the number of raions of Lviv Oblast to seven. The area of Turka Raion was merged into Sambir Raion.
