= Bukovynka, Lviv Oblast =

Bukovynka Буковинка
- Village
- Location within Lviv Oblast
- Coordinates: 48°59′57″N 23°06′12″E
- Country: Ukraine
- Oblast: Lviv
- Raion: Sambir
- Area: 1.5 km^{2} (0.58 sq mi)
- Population: 208
  - Density: 140/km^{2} (360/sq mi)

Bukovynka (Ukrainian: Буковинка, Polish: Bukowinka) is a village (selo) in Sambir Raion, Lviv Oblast, in south-west Ukraine. It belongs to Borynia settlement hromada, one of the hromadas of Ukraine.

The village used to be a hamlet of Komarnyky.

Until 18 July 2020, Bukovynka belonged to Turka Raion. The raion was abolished in July 2020 as part of the administrative reform of Ukraine, which reduced the number of raions of Lviv Oblast to seven. The area of Turka Raion was merged into Sambir Raion.
