= Bitlia =

Village in Lviv Oblast, Ukraine

Bitlia Бі́тля
- Village
- Location within Lviv Oblast
- Coordinates: 48°58′41″N 22°59′35″E
- Country: Ukraine
- Oblast: Lviv Oblast
- District: Sambir Raion
- Established: 1512

Area
  - Total: 24 km^{2} (9.3 sq mi)
- Elevation /(average value of): 648 m (2,126 ft)

Population
  - Total: 674
  - Density: 45,875/km^{2} (118,820/sq mi)
- Time zone: UTC+2 (EET)
  - Summer (DST): UTC+3 (EEST)
- Postal code: 82551
- Area code: +380 3269
- Website: село Бітля _{(Ukrainian)}

Bitlia (Ukrainian: Бі́тля, Polish: Butla) is a village (selo) in Sambir Raion, Lviv Oblast, in southwest Ukraine. The village is located at a distance of 28 kilometres (17 mi) from the district center of Turka and 160 kilometres (99 mi) from the regional center of Lviv. It belongs to Borynia settlement hromada, one of the hromadas of Ukraine. Its population is 1,101. Local government — Bitlianska village council.

The village Bitlia is located in the Ukrainian Carpathians within the limits of the Eastern Beskids in southwestern Lviv Oblast in Turka Raion.

The first written mention of the settlement dates back to 1512.

Until 18 July 2020, Bitlia belonged to Turka Raion. The raion was abolished in July 2020 as part of the administrative reform of Ukraine, which reduced the number of raions of Lviv Oblast to seven. The area of Turka Raion was merged into Sambir Raion.

== Literature ==
- Ukrainian: Історія міст і сіл УРСР : Львівська область. – К. : ГРУРЕ, 1968 р.) Page 877.
