= Karpatske =

Karpatske Карпа́тське
- Village
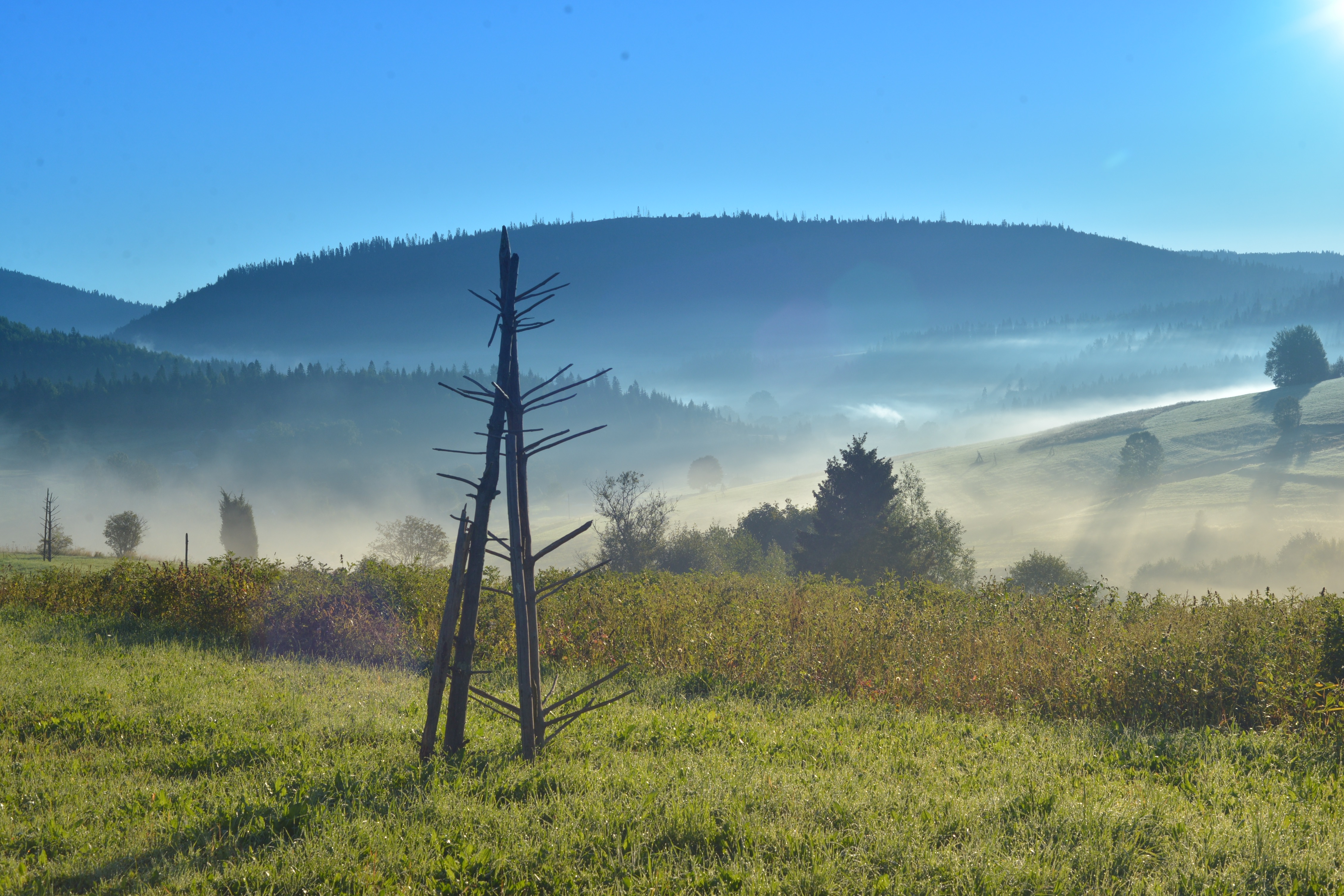

- Location within Lviv Oblast
- Coordinates: 48°57′17″N 22°54′13″E
- Country: Ukraine
- Oblast: Lviv Oblast
- Raion: Sambir Raion
- Established: 1561
- Area: 23 km^{2} (8.9 sq mi)
- Elevation: 729 m (2,392 ft)
- Population: 1,190
  - Density: 51,739/km^{2} (134,000/sq mi)
- Website: село Карпатське _{(Ukrainian)}

Karpatske (Ukrainian: Карпа́тське; formerly known as Hnyla, Гни́ла, Polish: Hnyła) is a village (selo) in Sambir Raion, Lviv Oblast on the western of Ukraine. It belongs to Borynia settlement hromada, one of the hromadas of Ukraine. Its population is 1,190. Local government — Karpatska village council. It is 188 kilometres (117 mi) from the city of Lviv, 155 kilometres (96 mi) from Uzhhorod, and 36 kilometres (22 mi) from Turka.

Its center lies at a latitude of 48.9487800 and longitude of 22.9211600 and it has an elevation of 779 meters above sea level.

The village was established in 1561 by Aleksy Mrzygłód.

Until 18 July 2020, Karpatske belonged to Turka Raion. The raion was abolished in July 2020 as part of the administrative reform of Ukraine, which reduced the number of raions of Lviv Oblast to seven. The area of Turka Raion was merged into Sambir Raion.
