= Benova =

Benova Беньова
- Village
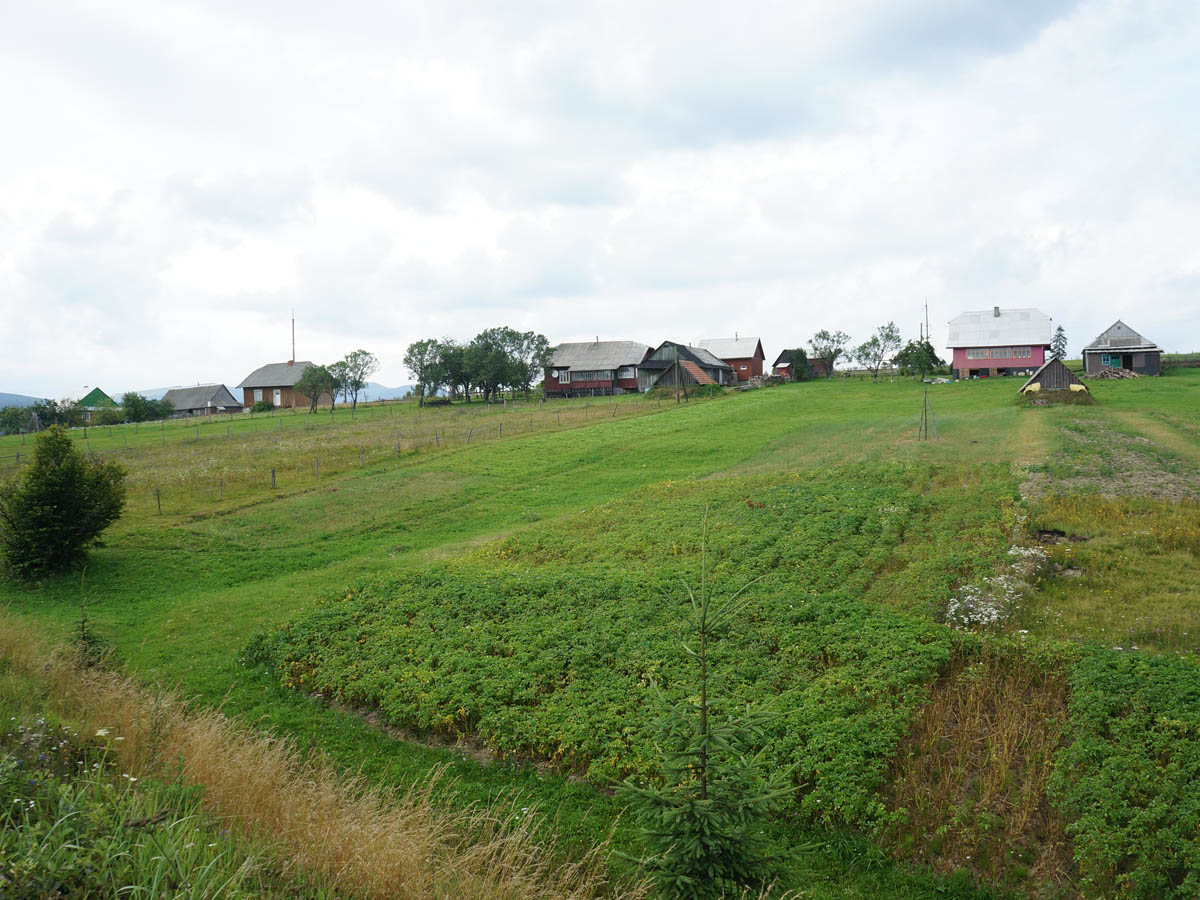
- A view of the village
- Interactive map of Benova
- Location within Lviv Oblast Location within Ukraine
- Coordinates: 49°02′47″N 22°53′27″E
- Country: Ukraine
- Oblast: Lviv Oblast
- Raion: Sambir Raion
- Area: 0.4 km^{2} (0.15 sq mi)
- Elevation: 814 m (2,671 ft)
- Population: 59
  - Density: 150/km^{2} (380/sq mi)

Benova (Ukrainian: Беньова, Polish: Beniowa) is a village (selo) in Sambir Raion, Lviv Oblast, in south-west Ukraine. It belongs to Borynia settlement hromada, one of the hromadas of Ukraine.

In the village there is a train stop and a campsite.

Benova lies on the border with Poland, where an abandoned part of the village is located, called Beniowa.

Until 18 July 2020, Benova belonged to Turka Raion. The raion was abolished in July 2020 as part of the administrative reform of Ukraine, which reduced the number of raions of Lviv Oblast to seven. The area of Turka Raion was merged into Sambir Raion.
