= Ropavske =

Ropavske Ропавське
- Village
- Location within Lviv Oblast
- Coordinates: 49°04′48″N 23°04′03″E
- Country: Ukraine
- Oblast: Lviv
- Raion: Sambir
- Area: 0.5 km^{2} (0.19 sq mi)
- Population: 234
  - Density: 470/km^{2} (1,200/sq mi)

Ropavske (Ukrainian: Ропавське, Polish: Ropawsko) is a village (selo) in Sambir Raion, Lviv Oblast, in south-west Ukraine. It belongs to Borynia settlement hromada, one of the hromadas of Ukraine.

The village gained independence from Nyzhnye Vysotske in the late 19th century.

Until 18 July 2020, Ropavske belonged to Turka Raion. The raion was abolished in July 2020 as part of the administrative reform of Ukraine, which reduced the number of raions of Lviv Oblast to seven. The area of Turka Raion was merged into Sambir Raion.
