= 103rd Territorial Defense Brigade =

Ukrainian Territorial Defense Forces unit

- Ukrainian: 103-тя окрема бригада територіальної оборони
- Active: 27 June 2018 - present
- Country: Ukraine
- Branch: Armed Forces of Ukraine
- Type: Military reserve force
- Role: Light infantry
- Part of: Territorial Defense Forces
- Garrison/HQ: Lviv Oblast; MUN А7031
- Patron: Andrey Sheptytsky
- Engagements: Russo-Ukrainian War; 2024 Kursk offensive
- Website: Official website

Commanders
- Commander: Col. Ihor Bondarenko

Insignia
- Flag

The 103rd Territorial Defense Brigade named after Metropolitan Andrey Sheptytsky (Note: Ukrainian: 103-тя окрема бригада територіальної оборони імені митрополита Андрея Шептицького, romanized: 103-tia okrema bryhada terytorialnoi oborony imeni mytropolyta Andreia Sheptytskoho) is a military formation of the Territorial Defense Forces of Ukraine. It is part of Operational Command West. The brigade participated in the September 2022 Ukrainian offensive and the 2024 Ukrainian invasion of Kursk.

== History ==
On 27 June 2018 the brigade was formed in Lviv Oblast.

On 16 October 2018, as part of a working trip to Lviv Oblast, the then President, Petro Poroshenko, took part in several events dedicated to the Day of Territorial Defense Soldiers, which took place at the International Center for Peacekeeping and Security. Poroshenko inspected the bases used for training territorial defence battalions, in particular the personnel of the 64th Territorial Defense Battalion of the 103rd Independent Territorial Defense Brigade of the Lviv Oblast.

From 17 to 20 July 2019, about two hundred reserve officers of the brigade underwent combat training at the International Center for Peacekeeping and Security.

=== Operations in Donetsk Oblast ===
Units of the 103rd Brigade began performing combat operations in the Donetsk Oblast in March 2022.

Between 6 and 10 May 2022, the brigade's 63rd and 64th Battalions repelled Russian attempts to cross the Siverskyi Donets river near the village of Serebrianka in the Donetsk Oblast.

On 3 September 2022, the brigade's 63rd Battalion participated in the capture of the village of Ozerne in Donetsk Oblast. The brigade has also been credited with capturing the village of Dibrova in the Donetsk Oblast during September 2022.

On 30 September, Ukrainian president Zelensky commended the 103rd Brigade, announcing that it was responsible for the liberation of Yampil in Donetsk Oblast, along with the 214th Battalion of the Special Operations Forces. In early October, the brigade took up defensive positions near Kupiansk.

On 2 October, the brigade received its battle flag.

As of March 2023, units of the brigade were still operating in the Serebriansky forest near the village of Yampil, namely the brigade's 63rd, 65th, and 66th Battalions.

In May 2023, the brigade's 53rd Battalion was involved in combat near Bakhmut, namely near the villages of Berkhivka and Bohdanivka.

As of May 2024, the brigade's 62nd Battalion had been deployed to the Zaporizhzhia Oblast.

=== 2024 Ukrainian invasion of Kursk ===
In 2024, units of the brigade were relocated to the Sumy Oblast in order to defend the Ukrainian border, and later began participating in the Ukrainian operations in Russia's Kursk Oblast from the beginning of August.

On 23 August 2024, the brigade was awarded the honorary title "named after Metropolitan Andrey Sheptytsky" by decree of President Volodymyr Zelenskyy.

In September and October 2024, it was reported that the 103rd Brigade was participating in Ukrainian operations in Russia's Kursk Oblast. Units of the brigade took part in a mid-September battle in the village of Obukhovka. By mid-October, it was reported that the brigade was operating near the village of Zelyonyy Shlyakh, on the left flank of the group of Ukrainian forces in Kursk.

On December 11, 2024, a fighter of the brigade's anti-aircraft battery, who served for more than two years in the combat zone, but then left the unit without permission, accused the head of the brigade's air defense, Colonel Valentyn Kozakevych, of sabotaging the preparation of equipment, misappropriating the property of military personnel, and undermining the combat capability of the air defense unit. He also accused him of incompetence, citing examples of Kozakevych's demands: during the period of redeployment from one frontline region to another, he demanded to move in columns in places where there was an immediate threat of damage by rocket and artillery fire, demanded the accumulation of personnel in areas where the Russians hit with KABs, Shaheds and missiles.

== Structure ==
=== Battalions ===
Badge	Name	Headquarters
	1st Territorial Defense Battalion	Lviv
	2nd Territorial Defense Battalion	Sheptytskyi
	3rd Territorial Defense Battalion	Trostianets (Zolochiv Raion)
	4th Territorial Defense Battalion	Stryi
	5th Territorial Defense Battalion	Mostyska (Yavoriv Raion)
	6th Territorial Defense Battalion	Drohobych
	7nd Territorial Defense Battalion	Strilkovychi (Sambir Raion)

=== Companies ===
- Attack Drone Company "Common Swift"
- Reconnaissance Company
- Counter-Sabotage Company
- Engineering Company
- Communication Company
- Logistics Company
- Mortar Battery

== Commanders ==
- Lieutenant Colonel Mykola Andrushchak (2018)
- Colonel Valerii Kurko (2022)

== See also ==
- Territorial Defense Forces of the Armed Forces of Ukraine
