= Verkhnie =

Verkhnie Верхнє
- Village
- Location within Lviv Oblast
- Coordinates: 49°02′45″N 22°57′10″E
- Country: Ukraine
- Oblast: Lviv Oblast
- Raion: Sambir Raion
- Hromada: Borynia settlement hromada
- Area: 1.3 km^{2} (0.50 sq mi)
- Population: 877
  - Density: 670/km^{2} (1,700/sq mi)

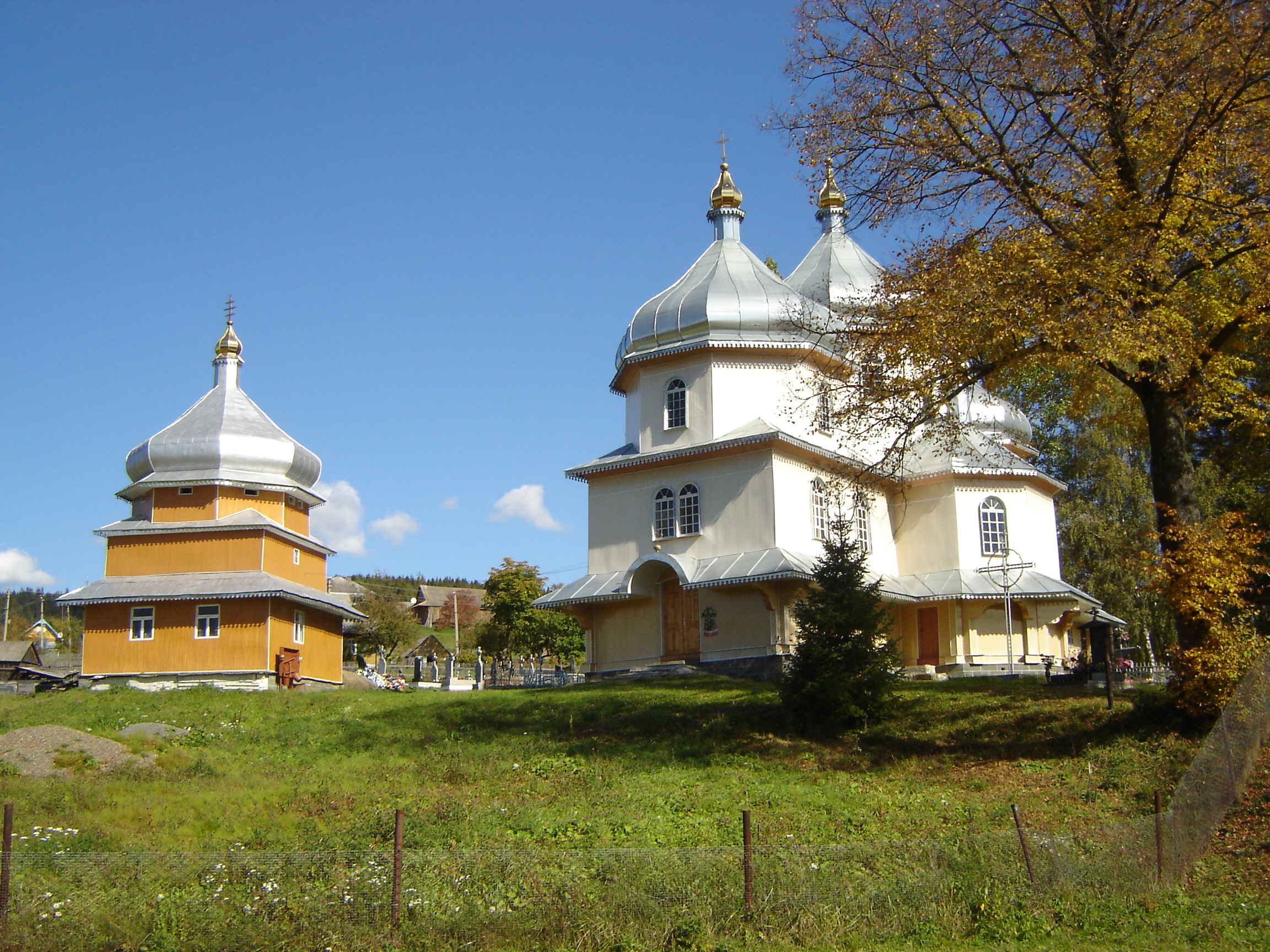
Church of the Presentation of the Blessed Virgin Mary in the village of Verkhne, Turkiv district, burned down in 2015

Verkhnie (Ukrainian: Верхнє, before 1946 Ботелка Вижня; Polish: Butelka Wyżna) is a village (selo) in Sambir Raion, Lviv Oblast, in south-west Ukraine. It belongs to Borynia settlement hromada, one of the hromadas of Ukraine.

The village is a sister settlement of Nyzhnye. Both used to be a single village, which was first mentioned in 1558. There is an Orthodox church built in years 1913–1914.

Until 18 July 2020, Verkhnie belonged to Turka Raion. The raion was abolished in July 2020 as part of the administrative reform of Ukraine, which reduced the number of raions of Lviv Oblast to seven. The area of Turka Raion was merged into Sambir Raion.
