= Sianky =

Village in Lviv Oblast, Ukraine

Sianky Сянки
- Village
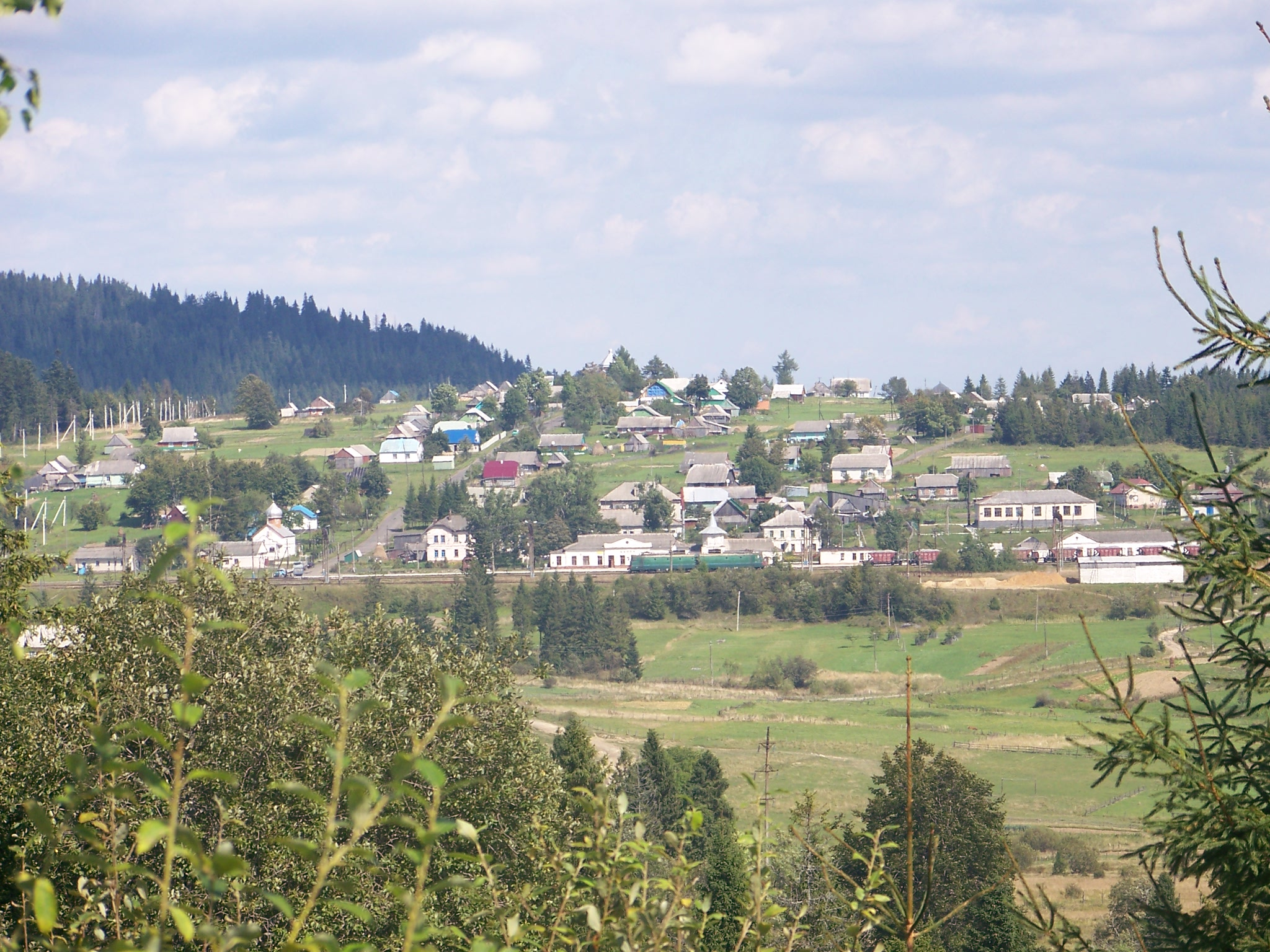
- Landscape of Sianky

- Coat of arms
- Interactive map of Sianky
- Location of Sianky in Lviv Oblast Location of Sianky in Ukraine
- Coordinates: 49°01′30″N 22°54′00″E
- Country: Ukraine
- Oblast: Lviv Oblast
- Raion: Sambir
- Area: 0.7 km^{2} (0.27 sq mi)
- Population: 580
  - Density: 830/km^{2} (2,100/sq mi)

Sianky (Ukrainian: Сянки; Polish: Sianki) is a village in Sambir Raion, Lviv Oblast, Ukraine on the San River. It is located a few kilometers from the border with Poland, in the south-eastern part of Bieszczady. Sianky belongs to Borynia settlement hromada, one of the hromadas of Ukraine.

During 966–1018, 1340–1772 and 1918–1939 Sianky was the part of Poland, while during 1772–1918 it belonged to the Austrian empire (later Austrian-Hungarian empire when double monarchy was introduced in Austria). On September 17, 1939, Sianky was incorporated into the Soviet Union, and since the collapse of the Soviet Union in 1991, it is part of independent Ukraine.

Until 18 July 2020, Sianky belonged to Turka Raion. The raion was abolished in July 2020 as part of the administrative reform of Ukraine, which reduced the number of raions of Lviv Oblast to seven. The area of Turka Raion was merged into Sambir Raion.

A railway station of Lviv-Uzhhorod railroad is located in Sianky. The village's population was about 500 in 2001.
