= Administrative divisions of Lviv Oblast =

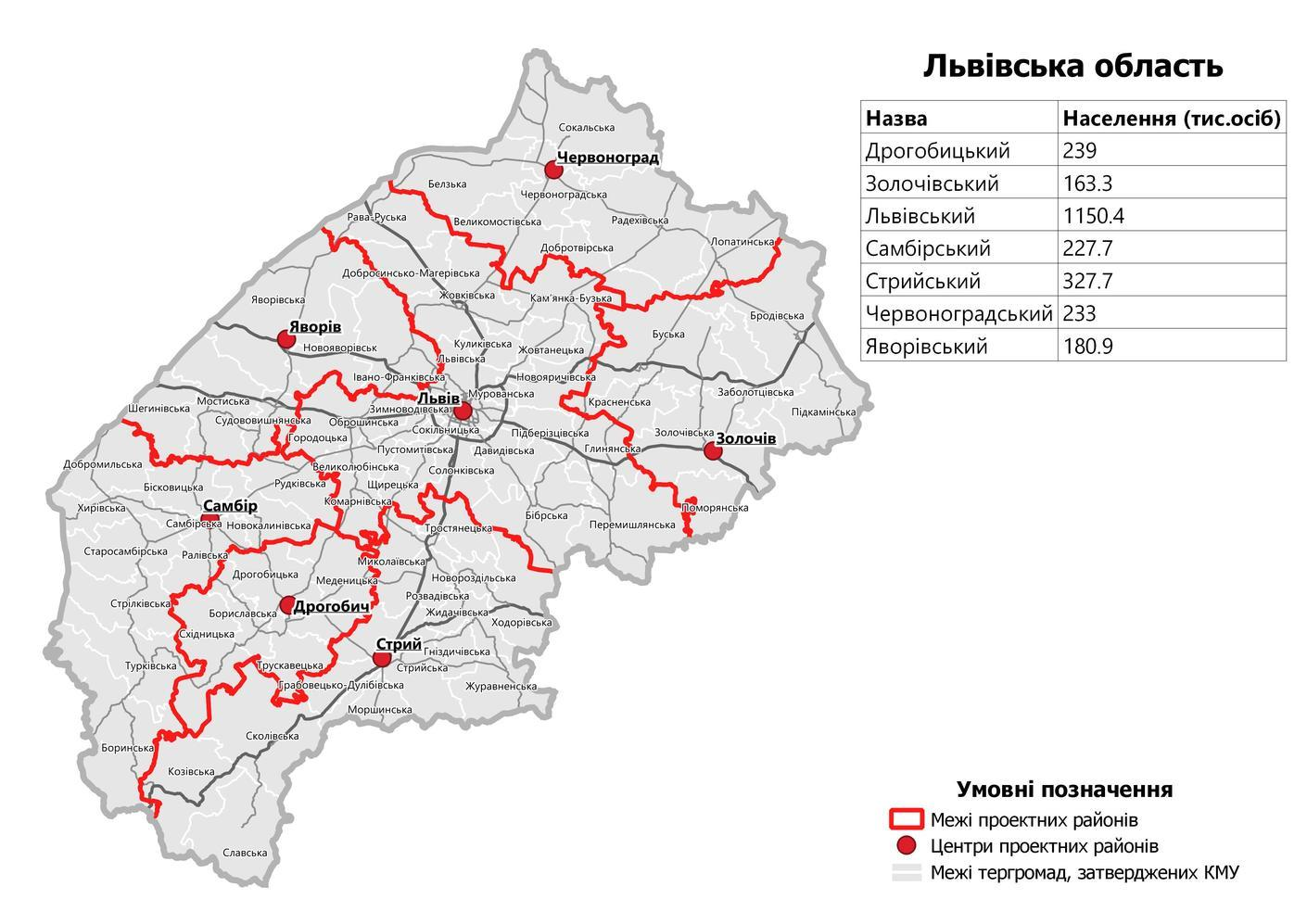
Raions of Lviv Oblast as of August 2020.

Lviv Oblast is subdivided into districts (raions) which are subdivided into municipalities (hromadas).

== Current ==
=== Raions ===
On 18 July 2020, the number of districts was reduced to seven. These are:

Flag	Coat of arms	Name	Ukrainian name	Administrative center	Area (km^{2})	Population estimate 2021	Population density (people/km^{2})	Location map
Flag of Drohobych raion	Drohobych Raion Herb	Drohobych Raion	Дрогобицький район	Drohobych	1493,4	237 409	158,97	Drohobych Raion 2020
Прапор Львівського району	Великий Герб Львівського району	Lviv Raion	Львівський район	Lviv	4976,2	1 141 119	231,1	Lviv Raion 2020
Flag of Sambir region (district)	Coat of Arms of Sambirsky raion in Lviv oblast	Sambir Raion	Самбірський район	Sambir	3247,1	225 925	69,6	Sambir Raion 2020
Flag of Chervonograd region	Chervonogradskiy rayon gerb	Sheptytskyi Raion	Шептицький район	Sheptytskyi	2996,8	230 991	77,08	Chervonohrad Raion 2020
Flag of Stryi raion	Stryiskyi rayon gerb	Stryi Raion	Стрийський район	Stryi	3854	325 491	84,46	Stryi Raion 2020
Flag of Yavoriv raion	Yavorivskyi raion gerb	Yavoriv Raion	Яворівський район	Yavoriv	2373,2	180 252	75,95	Yavoriv Raion 2020
Flag of Zolochiv raion (Lviv oblast)	Герб Золочівського району	Zolochiv Raion	Золочівський район	Zolochiv	2887,9	162 040	56,11	Zolochiv Raion 2020

=== Hromadas ===
Hromada (Громада)	Type	Center	Raion	Raion before 2020
Belz	urban	Belz	Sheptytskyi	Sokal
Bibrka	urban	Bibrka	Lviv	Peremyshliany
Biskovychi	rural	Biskovychi	Sambir	Sambir
Borynia	settlement	Borynia	Sambir	Turka
Boryslav	urban	Boryslav	Drohobych	Boryslav Municipality
Brody	urban	Brody	Zolochiv	Brody
Busk	urban	Busk	Zolochiv	Busk
Sheptytskyi	urban	Sheptytskyi	Sheptytskyi	Chervonohrad Municipality
Davydiv	rural	Davydiv	Lviv	Pustomyty
Dobromyl	urban	Dobromyl	Sambir	Staryi Sambir
Dobrosyn-Maheriv	rural	Maheriv	Lviv	Zhovkva
Dobrotvir	settlement	Dobrotvir	Sheptytskyi	Kamianka-Buzka
Drohobych	urban	Drohobych	Drohobych	Drohobych Municipality
Hlyniany	urban	Hlyniany	Lviv	Zolochiv
Hnizdychiv	settlement	Hnizdychiv	Stryi	Zhydachiv
Horodok	urban	Horodok	Lviv	Horodok
Hrabovets-Duliby	rural	Duliby	Stryi	Stryi
Ivano-Frankove	settlement	Ivano-Frankove	Yavoriv	Yavoriv
Kamianka-Buzka	urban	Kamianka-Buzka	Lviv	Kamianka-Buzka
Khodoriv	urban	Khodoriv	Stryi	Zhydachiv
Khyriv	urban	Khyriv	Sambir	Staryi Sambir
Komarno	urban	Komarno	Lviv	Horodok
Koziova	rural	Koziova	Stryi	Skole
Krasne	settlement	Krasne	Zolochiv	Busk
Kulykiv	settlement	Kulykiv	Lviv	Zhovkva
Lopatyn	settlement	Lopatyn	Sheptytskyi	Radekhiv
Lviv	urban	Lviv	Lviv	Lviv Municipality
Medenychi	settlement	Medenychi	Drohobych	Drohobych
Morshyn	urban	Morshyn	Stryi	city of Morshyn
Mostyska	urban	Mostyska	Yavoriv	Mostyska
Murovane	rural	Murovane	Lviv	Pustomyty
Mykolaiv	urban	Mykolaiv	Stryi	Mykolaiv
Novoiavorivsk	urban	Novoiavorivsk	Yavoriv	Yavoriv
Novyi Kalyniv	urban	Novyi Kalyniv	Sambir	Sambir
Novyi Rozdil	urban	Novyi Rozdil	Stryi	city of Novyi Rozdil
Obroshyne	rural	Obroshyne	Lviv	Pustomyty
Peremyshliany	urban	Peremyshliany	Lviv	Peremyshliany
Pidberiztsi	rural	Pidberiztsi	Lviv	Pustomyty
Pidkamin	settlement	Pidkamin	Zolochiv	Brody
Pomoriany	settlement	Pomoriany	Zolochiv	Zolochiv
Pustomyty	urban	Pustomyty	Lviv	Pustomyty
Radekhiv	urban	Radekhiv	Sheptytskyi	Radekhiv
Ralivka	rural	Ralivka	Sambir	Sambir
Rava-Ruska	urban	Rava-Ruska	Lviv	Zhovkva
Rozvadiv	rural	Rozvadiv	Stryi	Mykolaiv
Rudky	urban	Rudky	Sambir	Sambir
Sambir	urban	Sambir	Sambir	city of Sambir
Shchyrets	settlement	Shchyrets	Lviv	Pustomyty
Shehyni	rural	Shehyni	Yavoriv	Mostyska
Skhidnytsia	settlement	Skhidnytsia	Drohobych	Boryslav Municipality
Skole	urban	Skole	Stryi	Skole
Slavske	settlement	Slavske	Stryi	Skole
Sokal	urban	Sokal	Sheptytskyi	Sokal
Sokilnyky	rural	Sokilnyky	Lviv	Pustomyty
Solonka	rural	Solonka	Lviv	Pustomyty
Staryi Sambir	urban	Staryi Sambir	Sambir	Staryi Sambir
Strilky	rural	Strilky	Sambir	Staryi Sambir
Stryi	urban	Stryi	Stryi	city of Stryi
Sudova Vyshnia	urban	Sudova Vyshnia	Yavoriv	Mostyska
Trostianets	rural	Trostianets	Stryi	Mykolaiv
Truskavets	urban	Truskavets	Drohobych	city of Truskavets
Turka	urban	Turka	Sambir	Turka
Velyki Mosty	urban	Velyki Mosty	Sheptytskyi	Sokal
Velykyi Liubin	settlement	Velykyi Liubin	Lviv	Horodok
Yarychiv	settlement	Novyi Yarychiv	Lviv	Kamianka-Buzka
Yavoriv	urban	Yavoriv	Yavoriv	Yavoriv
Zabolottsi	rural	Zabolottsi	Zolochiv	Brody
Zhovkva	urban	Zhovkva	Lviv	Zhovkva
Zhovtantsi	rural	Zhovtantsi	Lviv	Kamianka-Buzka
Zhuravne	settlement	Zhuravne	Stryi	Zhydachiv
Zhydachiv	urban	Zhydachiv	Stryi	Zhydachiv
Zolochiv	urban	Zolochiv	Zolochiv	Zolochiv
Zymna Voda	rural	Zymna Voda	Lviv	Pustomyty

== Administrative divisions until 2020 ==
Raions of Lviv Oblast as of June 2020. The city of Lviv is shown in dark blue.

Before July 2020, Lviv Oblast was subdivided into 29 regions: 20 districts (raions) and 9 city municipalities (mis'krada or misto), officially known as territories governed by city councils.

- Cities under the oblast's jurisdiction:
  - Lviv Municipality
    - Cities and towns under the city's jurisdiction:
      - Lviv (Львів), the administrative center of the oblast
      - Vynnyky (Винники)
    - Urban-type settlements under the city's jurisdiction:
      - Briukhovychi (Брюховичі)
      - Rudne (Рудне)
  - Boryslav Municipality
    - Cities and towns under the city's jurisdiction:
      - Boryslav (Борислав)
    - Urban-type settlements under the city's jurisdiction:
      - Skhidnytsia (Східниця)
  - Chervonohrad Municipality
    - Cities and towns under the city's jurisdiction:
      - Chervonohrad (Червоноград)
    - Urban-type settlements under the city's jurisdiction:
      - Hirnyk (Гірник)
  - Drohobych Municipality
    - Cities and towns under the city's jurisdiction:
      - Drohobych (Дрогобич)
      - Stebnyk (Стебник)
  - Morshyn (Моршин)
  - Novyi Rozdil (Новий Розділ)
  - Sambir (Самбір)
  - Stryi (Стрий)
  - Truskavets (Трускавець)
- Districts (raions):
  - Brody (Бродівський район)
    - Cities and towns under the district's jurisdiction:
      - Brody (Броди)
    - Urban-type settlements under the district's jurisdiction:
      - Pidkamin (Підкамінь)
  - Busk (Буський район)
    - Cities and towns under the district's jurisdiction:
      - Busk (Буськ)
    - Urban-type settlements under the district's jurisdiction:
      - Krasne (Красне)
      - Olesko (Олесько)
  - Drohobych (Дрогобицький район)
    - Urban-type settlements under the district's jurisdiction:
      - Medenychi (Меденичі)
      - Pidbuzh (Підбуж)
  - Horodok (Городоцький район)
    - Cities and towns under the district's jurisdiction:
      - Horodok (Городок)
      - Komarno (Комарно)
    - Urban-type settlements under the district's jurisdiction:
      - Velykyi Liubin (Великий Любінь)
  - Kamianka-Buzka (Кам'янка-Бузький район)
    - Cities and towns under the district's jurisdiction:
      - Kamianka-Buzka (Кам'янка-Бузька)
    - Urban-type settlements under the district's jurisdiction:
      - Dobrotvir (Добротвір)
      - Novyi Yarychiv (Новий Яричів)
      - Zapytiv (Запитів)
  - Mostyska (Мостиський район)
    - Cities and towns under the district's jurisdiction:
      - Mostyska (Мостиська)
      - Sudova Vyshnia (Судова Вишня)
  - Mykolaiv (Миколаївський район)
    - Cities and towns under the district's jurisdiction:
      - Mykolaiv (Миколаїв)
    - Urban-type settlements under the district's jurisdiction:
      - Rozdil (Розділ)
  - Peremyshliany (Перемишлянський район)
    - Cities and towns under the district's jurisdiction:
      - Bibrka (Бібрка)
      - Peremyshliany (Перемишляни)
  - Pustomyty (Пустомитівський район)
    - Cities and towns under the district's jurisdiction:
      - Pustomyty (Пустомити)
    - Urban-type settlements under the district's jurisdiction:
      - Shchyrets (Щирець)
  - Radekhiv (Радехівський район)
    - Cities and towns under the district's jurisdiction:
      - Radekhiv (Радехів)
    - Urban-type settlements under the district's jurisdiction:
      - Lopatyn (Лопатин)
  - Sambir (Самбірський район)
    - Cities and towns under the district's jurisdiction:
      - Novyi Kalyniv (Новий Калинів)
      - Rudky (Рудки)
    - Urban-type settlements under the district's jurisdiction:
      - Dubliany (Дубляни)
  - Skole (Сколівський район)
    - Cities and towns under the district's jurisdiction:
      - Skole (Сколе)
    - Urban-type settlements under the district's jurisdiction:
      - Slavske (Славське)
      - Verkhnie Synovydne (Верхнє Синьовидне)
  - Sokal (Сокальський район)
    - Cities and towns under the district's jurisdiction:
      - Belz (Белз)
      - Sokal (Сокаль)
      - Sosnivka (Соснівка)
      - Uhniv (Угнів)
      - Velyki Mosty (Великі Мости)
    - Urban-type settlements under the district's jurisdiction:
      - Zhvyrka (Жвирка)
  - Staryi Sambir (Старосамбірський район)
    - Cities and towns under the district's jurisdiction:
      - Dobromyl (Добромиль)
      - Khyriv (Хирів)
      - Staryi Sambir (Старий Самбір)
    - Urban-type settlements under the district's jurisdiction:
      - Nyzhankovychi (Нижанковичі)
      - Stara Sil (Стара Сіль)
  - Stryi (Стрийський район)
    - Urban-type settlements under the district's jurisdiction:
      - Dashava (Дашава)
  - Turka (Турківський район)
    - Cities and towns under the district's jurisdiction:
      - Turka (Турка)
    - Urban-type settlements under the district's jurisdiction:
      - Borynia (Бориня)
  - Yavoriv (Яворівський район)
    - Cities and towns under the district's jurisdiction:
      - Novoiavorivsk (Новояворівськ)
      - Yavoriv (Яворів)
    - Urban-type settlements under the district's jurisdiction:
      - Ivano-Frankove (Івано-Франкове)
      - Krakovets (Краковець)
      - Nemyriv (Немирів)
      - Shklo (Шкло)
  - Zhovkva (Жовківський район)
    - Cities and towns under the district's jurisdiction:
      - Dubliany (Дубляни)
      - Rava-Ruska (Рава-Руська)
      - Zhovkva (Жовква)
    - Urban-type settlements under the district's jurisdiction:
      - Kulykiv (Куликів)
      - Maheriv (Магерів)
  - Zhydachiv (Жидачівський район)
    - Cities and towns under the district's jurisdiction:
      - Khodoriv (Ходорів)
      - Zhydachiv (Жидачів)
    - Urban-type settlements under the district's jurisdiction:
      - Hnizdychiv (Гніздичів)
      - Novi Strilyshcha (Нові Стрілища)
      - Zhuravne (Журавне)
  - Zolochiv (Золочівський район)
    - Cities and towns under the district's jurisdiction:
      - Hlyniany (Глиняни)
      - Zolochiv (Золочів)
    - Urban-type settlements under the district's jurisdiction:
      - Pomoriany (Поморяни)
