= Shandrovets =

Shandrovets Шандровець
- Village
- Location within Lviv Oblast
- Coordinates: 49°10′10″N 22°51′18″E
- Country: Ukraine
- Oblast: Lviv
- Raion: Sambir
- Area: 3.4 km^{2} (1.3 sq mi)
- Population: 1,263
  - Density: 370/km^{2} (960/sq mi)

Shandrovets (Ukrainian: Шандровець, Polish: Szandrowiec, Slovak: Šandrovec) is a village (selo) in Sambir Raion, Lviv Oblast, in south-west Ukraine. It belongs to Borynia settlement hromada, one of the hromadas of Ukraine.

The village was first mentioned in 1580. An Orthodox church was mentioned in 1589. The currently standing wooden Orthodox church was built in 1924, in the Ukrainian national style.

Until 18 July 2020, Shandrovets belonged to Turka Raion. The raion was abolished in July 2020 as part of the administrative reform of Ukraine, which reduced the number of raions of Lviv Oblast to seven. The area of Turka Raion was merged into Sambir Raion.
