= Nyzhnie =

Nyzhnie Нижнє
- Village
- Location within Lviv Oblast
- Coordinates: 49°01′05″N 22°59′55″E
- Country: Ukraine
- Oblast: Lviv Oblast
- Raion: Sambir Raion
- Hromada: Borynia settlement hromada
- Area: 1.2 km^{2} (0.46 sq mi)
- Population: 547
  - Density: 460/km^{2} (1,200/sq mi)

Nyzhnie (Ukrainian: Нижнє; Polish: Butelka Niżna) is a village (selo) in Sambir Raion, Lviv Oblast, in south-west Ukraine. It belongs to the Borynia settlement hromada, one of the hromadas of Ukraine.

The village is a sister settlement of Verkhne. Both used to be a single village, which was first mentioned in 1558. There is an Orthodox church built in 1870.

Until 18 July 2020, Nyzhnie belonged to Turka Raion. The raion was abolished in July 2020 as part of the administrative reform of Ukraine, which reduced the number of raions in Lviv Oblast to seven. The area of Turka Raion was merged into Sambir Raion.
