= Verkhnia Yablunka =

Verkhnia Yablunka Верхня Яблунька
- Village
- Location within Lviv Oblast
- Coordinates: 49°08′15″N 22°55′00″E
- Country: Ukraine
- Oblast: Lviv Oblast
- Raion: Sambir Raion
- Hromada: Borynia settlement hromada
- Area: 3.3 km^{2} (1.3 sq mi)
- Population: 2,145
  - Density: 650/km^{2} (1,700/sq mi)

Verkhnia Yablunka (Ukrainian: Верхня Яблунька; Polish: Jabłonka Wyżna) is a village (selo) in Sambir Raion, Lviv Oblast, in south-west Ukraine. It hosts the administration of Borynia settlement hromada, one of the hromadas of Ukraine.

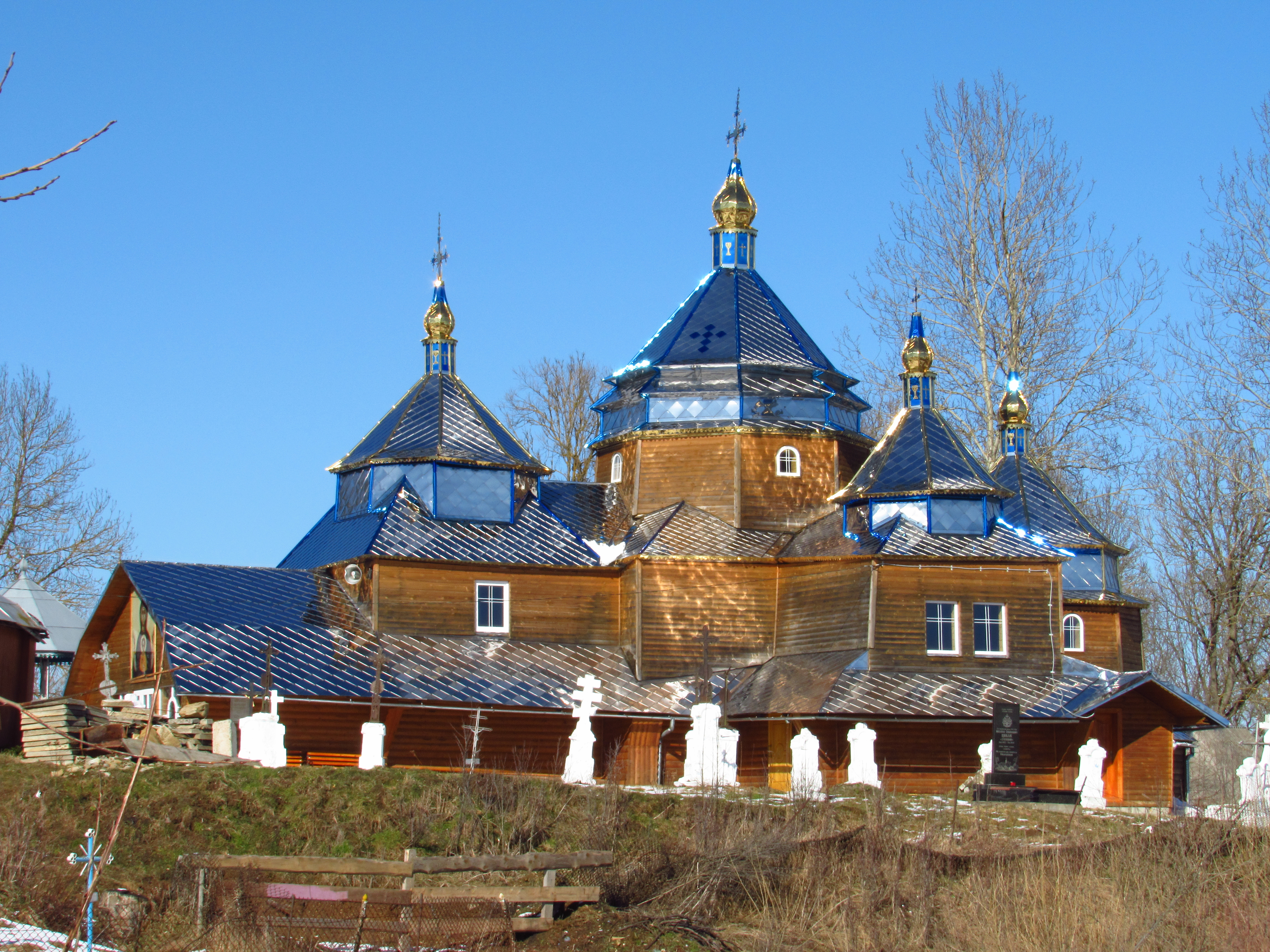
Church in Verkhnia Yablunka

The village was established in 1559. An Orthodox church was mentioned in 1566. The currently standing wooden Orthodox church was built in 1788.

Until 18 July 2020, Verkhnia Yablunka belonged to Turka Raion. The raion was abolished in July 2020 as part of the administrative reform of Ukraine, which reduced the number of raions of Lviv Oblast to seven. The area of Turka Raion was merged into Sambir Raion.
