= Bahnuvate =

Bahnuvate Багнувате
- Village
- Location within Lviv Oblast
- Coordinates: 49°03′21″N 23°09′28″E
- Country: Ukraine
- Oblast: Lviv
- Raion: Sambir
- Area: 1.9 km^{2} (0.73 sq mi)
- Population: 294
  - Density: 150/km^{2} (400/sq mi)

Bahnuvate (Ukrainian: Багнувате, Polish: Bahnowate) is a village (selo) in Sambir Raion, Lviv Oblast, in south-west Ukraine. It belongs to Borynia settlement hromada, one of the hromadas of Ukraine.

The village boasts an Orthodox church, built in 1929 according to the design of Jewhen Nahirny, in the Ukrainian national style.

Until 18 July 2020, Bahnuvate belonged to Turka Raion. The raion was abolished in July 2020 as part of the administrative reform of Ukraine, which reduced the number of raions of Lviv Oblast to seven. The area of Turka Raion was merged into Sambir Raion.
