= Nyzhnii Turiv =

Nyzhnii Turiv Нижній Турів
- Village
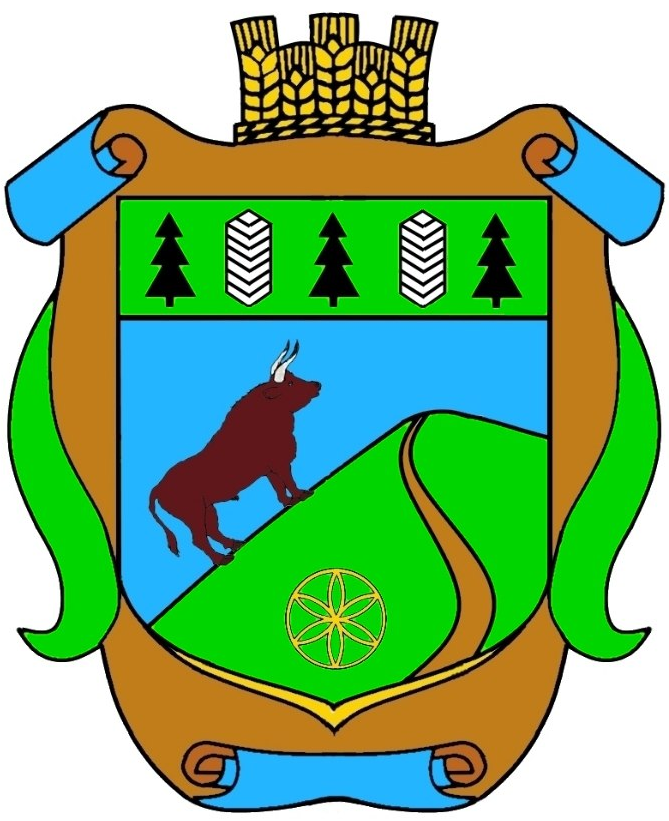
- Coat of arms

- Location within Lviv Oblast
- Coordinates: 49°05′31″N 22°56′24″E
- Country: Ukraine
- Oblast: Lviv
- Raion: Sambir
- Area: 1.8 km^{2} (0.69 sq mi)
- Population: 512
  - Density: 280/km^{2} (740/sq mi)

Nyzhnii Turiv (Ukrainian: Нижній Турів, Polish: Tureczki Niżne) is a village (selo) in Sambir Raion, Lviv Oblast, in south-west Ukraine. It belongs to Borynia settlement hromada, one of the hromadas of Ukraine.

The village was established in 1556. An Orthodox church was probably built soon afterwards. The currently standing wooden Orthodox church was built in 1914, in the Ukrainian national style.

Until 18 July 2020, Nyzhnii Turiv belonged to Turka Raion. The raion was abolished in July 2020 as part of the administrative reform of Ukraine, which reduced the number of raions of Lviv Oblast to seven. The area of Turka Raion was merged into Sambir Raion.
