= Verkhnii Turiv =

Verkhnii Turiv Верхній Турів Tureczki Wyżne
- Village
- Location within Lviv Oblast Location within Ukraine
- Coordinates: 49°03′57″N 22°55′36″E
- Country: Ukraine
- Oblast: Lviv Oblast
- Raion: Sambir Raion
- Hromada: Borynia settlement hromada
- Area: 1.3 km^{2} (0.50 sq mi)
- Population: 485
  - Density: 370/km^{2} (970/sq mi)

Verkhnii Turiv (Ukrainian: Верхній Турів; Polish: Tureczki Wyżne) is a village (selo) in Sambir Raion, Lviv Oblast, in south-west Ukraine. It belongs to Borynia settlement hromada, one of the hromadas of Ukraine.

The village was first mentioned in 1564. There is a wooden Orthodox church built in 1890.

Until 18 July 2020, Verkhnii Turiv belonged to Turka Raion. The raion was abolished in July 2020 as part of the administrative reform of Ukraine, which reduced the number of raions of Lviv Oblast to seven. The area of Turka Raion was merged into Sambir Raion.
