= Nyzhnia Yablunka =

Nyzhnia Yablunka Нижня Яблунька
- Village
- Location within Lviv Oblast
- Coordinates: 49°07′29″N 22°58′31″E
- Country: Ukraine
- Oblast: Lviv Oblast
- Raion: Sambir Raion
- Hromada: Borynia settlement hromada
- Area: 6.3 km^{2} (2.4 sq mi)
- Population: 2,826
  - Density: 450/km^{2} (1,200/sq mi)

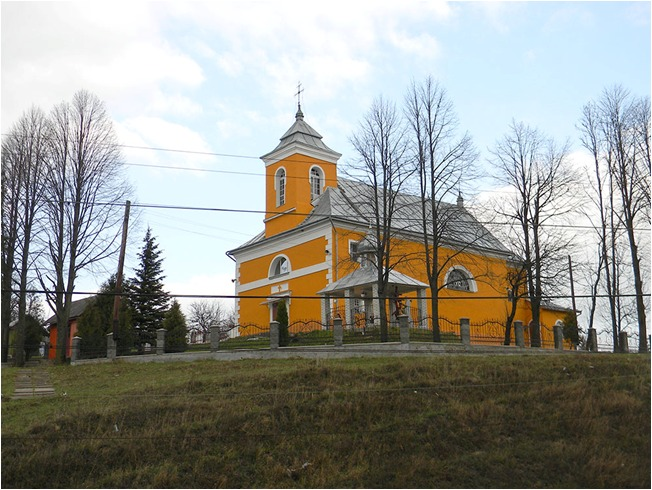
Church built in 1820 in Nyzhnya Yablunka

Nyzhnia Yablunka (Ukrainian: Нижня Яблунька; Polish: Jabłonka Niżna) is a village (selo) in Sambir Raion, Lviv Oblast, in south-west Ukraine. It belongs to Borynia settlement hromada, one of the hromadas of Ukraine.

The village was established in 1522 on a tributary of the Yablunka River. An Orthodox church was mentioned in 1589. The currently standing Orthodox church was built in 1820.

The Lviv-Sambir-Uzhhorod railway passes through the village.

262 villagers took part in the German-Soviet war on the side of the USSR. 59 of them died. In 1970, a memorial obelisk was erected in the village in honor of those killed by the Nazis.

Until 18 July 2020, Nyzhnia Yablunka belonged to Turka Raion. The raion was abolished in July 2020 as part of the administrative reform of Ukraine, which reduced the number of raions of Lviv Oblast to seven. The area of Turka Raion was merged into Sambir Raion.
