= Boberka =

Boberka Боберка
- Village
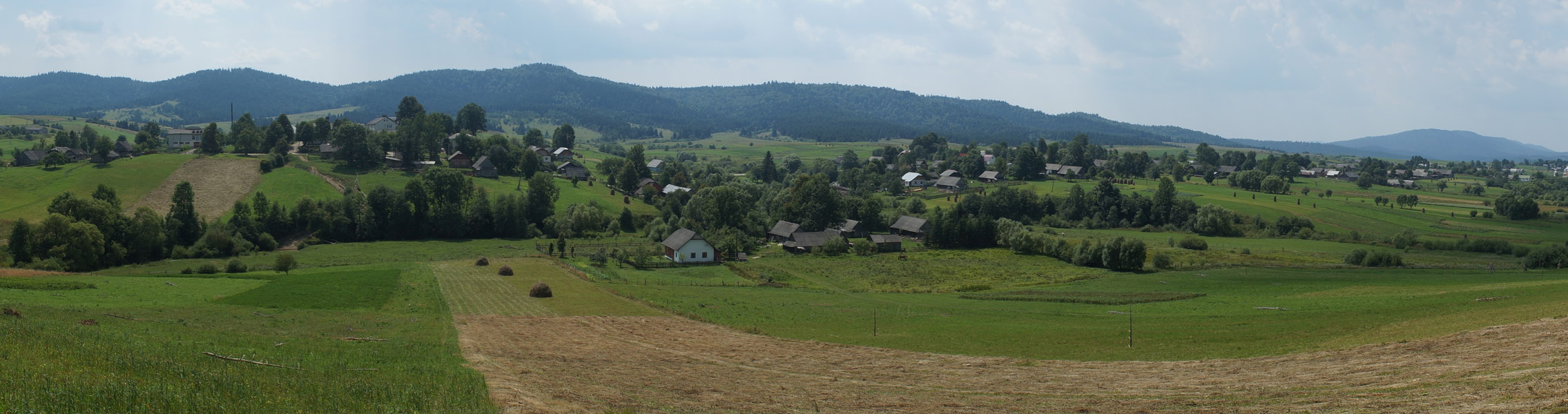
- General view

- Location within Lviv Oblast
- Coordinates: 49°12′03″N 22°48′04″E
- Country: Ukraine
- Oblast: Lviv
- Raion: Sambir
- Established: 1537
- Area: 4.7 km^{2} (1.8 sq mi)
- Population: 1,203
  - Density: 260/km^{2} (660/sq mi)

Boberka (Ukrainian: Боберка) is a village (selo) in Sambir Raion, Lviv Oblast, in south-west Ukraine. It belongs to Borynia settlement hromada, one of the hromadas of Ukraine.

The village was established in 1537. The founder, Ivan Volosh, sponsored then also an Orthodox church. Currently there are two Orthodox churches in Boberka, built in 1913 and 1914 respectively.

Until 18 July 2020, Boberka belonged to Turka Raion. The raion was abolished in July 2020 as part of the administrative reform of Ukraine, which reduced the number of raions of Lviv Oblast to seven. The area of Turka Raion was merged into Sambir Raion.

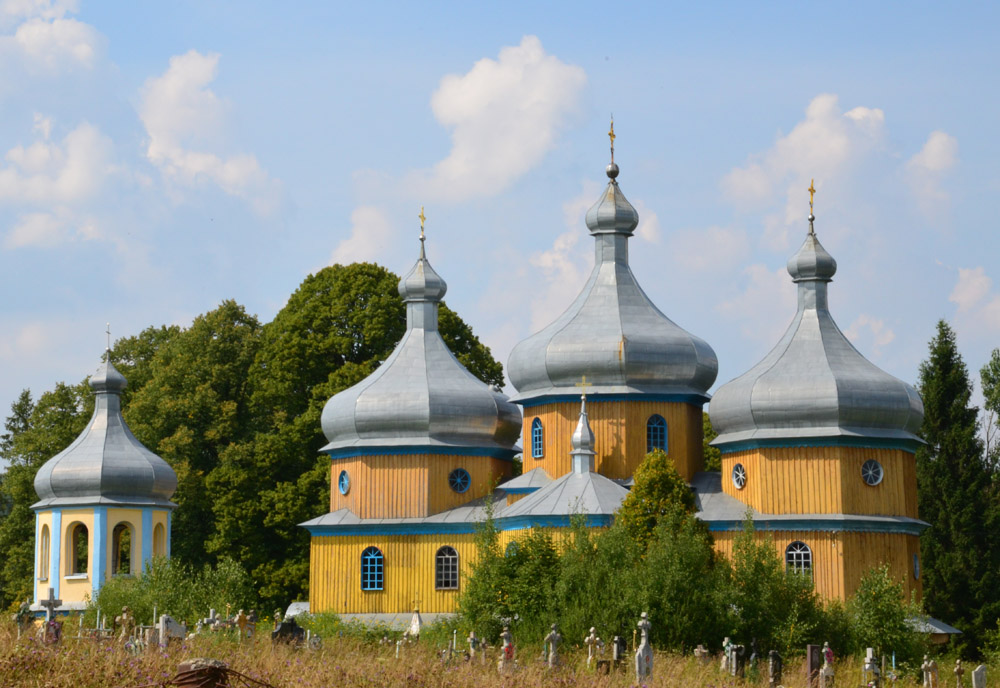
An Orthodox church (1914)
