= Borynia, Ukraine =

Rural locality in Lviv Oblast, Ukraine

Borynia Бориня
- Rural settlement
- Coat of arms

- Location of Borynia Borynia (Lviv Oblast)
- Coordinates: 49°04′40″N 22°59′43″E
- Country: Ukraine
- Oblast: Lviv Oblast
- Raion: Sambir Raion
- Hromada: Borynia settlement hromada

Area
  - Total: 25 km^{2} (9.7 sq mi)

Population (2022)
  - Total: 1,375
- Area code: +380 3269
- Website: borynyatg.gov.ua.

Borynia (Ukrainian: Бориня) is a rural settlement in Sambir Raion, Lviv Oblast, western Ukraine. It is situated near the Stryi River, about 145 kilometres (90 mi) from the city of Lviv, 106 kilometres (66 mi) from Uzhhorod, and 14 kilometres (8.7 mi) from Turka. It hosts the administration of Borynia settlement hromada, one of the hromadas of Ukraine. Its local government is the Borynia Settlement Council. Population: 1,375 (2022 estimate).

The main occupation of the population is agriculture and forestry.

== History ==
The first written mention of the settlement dates back to 1552. In 1870 a treasure of Roman coins from Emperor Trajan times, were discovered in Borynia.

Until 18 July 2020, Borynia belonged to Turka Raion. The raion was abolished in July 2020 as part of the administrative reform of Ukraine, which reduced the number of raions of Lviv Oblast to seven. The area of Turka Raion was merged into Sambir Raion.

Until 26 January 2024, Borynia was designated urban-type settlement. On this day, a new law entered into force which abolished this status, and Borynia became a rural settlement.

== Literature ==
- Ukrainian: Історія міст і сіл УРСР : Львівська область. – К. : ГРУРЕ, 1968 р.
