= Side, Ukraine =

Rural locality in Lviv Oblast, Ukraine

Side Сіде
- Location in Lviv Oblast
- Coordinates: 49°28′35″N 23°17′20″E
- Country: Ukraine
- Oblast: Lviv Oblast
- Raion: Sambir Raion
- Hromada: Ralivka rural hromada
- Time zone: UTC+2 (EET)
  - Summer (DST): UTC+3 (EEST)
- Postal code: 81478

Side (Ukrainian: Сіде) is a village in Ralivka rural hromada, Sambir Raion, Lviv Oblast, Ukraine.

== People ==
- Olha Kuzmenko (1947–2023), Ukrainian writer, educator, and mother of Andriy Kuzmenko.
