= Chukva =

Rural locality in Lviv Oblast, Ukraine

Coordinates: 49°28′N 23°11′E

Chukva (Ukrainian: Чуква, Polish: Czukiew) is a village in Sambir Raion (district), Lviv Oblast (province), Ukraine. It belongs to Ralivka rural hromada, one of the hromadas of Ukraine.

The village is home to the Parish of the Nativity of the Blessed Virgin Mary, where the parish priests included Franciszek Salezy Matwijkiewicz (1881–1894) and Maurycy Turkowski (1899).

In the Second Polish Republic, the village was part of the Sambir County in the Lwów Voivodeship.

Between 1943 and 1944, Ukrainian nationalists from the OUN-UPA brutally murdered 17 Poles here as a part of Volhynia genocide.

Notable individuals born in Czukwa include Stefan Balicki and Jan Serafin.
