= Beniowa =

- Village
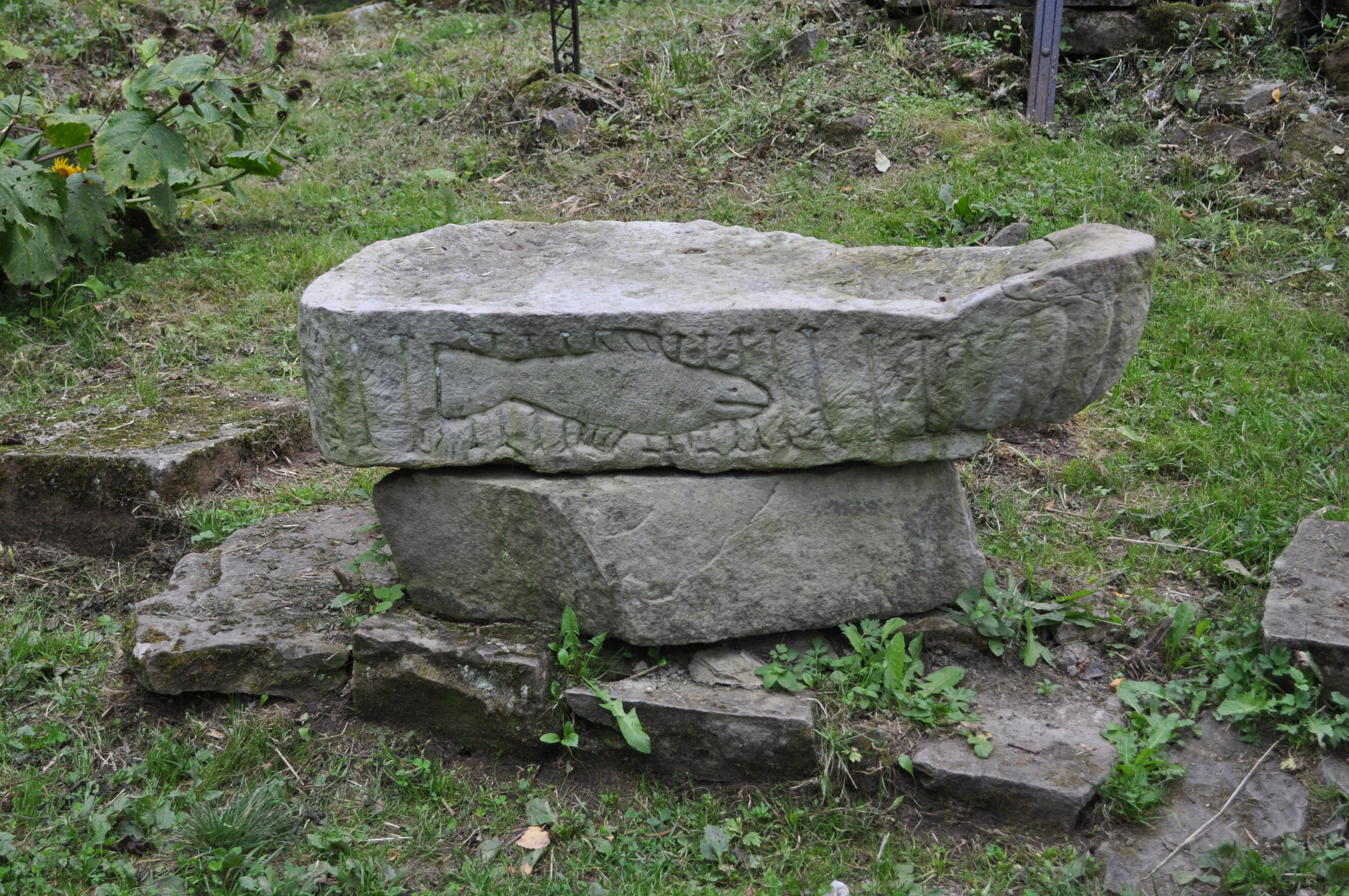
- Cemetery in Beniowa
- Interactive map of Beniowa
- Location within Poland
- Coordinates: 49°3′38″N 22°51′52″E
- Country: Poland
- Voivodeship: Subcarpathian
- County: Bieszczady
- Gmina: Lutowiska
- Population: 0

Beniowa [bɛˈɲɔva] is a former village in the administrative district of Gmina Lutowiska, within Bieszczady County, Subcarpathian Voivodeship, in south-eastern Poland, close to the border with Ukraine.

The part of the village now in Ukraine, is called Beniova.
