= Ralivka rural hromada =

Rural hromada in Lviv Oblast, Ukraine

Ralivka rural hromada Ралівська сільська громада
- Hromada
- Interactive map of Ralivka rural hromada
- Coordinates: 49°30′29″N 23°14′59″E
- Country: Ukraine
- Oblast: Lviv Oblast
- Raion: Sambir Raion
- Admin. center: Ralivka

Area
  - Total: 2,293 km^{2} (885 sq mi)

Population (2020)
  - Total: 13,061
  - Density: 5.696/km^{2} (14.75/sq mi)
- CATOTTG code: UA46080090000029798
- Settlements: 23
- Villages: 23
- Website: ralivska-gromada.gov.ua

Ralivka rural territorial hromada (Ukrainian: Ралівська територіальна громада, romanized: Ralivska silska terytorialna hromada) is a hromada in Ukraine, in Sambir Raion of Lviv Oblast. The administrative center is the village of Ralivka. Its population is 13 061 (2020 est.).

== Settlements ==
The hromada consists of 23 villages:

- Berezhnytsia
- Blazhiv
- Vilshanyk
- Volia-Blazhivska
- Volianka
- Hlyboch
- Horodyshche
- Zadnistria
- Zvir
- Kulchytsi
- Lopushno
- Lukavytsia
- Mala Sprynka
- Mlyn
- Monastyrets
- Nahirne
- Ralivka
- Side
- Sprynia
- Troiany
- Khatky
- Cherkhava
- Chukva
