= Komarnyky =

Komarnyky Комарники
- Village
- Location within Lviv Oblast
- Coordinates: 48°59′20″N 23°02′31″E
- Country: Ukraine
- Oblast: Lviv
- Raion: Sambir
- Area: 2.2 km^{2} (0.85 sq mi)
- Population: 1,031
  - Density: 470/km^{2} (1,200/sq mi)

Komarnyky (Ukrainian: Комарники, Polish: Komarniki) is a village (selo) in Sambir Raion, Lviv Oblast, in south-west Ukraine. It belongs to Borynia settlement hromada, one of the hromadas of Ukraine.

The village was established in the second half of the 15th century. There is a Saint Michael Orthodox church in the village, built in 1921.

Until 18 July 2020, Komarnyky belonged to Turka Raion. The raion was abolished in July 2020 as part of the administrative reform of Ukraine, which reduced the number of raions of Lviv Oblast to seven. The area of Turka Raion was merged into Sambir Raion.
