= Strilkovychi =

Rural locality in Lviv Oblast, Ukraine

Strilkovychi Стрілковичі
- Village
- Location within Lviv Oblast Location within Ukraine
- Coordinates: 49°29′59″N 23°08′02″E
- Country: Ukraine
- Oblast: Lviv
- Raion: Sambir
- Area: 10.397 km^{2} (4.014 sq mi)
- Population: 1,208
  - Density: 116.2/km^{2} (300.9/sq mi)

Strilkovychi (Ukrainian: Стрілковичі, Polish: Strzałkowice) is a village (selo) in Sambir Raion, Lviv Oblast, in south-west Ukraine. It belongs to Sambir urban hromada, one of the hromadas of Ukraine.

The village was established in 1395. A Catholic parish was established before 1483. In the interwar period the village belonged to Poland and was inhabited by around 1,500 people, mostly Poles.
