= Oskar Piotrowski (chess player) =

Polish chess player

Oskar Piotrowski, was a Polish chess master.

In 1902, he played in several chess tournaments in Berlin; took 2nd, behind Eduard Dyckhoff, in the Berlin Finckenschaft-Turnier, tied for 4-5th in the Café Kerkau Free Tournament (Curt von Bardeleben won), lost a game to Ranneforth in a match Anderssen Chess Club vs. Berlin Finckenschaft Club, tied for 2nd-3rd with Erich Cohn, behind Ossip Bernstein, in the Berlin Summer Tournament - Section I (Quadrangular), and shared 2nd with Moritz Lewitt, behind Bernstein, in the 1st Tournament of the General Chess Federation of Berlin. In that year, he took 20th in Hanover in the 13th DSB Congress (Hauptturnier A, Walter John won).

He won twice in the Lemberg City championship in 1912 and 1914. After World War I, he was one of the leading Lviv chess masters, along with Ignatz von Popiel, Kalikst Morawski, and Henryk Friedman. He took 4th in Lviv-ch in 1929 (Stepan Popel won), and won at Lviv 1933 (LKSzach).

An engineer Oskar Piotrowski was a delegate from Lviv at a meeting held in Warsaw on April 11, 1926, to establish the Polish Chess Federation (PZSzach). He was a member of the board of the federation in the period from 1926 to 1935.

He was a double-ganger of Ostap Ortwin.
