= Stepan Popel =

- Степан Попель
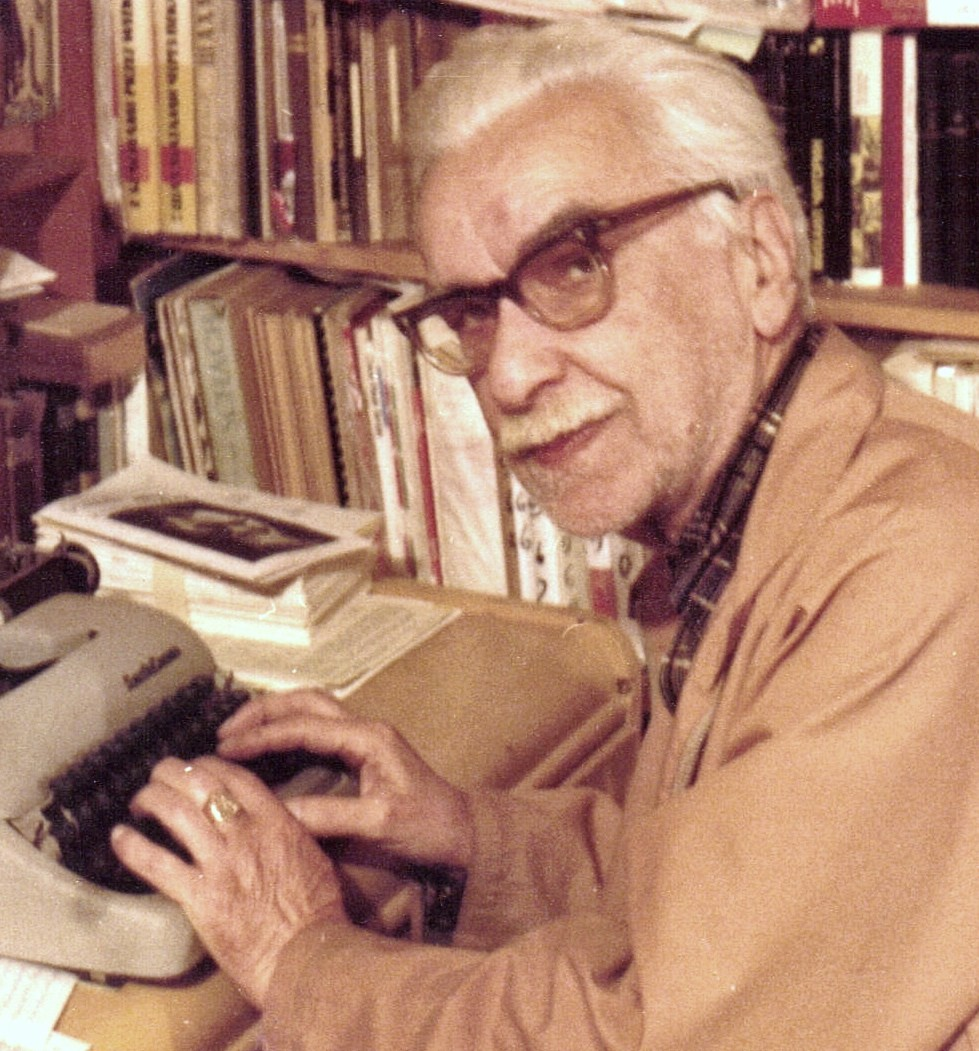
- Stephan Popel in the 1970s
- Born: August 15, 1909; Komarnyky, Austria-Hungary (now Ukraine)
- Died: December 27, 1987 (aged 78); Fargo, North Dakota, United States
- Occupation: Chess player

Stepan Mykhailovych Popel (Note: Ukrainian: Степан Михайлович Попель, romanized: Stepan Mykhailovych Popel) (August 15, 1909 – December 27, 1987) was a multiple chess champion of Lviv, Paris, and eventually of the Ukrainians in North America (USA and Canada).

== Biography ==
Stepan Popel was born in Komarnyky, Galicia, Austria-Hungary (now Ukraine) in 1909, the nephew of an early master, Ignatz von Popiel (1863–1941), and took a liking to chess at an early age – he played in his first tournament at age 12. He went on to become the best chess player in the region and is now regarded as one of the important masters of pre-World War II Europe. In 1931, he earned a master's degree in French and Latin language and literature from the University at Lviv. He also acted, during WW II, Greek-Catholic Metropolitan Andrew Sheptytsky’s personal secretary until 1944.

In 1929, Popel won a championship of Lviv, followed by E. Kaufman, Henryk Friedman, Oskar Piotrowski, etc. In 1929 and 1934, he was a member of Lviv team at 1st and 2nd Polish team championships. In 1934, he was a member of Polish team at Correspondence Olympiad. In 1935–1936, he took 9th at Correspondence Championship of Poland.

In 1943, Popel published his handbook Poczatki szachista (Introduction to Chess) in Ukrainian at Kraków. In 1943, he tied for 1st with Myroslav Turiansky at Lviv (GG). In 1943, he won at Sambor (GG). In 1944, he won at Sanok (GG). Because of the Red Army's approach, he did manage to avoid deportation to Siberia or any worse fate during the Soviet occupation (e.g., that of Vladimirs Petrovs). Joining the westward exodus in 1944, Stepan Popel wound up in Kraków. In 1944, he drew a match against Fedor Bogatyrchuk at Kraków (2–2). At the end of war, he escaped to West. Finally, he came to France.

In 1950–51, Popel won at Hastings (Premier Reserve Major). In 1951, he won the 26th Paris City Chess Championship. In 1951–52, he tied for 4th–6th at Hastings. In April 1953, he won, ahead of Maurice Raizman, the 28th Championship of Paris. In 1954, he won the 29th Championship of Paris. In 1954, he took 4th at Saarbrücken. In 1954–55, he played at international tournament at Paris. In 1955–56, he took 2nd at Hastings (The Premier Reserves Major).

In 1956, Popel was authorized to migrate to the US. As an American master, he won three times the Michigan state championship, in 1957, 1958, and 1959. He also won the North Central Open at Wisconsin in 1957, where his young competitor Bobby Fischer took 6th place. In 1958, he took 4th at North Central Open, and took 6th at Western Open. Both those events were won by Pal Benko. Around 1960, Stepan Popel became a professor of French language and literature at North Dakota State University in Fargo. He continued to enter tournaments, and he became eleven-time North Dakota champion (from 1965 to 1980). In 1966, he took 2nd at a championship of Ukrainian Sport Centrale of America & Canada. In 1969, he won a championship of USCA&C. In 1970, he took 3rd at North Central Open. Popel played the US Open at Lincoln 1969, Atlantic City 1972, Chicago 1973, Columbus 1977. In 1986, he tied for 5th–8th at a championship of USCA&C. The event was won by Orest Popovych.

Popel died in 1987 in Fargo, North Dakota, USA, and is buried there. But his childhood town hasn't forgotten him. In 1996, the now Ukrainian city of Lviv hosted their first International Chess Tournament in memory of Stepan Popel.

== Notable chess games ==
- Stepan Popel vs Czarnecki, Paris 1947, Grünfeld Defense, D94, 1-0
- Stepan Popel vs Daniel Yanofsky, Hastings 1951/52, King's Indian Attack, Wahls Defense, A11, 1/2-1/2
- Harry Golombek vs Stepan Popel, Hastings 1951/52, English Opening, A16, 0-1
- Maurice Raizman vs Stepan Popel, Paris 1953, Neo-Grünfeld Defense, Main line, D79, 0-1
- Robert James Fischer vs Stephan Popel, Oklahoma City 1956, US-Open, King's Indian Attack, Symmterical Defense, A05, 1/2-1/2
