= Ignatz von Popiel =

Polish-Ukrainian chess player (1863–1941)

Ignatz von Popiel (also Ignaz, Ignacy; Ukrainian: Ігнац фон Попель; 27 July 1863 – 2 May 1941) was a Polish-Ukrainian chess player.

== Biography ==
Born into a noble family in Drohobych, Galicia (then Austria-Hungary), he began study law at the University of Graz (Karl-Franzens-Universität Graz). Then started his chess career in Vienna, where he took 10th in 1886, took 2nd in 1887 (Glaser Schachgesellschaft), and took 2nd in 1888. In the period between 1889 and 1892, he studied law at the Jagiellonian University in Kraków. In 1889, he tied for 3rd-4th (elim.) and tied for 5th-6th at Breslau (the 6th DSB Congress, Hauptturnier B, Emanuel Lasker won). In 1892, he tied for 1-3rd (elim.) and took 7th in Dresden (the 7th DSB-Congress, Hauptturnier A).

In 1895, he won in the Lvov Chess Club championship. In 1896, he tied for 2nd-3rd in Eisenach (the 10th DSB-Congress), took 13th in Budapest, and won in Lviv. In 1897, he tied for 1st-2nd (elim.) and won in Berlin. In 1898, he tied for 10th-11th in Cologne (the 11th DSB-Congress). In 1899-1900, he took 9th in Vienna. In 1900, he tied for 11th-12th in Munich (the 12th DSB-Congress). In 1902, he took 16th in Monte Carlo, and took 18th in Hannover (the 13th DSB-Congress).

In 1904, he took 3rd in the Lvov City championship, and 3rd in Lvov (Quadrangular). In 1905, he drew a match with Oskar Piotrowski (+3 –3 =3). He took 5th at Lvov 1912, and took 2nd, behind Piotrowski, in the Lvov City championship in 1914.

During World War I, in 1915, he took 6th at Vienna. After the war, Popiel was one of the strongest chess players in Lvov, Poland. He participated several times in the Lvov City championship; took 2nd in 1925, tied for 2nd-4th in 1926, tied for 2nd-3rd in 1927, took 8th in 1931, and took 14th in 1933. Playing in a pre-Olympic tournament at Lodz 1935 took 13th place. In 1937 he left Lvov for Bochnia, and tied for 5-7th in the Kraków City championship. He died on 2 May 1941 in General Government, Poland.

He was the uncle of Stepan Popel, a Ukrainian chess master.

== Notable chess games ==
- Emanuel Lasker vs Ignatz von Popiel, Breslau 1889, Vienna Game, Mieses Variation, C26, 0-1
- Ignatz von Popiel vs Dawid Janowski, Cologne 1898, DSB 11th Kongress (GER ch.), Sicilian Defense, Pin Variation, B40, 1-0
- Ignatz von Popiel vs Georg Marco, Monte Carlo 1902, Philidor Defense, C41, 1-0
