= Sambir urban hromada =

Urban hromada in Lviv Oblast, Ukraine

Sambir urban hromada Самбірська міська громада
- Hromada
- Seal
- Interactive map of Sambir urban hromada
- Coordinates: 49°31′0″N 23°12′10″E
- Country: Ukraine
- Oblast: Lviv Oblast
- Raion: Sambir Raion
- Admin. center: Sambir

Area
  - Total: 42.2 km^{2} (16.3 sq mi)

Population (2022)
  - Total: 36,659
  - Density: 869/km^{2} (2,250/sq mi)
- CATOTTG code: UA46080130000077112
- Settlements: 5
- Cities: 1
- Villages: 4

Sambir urban territorial hromada (Ukrainian: Самбірська міська територіальна громада, romanized: Sambirska miska terytorialna hromada) is an urban hromada (municipality) in the Lviv Oblast of western Ukraine. Its administrative centre is the city of Sambir.

Sambir urban hromada has an area of 42.2 square kilometres (16.3 mi^{2}). It also has a population of 36,659 (2022 estimate).

Until 18 July 2020, Sambir was incorporated as a city of oblast significance and served as the administrative centre of Sambir Raion, though it did not actually belong to the raion. In July 2020, as part of the administrative reform of Ukraine, which reduced the number of raions of Lviv Oblast to seven, the city of Sambir was merged into Sambir Raion.

== Settlements ==
In addition to the city of Sambir, the hromada includes four villages:

- Biloky
- Vanovychi
- Dubrivka
- Strilkovychi
