= Borynia settlement hromada =

Hromada in Lviv Oblast, Ukraine

Borynia settlement hromada Боринська селищна громада
- Hromada
- Seal
- Interactive map of Borynia settlement hromada
- Country: Ukraine
- Oblast: Lviv Oblast
- Raion: Sambir Raion
- Admin. center: Borynia

Area
  - Total: 638 km^{2} (246 sq mi)

Population (2021)
  - Total: 23,371
  - Density: 36.6/km^{2} (94.9/sq mi)
- Settlements: 33
- Rural settlements: 1
- Villages: 32
- Website: borynyatg.gov.ua

Borynia settlement hromada (Ukrainian: Боринська селищна громада) is a hromada in Ukraine, in Sambir Raion of Lviv Oblast. The administrative center is the rural settlement of Borynia.

== Settlements ==
The hromada consists of 1 rural settlement (Borynia) and 32 villages:

- Bahnuvate
- Beniova
- Bitlia
- Boberka
- Bukovynka
- Verkhnie
- Verkhnie Vysotske
- Verkhnie Husne
- Verkhnii Turiv
- Verkhnia Yablunka
- Zakychera
- Zarichchia
- Zvorets
- Ivashkivtsi
- Karpatske
- Komarnyky
- Kryvka
- Lybokhora
- Mezhyhiria
- Nyzhnie
- Nyzhnie Vysotske
- Nyzhnie Husne
- Nyzhnii Turiv
- Nyzhnia Yablunka
- Rykiv
- Ropavske
- Syhlovate
- Sianky
- Shandrovets
- Shtukovets
- Yabluniv
- Yavoriv
