= Ralivka =

Rural locality in Lviv Oblast, Ukraine

Ralivka Ралівка
- Village
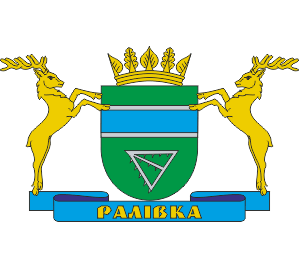
- Coat of arms

- Location within Lviv Oblast Location within Ukraine
- Coordinates: 49°30′29″N 23°14′59″E
- Country: Ukraine
- Oblast: Lviv
- Raion: Sambir
- Area: 10.55 km^{2} (4.07 sq mi)
- Population: 4,058
  - Density: 384.6/km^{2} (996.2/sq mi)

Ralivka (Ukrainian: Ралівка, Polish: Radłowice) is a village (selo) in Sambir Raion, Lviv Oblast, in south-west Ukraine. It hosts the administration of Ralivka rural hromada, one of the hromadas of Ukraine.

On the northern tip of the village, an abandoned Catholic church (from the late 19th century) and an Orthodox church from 1938, are located.

At the end of the 19th century, the village was located in the Sambir County.

In the Second Polish Republic, the village was part of the Sambir County in the Lwów Voivodeship.

Between 1943 and 1944, Ukrainian nationalists from the OUN-UPA brutally murdered 10 Poles here as a part of Volhynia genocide.

In Radłowice, the starosta Kazimierz Lenczewski (1882–1938) was buried.
