= Stryi (river) =

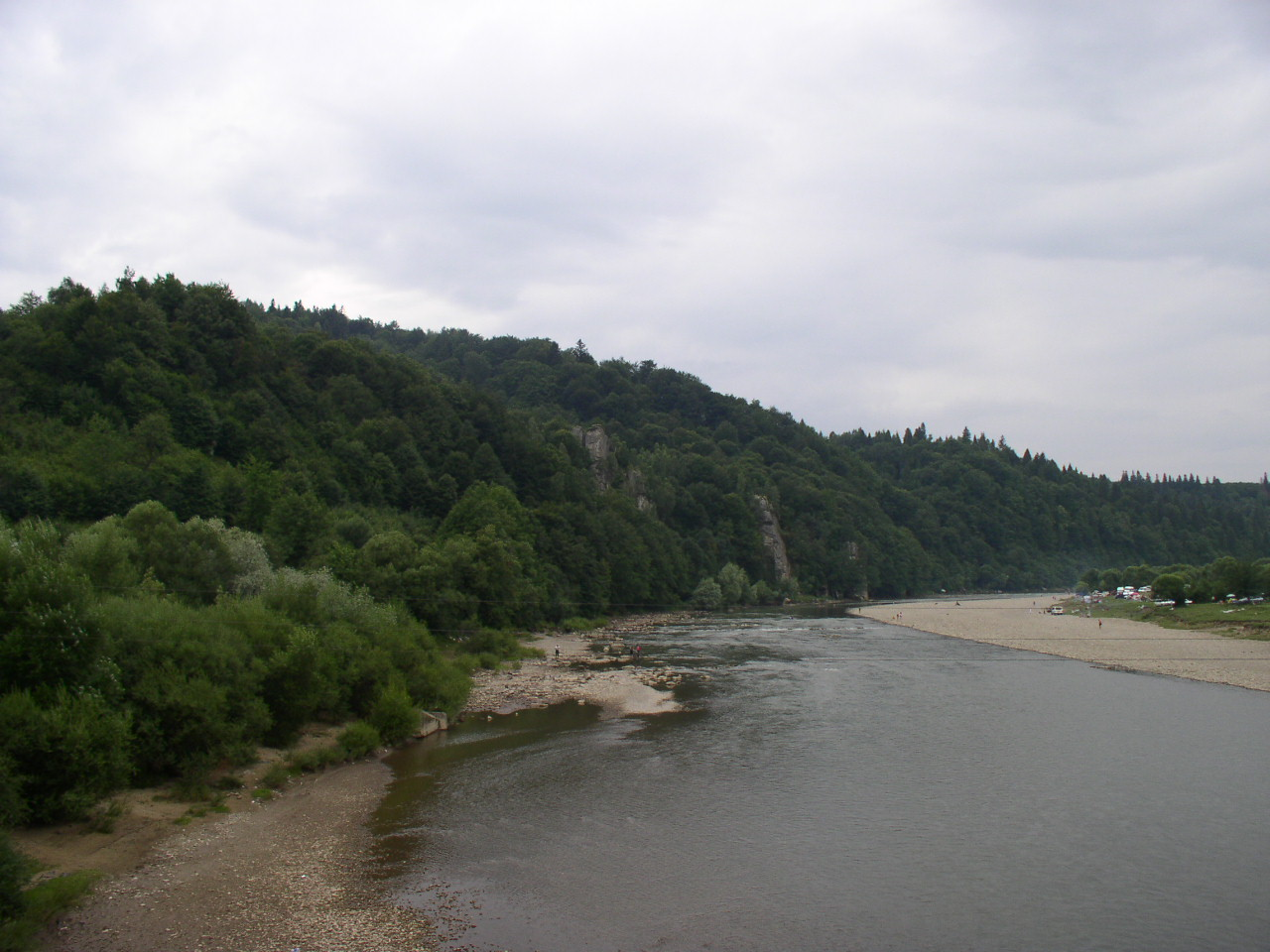
- The Stryi River

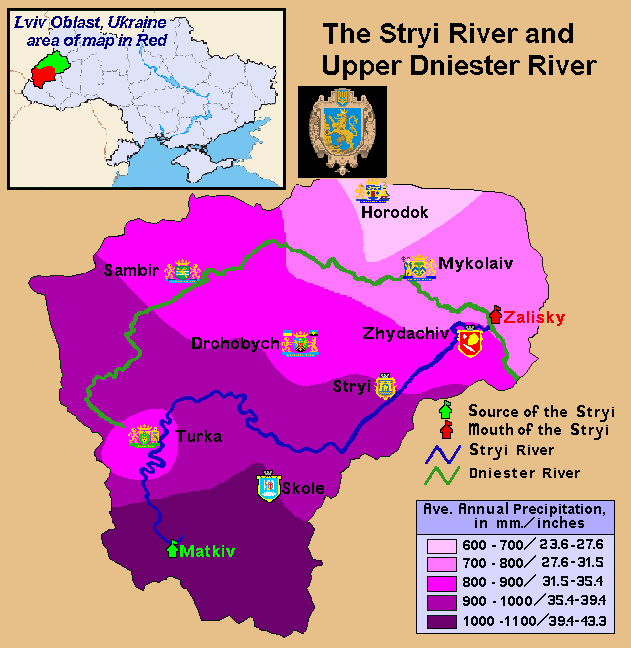
- Map of the Stryi River with Raion Administrative cities indicated by their respective coats of arms
- Etymology: Str, Scythian
- Native name: Стрий (Ukrainian)

Location
- Country: Ukraine

Physical characteristics
- Source
  - location: Mokhnate, Lviv Oblast, Ukraine
  - coordinates: 48°55′56.57″N 23°08′14.59″E
- Mouth: Dniester
  - location: Khodoriv
- Length: 231 km (144 mi)
- Basin size: 3,055 km^{2} (1,180 sq mi)

Basin features
- Progression: Dniester→ Dniester Estuary→ Black Sea

The Stryi (Ukrainian: Стрий) is a river in western Ukraine. It starts in the Carpathian Mountains and snakes through the mountains running for 231 kilometres (144 mi). After 193 kilometres (120 mi) it passes Stryi. The river continues for another 32 kilometres (20 mi) before joining the Dniester near Khodoriv.

== Route ==
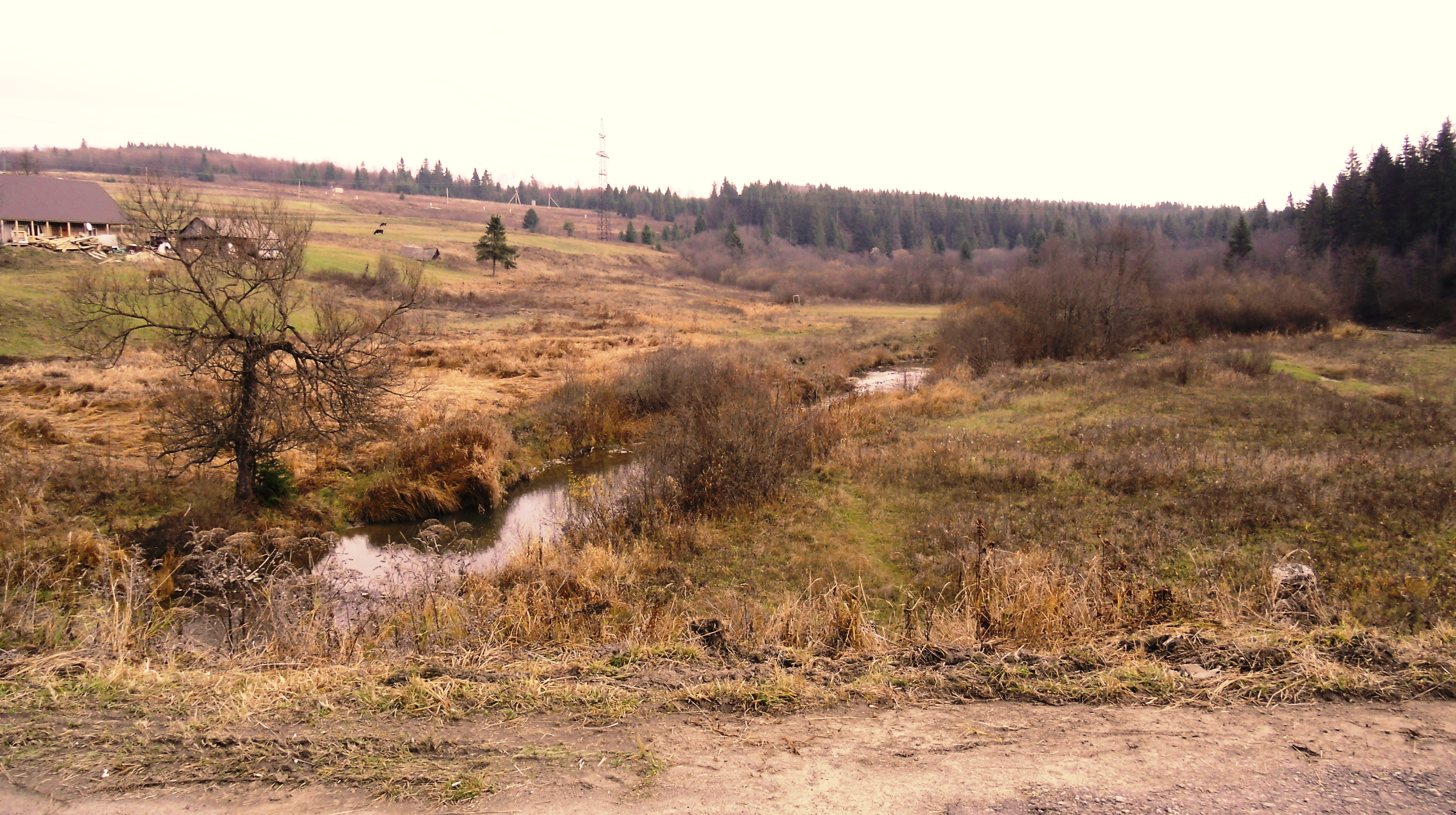
Stryj River near the village of Klymets. Skole district.

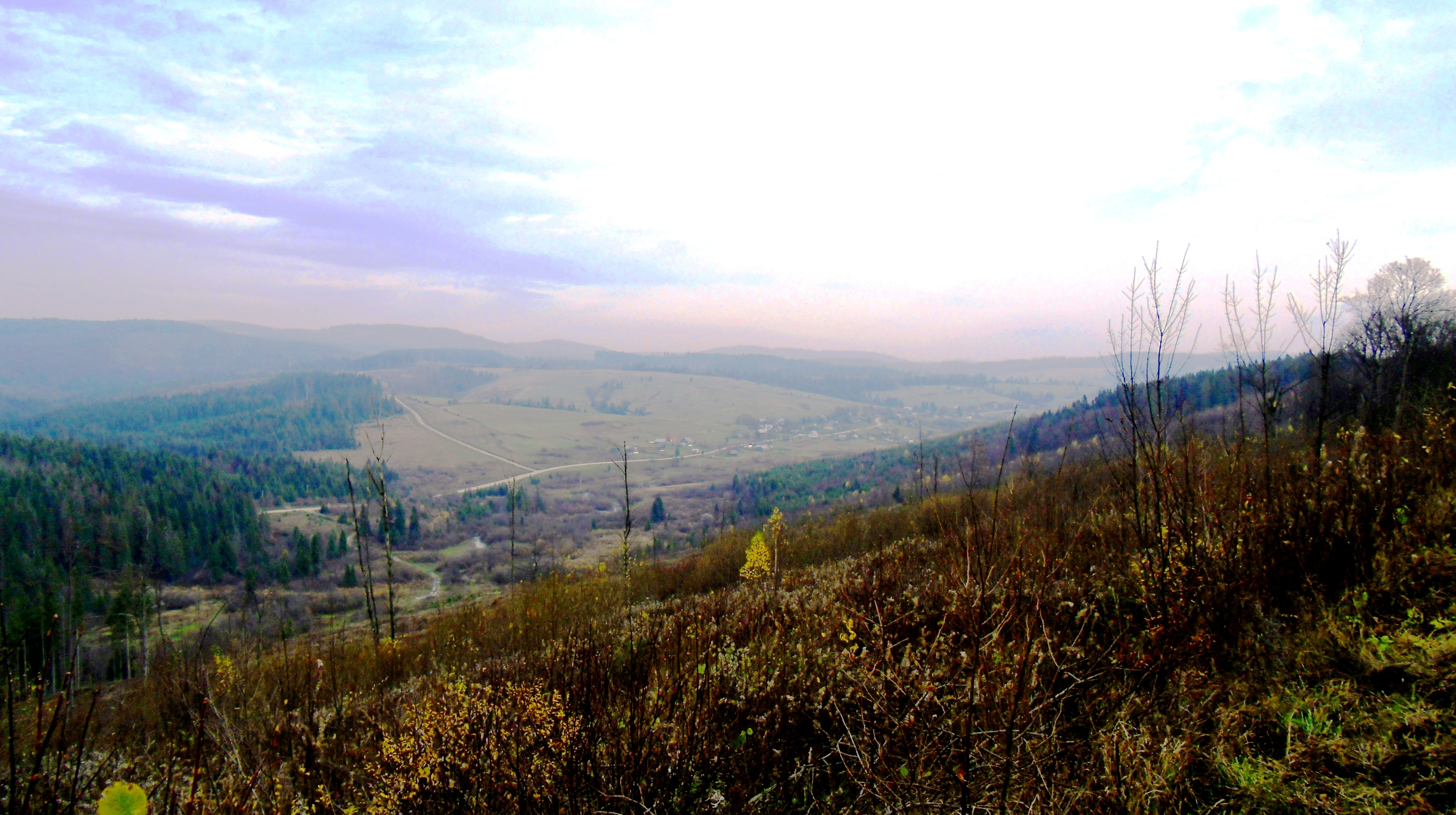
The upper reaches of the river Stryi.

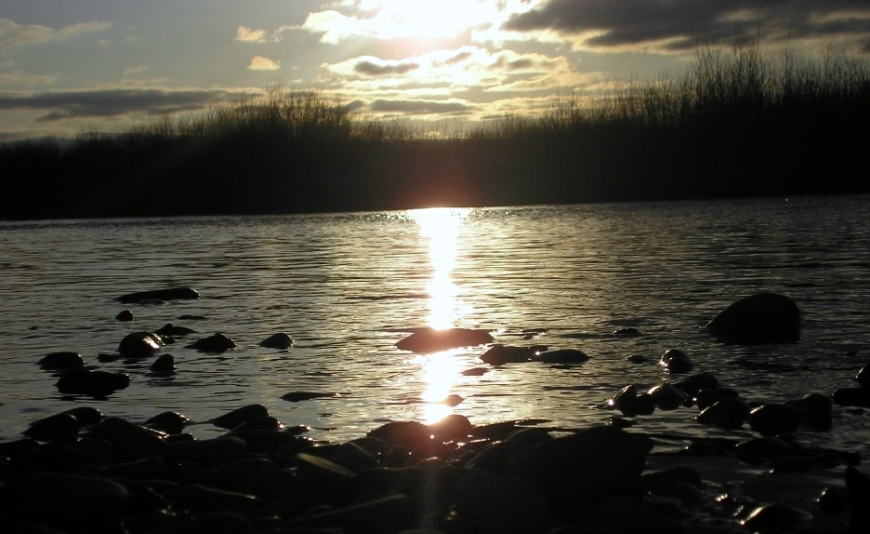
Stryi River at night near the village Hnizdychiv

The river starts in a catchment area above and in the foothills of the Eastern Beskids range of the Carpathian Mountains close to the village of Mokhnate, flowing down the East facing flank of the range. From here it begins to grow, being joined by many tributaries on its way North, before flowing into a series of twists and turns through gorges. It exits the hills reaching a flat area around Turka, where there was an attempt at hydro electric generation and flood control.

The river meanders through the hills to Pidhorodci where it meets another main tributary the Opir at Nyzhnye Synievydne. From here it begins to straighten, 3.5 km south east of the town, at the start of the Stryi valley where it flows in an almost straight line past Duliby and Stryi and on to Zhydachiv. Here the river reaches a flat area and meanders wildly meeting the Dniester on the Eastern side of the Zhydachiv town causing many oxbow lakes.

== Geology ==
The rocks in the area, known as the Stryi Depression, are arranged in three main layers. The river follows a natural fault line and is around an average of 60 feet wide, but is shallow at only an average of 10 feet deep in summer until its lower tracts where it reaches depths of 20 feet or more.

The three layers of rocks types give the Stryi its unique form, in the upper tracts it flows through several areas of hard dense rocks and in between these through softer shales and alluvial deposits. As a consequence the river bed is mostly medium-sized rounded rocks and pebbles with islands of sand and rounded gravels in midstream in the middle and lower tracts.

== Behaviour ==
The river is a popular destination for canoeing as it has many rapids in the upper tracts, as well as areas of beauty along its lower course. The river is noted for its quick and massive increases in both flow volume and speed during rain, which often cause bridges and the river itself to be impassable. This results in flooded roads and train lines which, in these mountainous areas, tend to be close to the river.

This has quite an effect on transportation, even causing the halt of the Russian forces in the first world war on 8 July 1917 as they tried to drive the Germans from the Austro-Hungarian army out of the region.

There have been attempts to use the river for generating Hydro-electric power, but at the present time there are no current plans to re-introduce their use.

The name derives from the Scythian word "Str", meaning fast. Where the Opir and Stryi meet, there is a legend that the Ukrainian "Robin Hood", Oleksa Dovbush was wounded, and his blood stained the riverbank causing the red rocks that can be seen there today.

== Historical significance ==
The Stryi was used as a northern barrier for the Russian Carpathian Front during the first world war. According to the New York Times Current History and Forum periodical, the river was at the edge of an area the Russian army was using to prevent the Austrian forces advance. "It was noted last week that the Russian line formed a huge crescent, the longer arc of which (and this was the Carpathian front) extended from Bartfeld north, then east along the Carpathian crests, north of Uzsok to a point on the Stryi River."
