= Turka, Ukraine =

City in Lviv Oblast, Ukraine

Turka Турка
- City
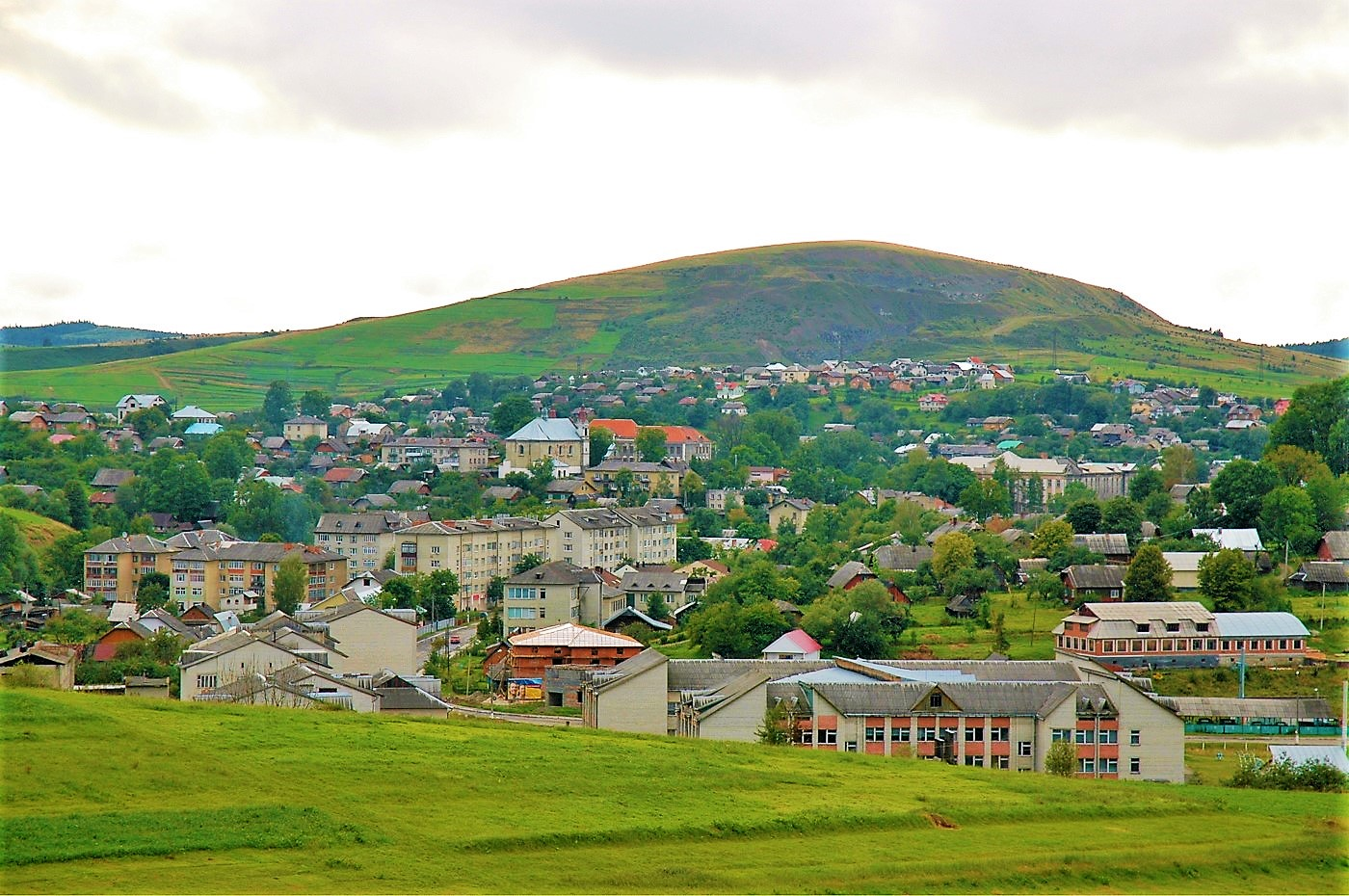
- Turka panoramic view

- Flag Coat of arms

- Location of Turka Turka (Ukraine)
- Coordinates: 49°09′27″N 23°01′21″E
- Country: Ukraine
- Oblast: Lviv Oblast
- Raion: Sambir Raion
- Hromada: Turka urban hromada
- First mentioned: 1431

Government
  - Mayor: Yaroslav Parashchych
- Elevation: 557 m (1,827 ft)

Population (2022)
  - Total: 6,925
- Postal code: 82500
- Area code: +380
- Website: https://turka-mrada.gov.ua/

Turka (Ukrainian: Турка, IPA: [ˈturkɐ]; Polish: Turka; Yiddish: טורקא), formerly known as Turka nad Stryiom (Ukrainian: Турка над Стрийом; Polish: Turka nad Stryjem) is a city located at the confluence of the Stryi River and the Yablunka River in Sambir Raion, Lviv Oblast, western Ukraine. It is located by the Carpathian Mountains. It hosts the administration of Turka urban hromada, one of the hromadas of Ukraine. Population: 6,925 (2022 estimate).

Until 18 July 2020, Turka belonged to Turka Raion and was the administrative center. The raion was abolished in July 2020 as part of the administrative reform of Ukraine, which reduced the number of raions of Lviv Oblast to seven.

== Name ==
The name Turka originates from Ukrainian word, тур (tur), meaning aurochs or urus (Latin: Bos primigenius), the ancestor of domestic cattle — a type of huge wild cattle which inhabited in the surrounding forests (it survived in Europe until 1627). In another version the city's name derives from the Ukrainian name of the gate-towers, "Turia" (Ukrainian: Tурія), "Turja" (Ukrainian: Тур'я), "Turnia" (Ukrainian: Турня), which stood at the entrance to an ancient settlement.

The origin of the name may also be linked to the Turks since the area was under the Hun Empire and they are considered as ancestors of Turks. Also, Turkic tribes were nomadic, settling in various places and assimilating.

== Geography ==
=== Location ===
The city is located in the south Lviv Oblast, in the Carpathian Mountains, on the left bank of the Stryi River, with its tributaries, the Yablunka River (Ukrainian: Яблунька) and Litmyr River (Ukrainian: Літмир), and between the mountains Shymenka (Ukrainian: Шименка), Kychera (Ukrainian: Кичера), Vinets' (Ukrainian: Вінець) and Osovnya (Ukrainian: Осовня).

The city is located 137 km from Lviv, 107 km from Uzhhorod, 75 km from Drohobych, at an altitude of 557 meters above sea level. The location of initial settlement outpost, from which arose Turka, was determined by the so-called "Path of Rus" - Neolithic trade route that connected through the Turka Western Europe to Hungary, Moldova and the Balkan countries.

== History ==
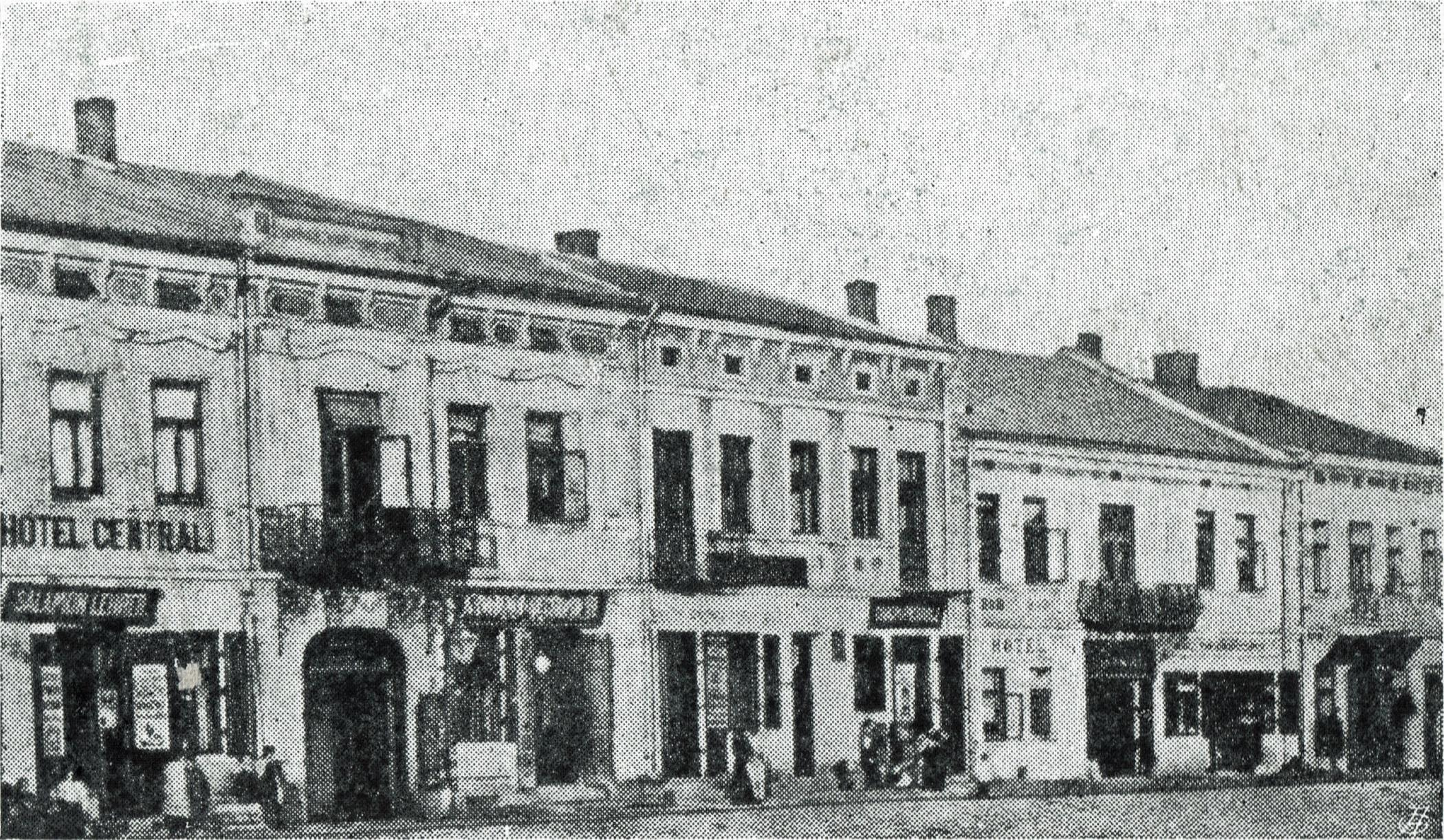
Turka in the early 20th century

On June 27, 1431, King Władysław II Jagiełło presented Turka to a man named Vancza Valachus. This was confirmed in 1444 by King Władysław III of Poland, and by Sigismund I the Old in 1517. In 1730 Turka received Magdeburg rights, and three years later, a Roman Catholic parish was opened here. Turka was administratively located in the Przemyśl Land, Ruthenian Voivodeship, Lesser Poland Province of the Kingdom of Poland. Following the First Partition of Poland, from 1772 to 1918 the town belonged to Austrian Galicia.

In the Second Polish Republic, Turka was the seat of a county in Lwów Voivodeship. It was home to a county court, private high school and tax office. At that time, its starosta was Tadeusz Zawistowski, and the mayor was Michał Grudziński.

Following the September 1939 Invasion of Poland, Turka was occupied by the Soviet Union. In June 1941, the town was captured by the Wehrmacht, and its Jewish population was murdered in the Holocaust. After World War II, the town was reattached to the Soviet Ukraine, and its Polish community was expelled to the so-called Recovered Territories.

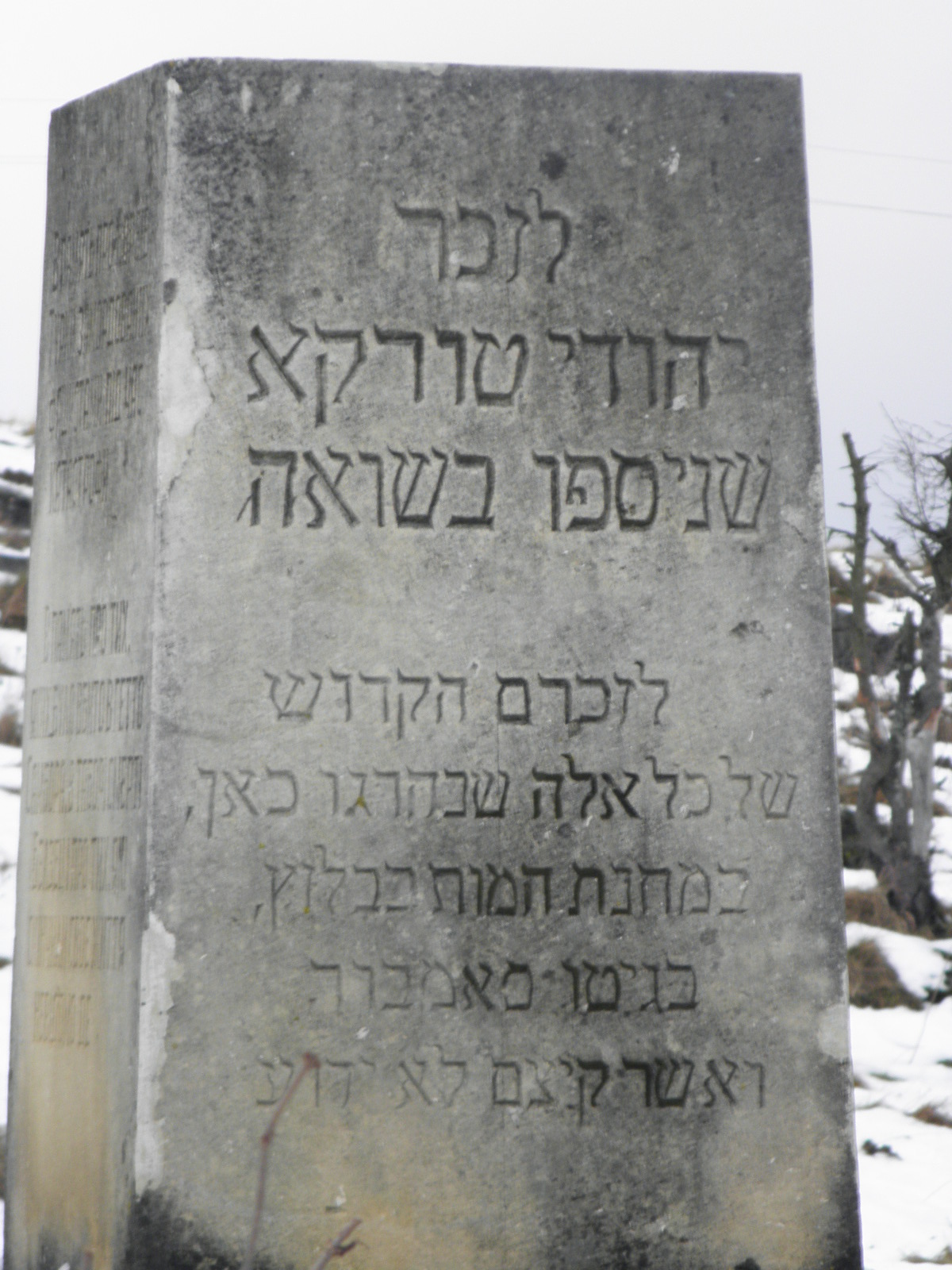
Monument to the Jews of Turka who perished in the Holocaust.

Until 18 July 2020, Turka served as the administrative center of Turka Raion. The raion was abolished in July 2020 as part of the administrative reform of Ukraine, which reduced the number of raions of Lviv Oblast to seven. The area of Turka Raion was merged into Sambir Raion.

== Demography ==
Historical population
Year	Pop.	±%
1880	4,685	—
1916	6,080	+29.8%
1921	10,030	+65.0%
1931	10,145	+1.1%
1989	7,982	−21.3%
2001	7,440	−6.8%
2006	7,306	−1.8%
2022	6,925	−5.2%

The population is 7,306 people in 1114 homes (2006) 99% of the population are Ukrainian.
Dynamics of population in the past:

- 1880 — 4,685 inhabitants (1,786 Rusyns, 537 Poles, 2,356 German; of them: 1,837 Greek-Catholic, 450 Catholics, 2,398 Jews).
- 1916 — 6,080 inhabitants (including - 3,000 Jews)
- 1921 — 10,030 inhabitants (52.4% Polish, 29.2% Ukrainian, 18.3% Jewish by nationality, 58.0% Catholic (Roman or Greek rite) and 41.9% Jewish by religion)
- 1989 — 7,982 inhabitants (3,992 male, 3,990 female)
- 2001 — 7,440 inhabitants (99.35% Ukrainians, 0.46% Russians, 0.19% others)

== Sights ==
- Church of the transfer of the relics of St. Nicholas, Turka (1776)
- Church of St. Nicholas, Turka (1739)
- Assumption of the Blessed Virgin Mary Church, Turka (1750)
- Protection of the Blessed Virgin Mary Church, Turka (1780)
- Church of Saints Peter and Paul, Turka (2003)
- Assumption Church, Turka (1778)
- Synagogue, Turka (19th century)
- Old Jewish Cemetery, Turka (19th century)
- Market Square, Turka
- Folk Museum of Boykos, Boykivshchyna (Ukrainian: Бойківщина)
- Museum of Boykos books

== Notable people ==
- Abba Hushi (1898—1969) — Israeli politician, mayor of Haifa (1951–1969)
- Mykhailo Melnyk (1889—1944) — Ukrainian military and political leader
- Stepan Popel (1907—1987) — Ukrainian and American chess player, multiple chess champion of Lviv, Paris and eventually, of the Ukrainians in North America (United States and Canada)
- Yuriy Tarnawsky (1934) — Ukrainian poet and novelist, one of the founding members of the New York Group, a Ukrainian émigré avant-garde group of writers, and co-founder and co-editor of the journal Novi Poeziyi (New Poetry; 1959–1972)
- Yuriy Velykanovych (1910-1938) - Ukrainian Communist activist, member of the International Brigades during the Spanish Civil War
