= Turka Raion =

Former subdivision of Lviv Oblast, Ukraine

Turka Raion Турківський район
- Raion
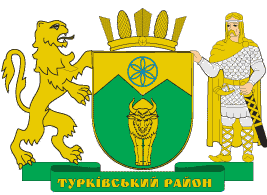
- Flag Coat of arms

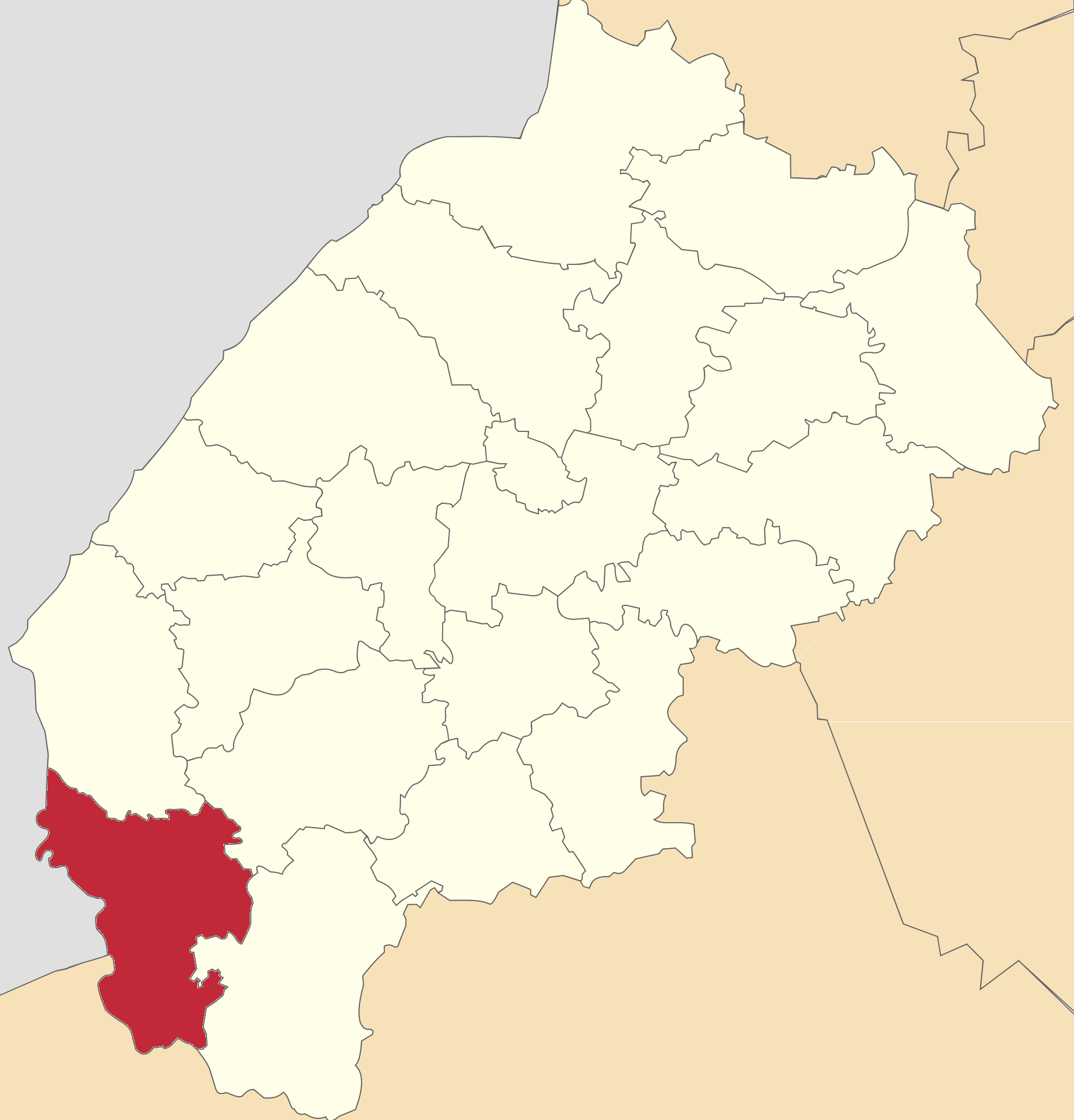
- Coordinates: 49°5′26″N 23°0′57″E
- Country: Ukraine
- Region: Lviv Oblast
- Established: 1939
- Disestablished: 18 July 2020
- Admin. center: Turka
- Subdivisions: List: — city councils; — settlement councils; — rural councils; Number of localities: — cities; — urban-type settlements; 65 — villages; — rural settlements

Area
  - Total: 1,193 km^{2} (461 sq mi)

Population (2020)
  - Total: 48,933
  - Density: 41.02/km^{2} (106.2/sq mi)
- Time zone: UTC+02:00 (EET)
  - Summer (DST): UTC+03:00 (EEST)
- Postal index: 82500—82566
- Area code: 380-3269
- Website: http://trda.lv.ukrtel.net

Turka Raion (Ukrainian: Турківський район) was a raion (district) in Lviv Oblast in western Ukraine. Its administrative center was the city of Turka. The raion was abolished on 18 July 2020 as part of the administrative reform of Ukraine, which reduced the number of raions of Lviv Oblast to seven. The area of Turka Raion was merged into Sambir Raion. The last estimate of the raion population was 48,933 (2020 est.).

It was established in 1939.

At the time of disestablishment, the raion consisted of two hromadas:

- Borynia settlement hromada with the administration in the urban-type settlement of Borynia;
- Turka urban hromada with the administration in Turka.

== See also ==
- Administrative divisions of Lviv Oblast
