= Sambir Raion =

Subdivision of Lviv Oblast, Ukraine

Sambir Raion Самбірський район
- Raion
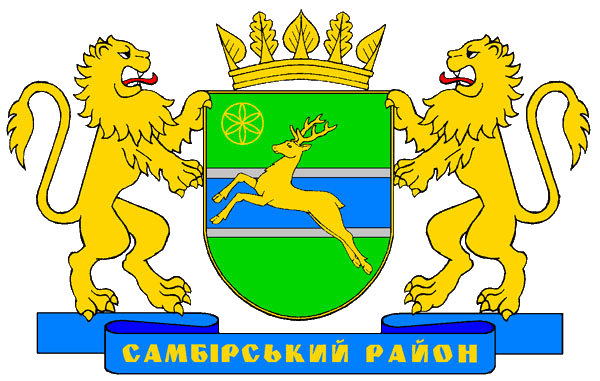
- Flag Coat of arms

- Coordinates: 49°33′4″N 23°19′20″E
- Country: Ukraine
- Oblast: Lviv Oblast
- Established: 8 January 1965
- Admin. center: Sambir
- Subdivisions: 11 hromadas

Area
  - Total: 3,247.1 km^{2} (1,253.7 sq mi)

Population (2022)
  - Total: 221,896
  - Density: 68.337/km^{2} (176.99/sq mi)
- Time zone: UTC+02:00 (EET)
  - Summer (DST): UTC+03:00 (EEST)
- Postal index: 81420—81485
- Area code: 380-3236

Sambir Raion (Ukrainian: Самбірський район) is a raion (district) in Lviv Oblast in western Ukraine. Its administrative center is Sambir. Population: 221,896 (2022 estimate). It was established in 1965.

On 18 July 2020, as part of the administrative reform of Ukraine, the number of raions of Lviv Oblast was reduced to seven, and the area of Sambir Raion was significantly expanded. Two abolished raions, Staryi Sambir and Turka Raions, as well as the city of Sambir, which was previously incorporated as a city of oblast significance and did not belong to the raion, were merged into Sambir Raion. The January 2020 estimate of the raion population was 67,063 (2020 est.).

== Subdivisions ==
=== Current ===
After the reform in July 2020, the raion consisted of 11 hromadas:

- Biskovychi rural hromada with the administration in the selo of Biskovychi, retained from Sambir Raion;
- Borynia settlement hromada with the administration in the rural settlement of Borynia, transferred from Turka Raion;
- Dobromyl urban hromada with the administration in the city of Dobromyl, transferred from Staryi Sambir Raion;
- Khyriv urban hromada with the administration in the city of Khyriv, transferred from Staryi Sambir Raion;
- Novyi Kalyniv urban hromada with the administration in the city of Novyi Kalyniv, retained from Sambir Raion;
- Ralivka rural hromada with the administration in the selo of Ralivka, retained from Sambir Raion;
- Rudky urban hromada with the administration in the city of Rudky, retained from Sambir Raion.
- Sambir urban hromada, transferred from the city of oblast significance of Sambir;
- Staryi Sambir urban hromada with the administration in the city of Staryi Sambir, transferred from Staryi Sambir Raion;
- Strilky rural hromada with the administration in the selo of Strilky, transferred from Staryi Sambir Raion;
- Turka urban hromada with the administration in the city of Turka, transferred from Turka Raion.

=== Before 2020 ===
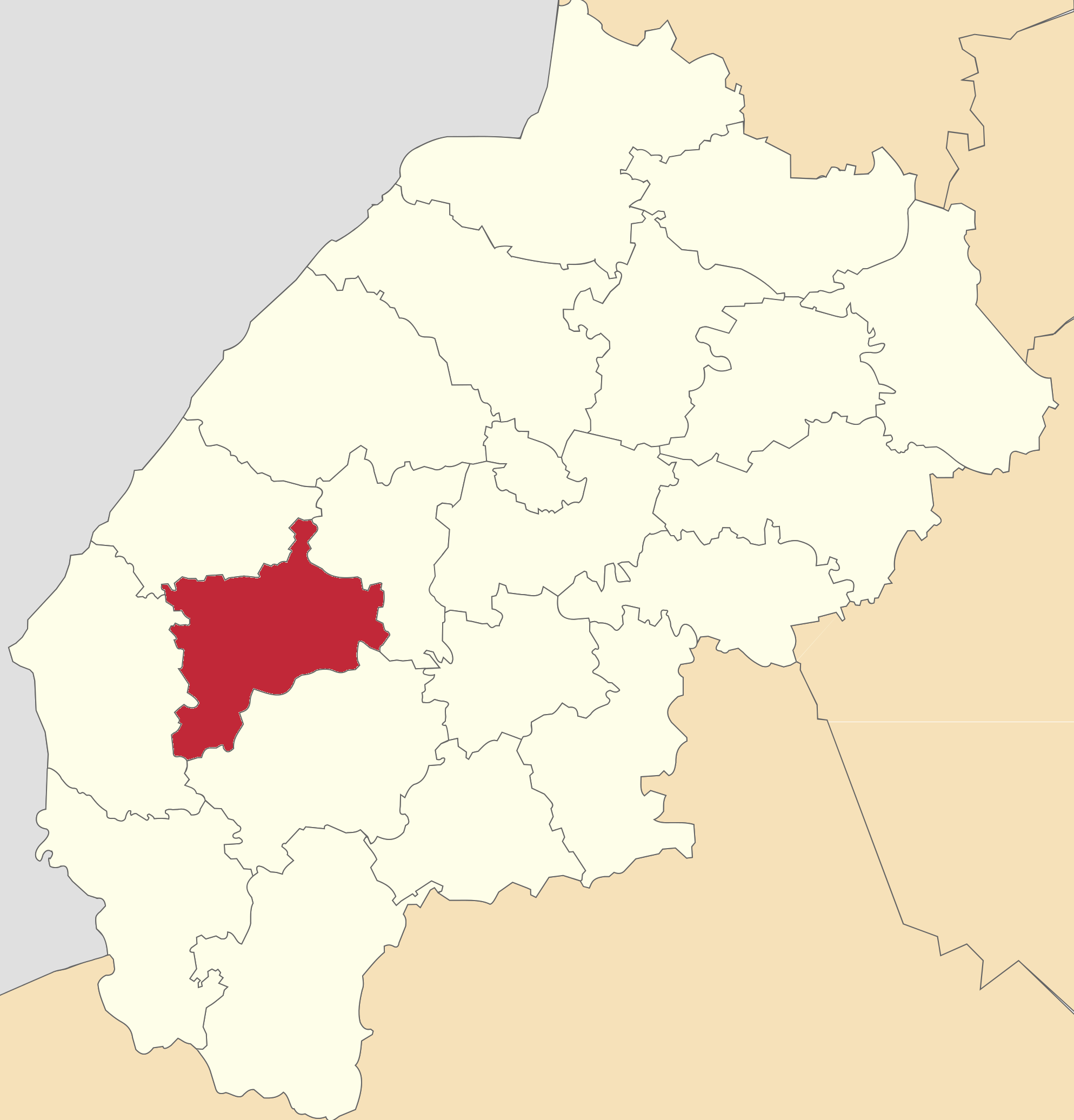
Sambir Raion in Lviv Oblast (1966-2020)

Before the 2020 reform, the raion consisted of four hromadas,

- Biskovychi rural hromada with the administration in Biskovychi;
- Novyi Kalyniv urban hromada with the administration in Novyi Kalyniv;
- Ralivka rural hromada with the administration in Ralivka;
- Rudky urban hromada with the administration in Rudky.

== Settlements in Sambir Raion ==
Sambir Raion consists of 11 territorial hromadas, there are 286 populated places overall, including 7 cities, 4 settlements, and 275 villages.

The cities are:

- Sambir
- Staryi Sambir
- Khyriv
- Turka
- Rudky
- Dobromyl
- Novyi Kalyniv

== People from Sambir Raion ==
- Petro Konashevych-Sahaidachny (1570–1622) — a Ukrainian political and civic leader, Hetman of Ukrainian Zaporozhian Cossacks
- Marko Zhmaylo-Kulchytskyy — Registered Cossacks Hetman (1625), leader of the peasant-Cossack Zhmaylo Uprising in 1625.
- Yuriy Frants Kulchytsky (1640–1694) — Ukrainian political and civic leader.
- Omeljan Pritsak (1919–2006) — Ukrainian-American historian, first Mykhailo Hrushevsky Professor of Ukrainian History at Harvard University, and the founder and first director (1973–1989) of the Harvard Ukrainian Research Institute.
- Walter Chyzowych (1937–1994) — footballer and coach who represented the United States national team
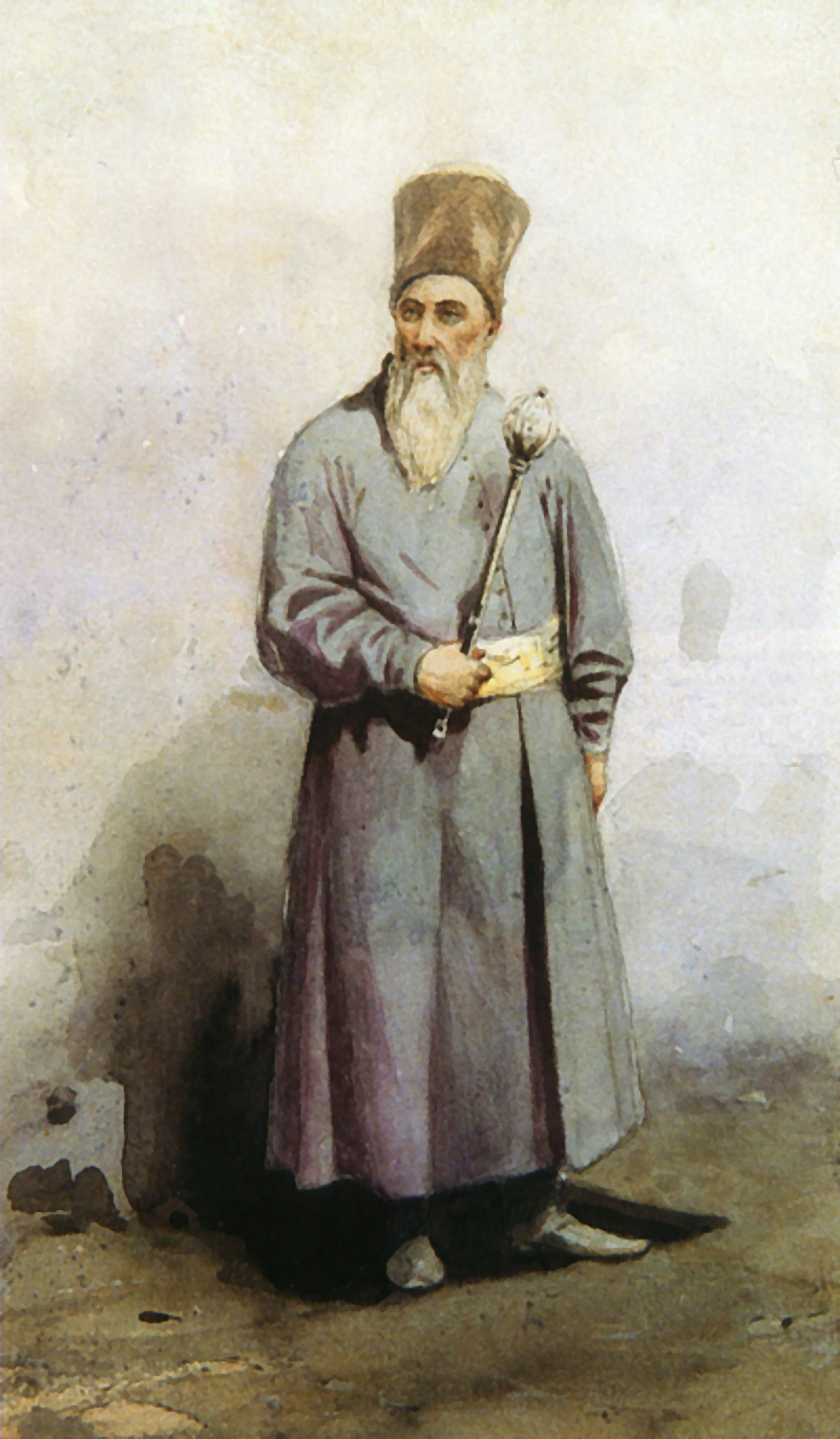
Petro Konashevych-Sahaidachny

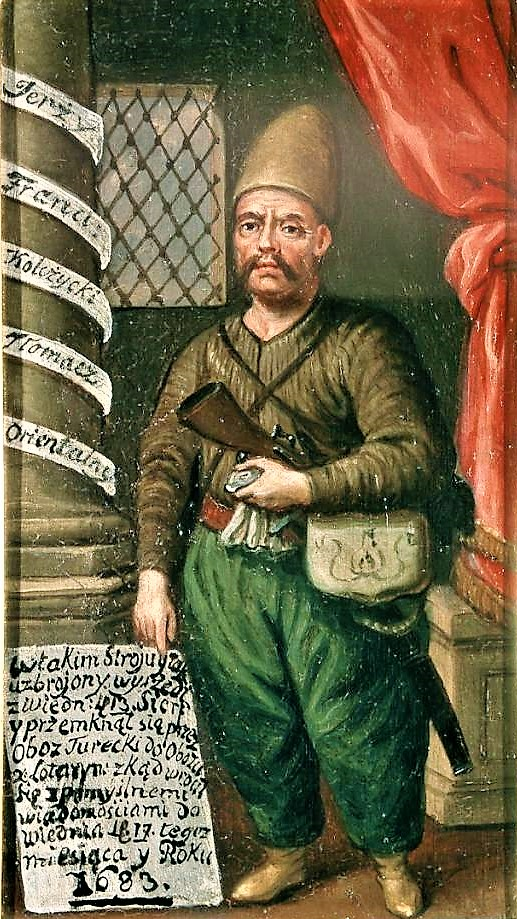
Yuriy Frants Kulchytsky

== See also ==
- Administrative divisions of Lviv Oblast
