= Shevchenkivskyi Hai =

Museum in Lviv, Ukraine

Coordinates: 49.845°N 24.064°E

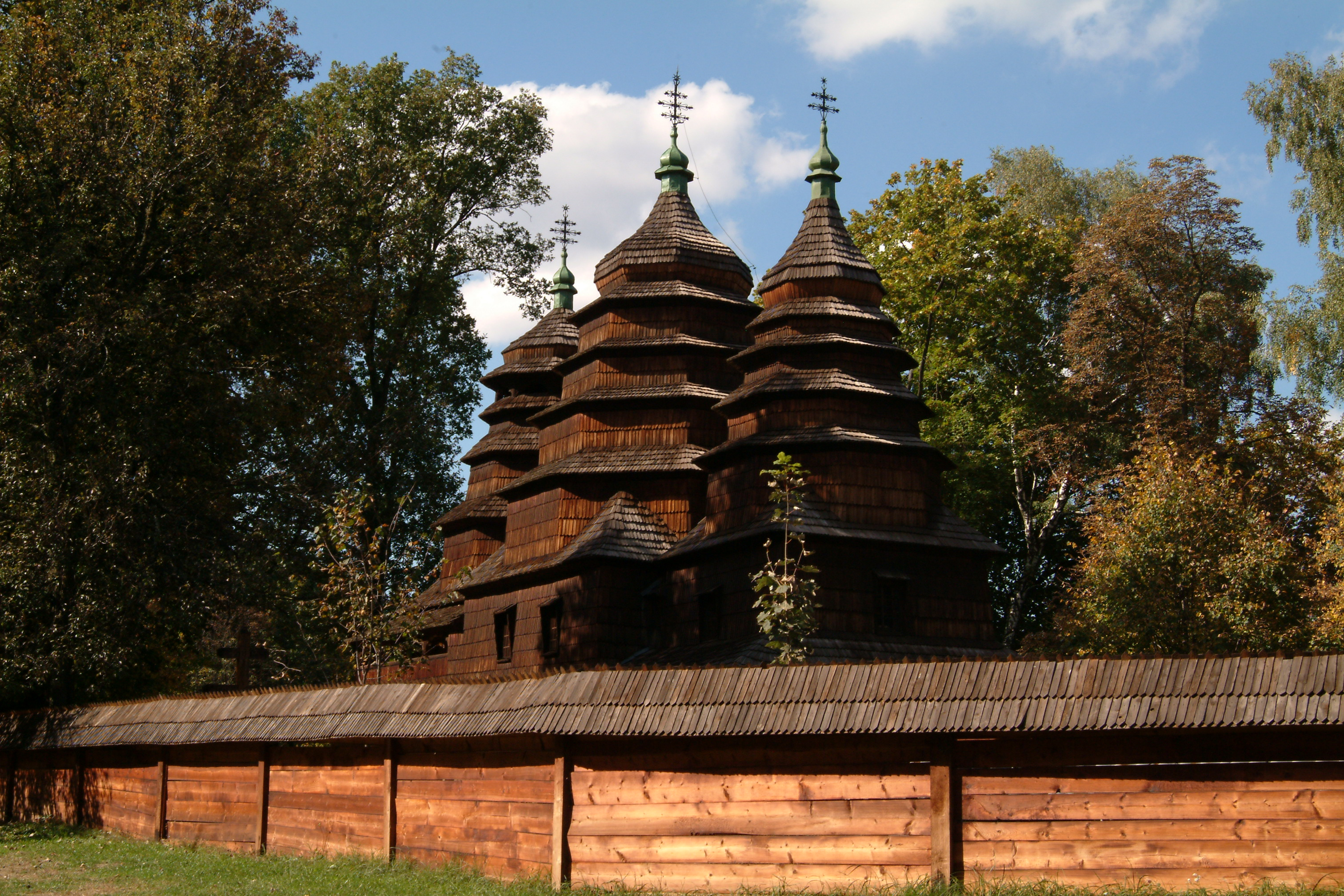
- Saint Nicholas church from Kryvky

The Klymentiy Sheptytsky Museum of Folk Architecture and Rural Life (Ukrainian: Музей народної архітектури та побуту імені Климентія Шептицького), also known as Shevchenkivskyi Hai (Ukrainian: Шевченківський гай) is an open-air museum (skansen) located in Lviv, Ukraine.

== Location ==
The Klymentiy Sheptytsky Museum of Folk Architecture and Rural Life is situated on the wooded hills of the Lviv Plateau (part of the Podolian Upland), in the northeastern part of the city, in the area known as Kaiserwald. It lies within the territory of the Znesinnia Regional Landscape Park. Nearby, to the west, is the High Castle Park.

The museum harmoniously integrates the hilly landscape, restored Carpathian vegetation, and carefully relocated historical buildings from various regions of Western Ukraine. The total area of the park is approximately 84 hectares.

== History ==
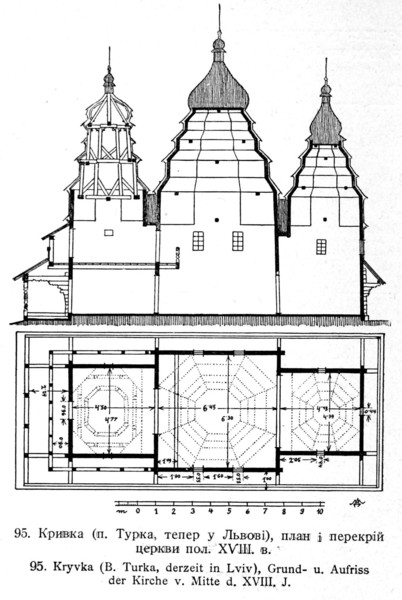
Plan of the church of St. Nicholas from the village of Kryvka

In the spring of 1966, a Department of Folk Construction was established within the Museum of Ethnography and Arts and Crafts, marking the beginning of the work on creating an open-air museum. In 1971, the department was reorganized into the Museum of Folk Architecture and Rural Life, which officially opened to visitors in 1972. The idea of establishing such a museum belonged to the renowned Ukrainian scholar Ilarion Sventsitsky, who had initiated the concept of an open-air museum—similar to the Skansen in Stockholm — as early as the late 1920s.

In the 1920s, when the community of the village of Kryvka decided to dismantle their old wooden Church of St. Nicholas (built in 1761) after the construction of a new one, the Ukrainian art historian and researcher of ancient Ukrainian art, Mykhailo Dragan, with the assistance of the local parish priest Markelii Kunovsky, managed to persuade the villagers to postpone its demolition. Thanks to subsequent efforts by Metropolitan Andrey Sheptytsky and his brother, the Blessed Klymentiy Sheptytsky, the church was dismantled under the supervision and direction of Mykhailo Dragan in 1930, transported to Lviv, and reassembled as a church for the needs of the Studite monastery. It became the first exhibit of what would later become the museum.

It is difficult to say what fate would have befallen this masterpiece of wooden architecture—the small Boyko-style Church of St. Nicholas from the village of Kryvka, located in the Turka region, and now one of the jewels of the Museum of Folk Architecture and Rural Life in Lviv—if not for the fact that at the time the parish priest of the village was Fr. Markelii Kunovsky. According to some sources, the church, dedicated to St. Nicholas, was built in 1761, while other sources suggest 1763. For a long time, the church met the needs of the village’s residents, whose number never exceeded 400. By the 1920s, the population had nearly doubled, prompting the community to plan the dismantling of the old church to build a new one in its place ... The fate that awaited the old church was similar to that of many wooden churches: it could have been sold to a poorer village or simply dismantled and used for firewood. During discussions with the community regarding the church’s future, Fr. Markelii Kunovsky reached out to the noted art historian Mykhailo Dragan, who in turn sought the assistance of Metropolitan Andrey Sheptytsky. Dragan convinced the Metropolitan of the value of purchasing the church from the village and relocating it to Lviv. Under Dragan’s supervision, the church was dismantled and transported by carts from Kryvka to what is now Shevchenkivskyi Hai in Lviv, where it was reassembled in 1930, thereby laying the foundation for the open-air Museum of Folk Architecture and Rural Life.

In 1966, at the initiative of employees of the Museum of Ethnography and Arts and Crafts, preparations for a new open-air museum began. A Department of Folk Construction was established, and in 1971, it was reorganized into the Museum of Folk Architecture and Rural Life. In 1975, Petro Kharytonovych Pyrozhenko worked at the museum for a year. He organized expeditions in search of exhibits throughout the Pre-Carpathian and Podolia regions.

In 2013, the museum received a UNESCO grant of $300,000. As part of a two-year program, the funding was allocated for seminars and demand analysis, enhancement of tourism appeal, and the study of international museum practices. The program also included funding for advertising, and for purchasing specialized equipment for the architectural department and collections storage. Planned renovations included workshops, the administrative building, storage facilities, and a traditional house from the village of Shandrovets. Uniforms for the museum staff were also planned.

On December 1, 2016, the museum was officially named after the Blessed Klymentiy Sheptytsky. From that point forward, the skansen, long known to Lviv residents as "Shevchenkivskyi Hai," became formally titled the Klymentiy Sheptytsky Museum of Folk Architecture and Rural Life. Notably, the name "Shevchenkivskyi Hai" has never held official status.

In late July 2018, the museum administration announced a tender for the construction of an information and educational center in the southern part of the museum grounds, on Chernecha Hora Street—along the extension of the main alley of Znesinnia Park and adjacent to the city transport and pedestrian routes of Nizhynska and Striletska Streets. The proposed one-story building was to include an entrance hall, restrooms, and a café for 80 visitors. The basement level was to house classrooms, a conference hall for 110 people, as well as administrative and utility rooms. Construction was expected to be completed by the end of 2018. In August 2017, a parking lot with 53 spaces was already under construction near the future visitor center site. On September 29, 2024, an information and educational center with a shelter was opened in the park.

=== People involved in the creation of the museum and its activities ===
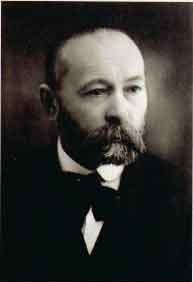
Hilarion Sventsitsky

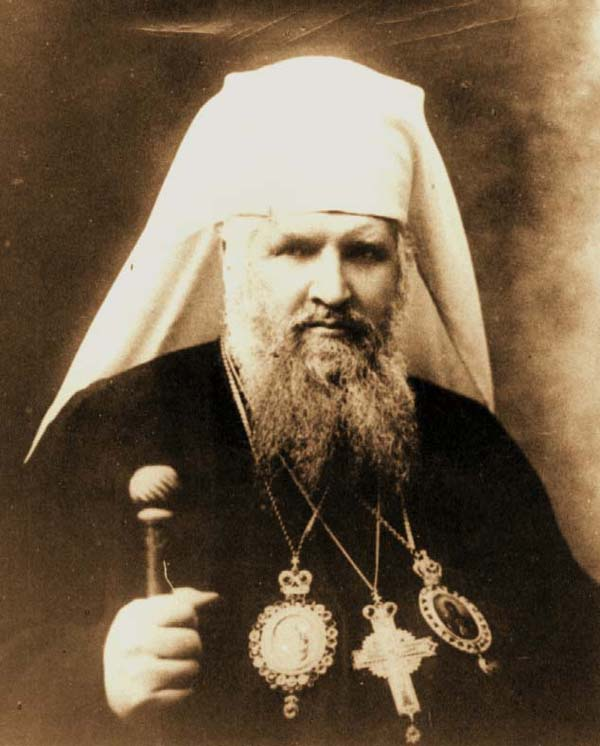
Andrey Sheptytsky

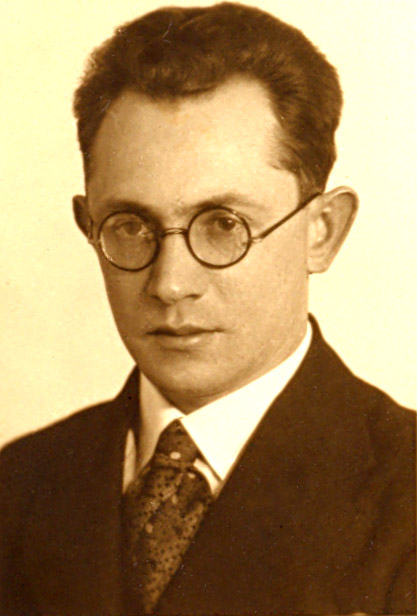
Mykhailo Dragan

== Museum Exhibition ==
The museum's collection includes 124 architectural monuments, organized into 54 homesteads. The museum houses four exhibition halls, two of which feature permanent exhibitions. In the permanent exhibitions and museum storage facilities, there are approximately 20,000 items of everyday life and applied folk art.

The 36-hectare museum territory is conventionally divided into six ethnographic zones. Each zone functions as a miniature village composed of 15–20 monuments of vernacular architecture. Within the residential and utility buildings are displays of household items, agricultural tools, means of transportation, and craft equipment. The six mini-villages are named Boykivshchyna, Lemkivshchyna, Hutsulshchyna, Bukovyna, Podillia, and Lvivshchyna, although the latter three are less frequently visited by tourists, as they are considered to be less informative.

Among the 120+ architectural monuments from the western regions of Ukraine, six are wooden churches. The oldest exhibit is a peasant house from 1749. Other notable buildings include a blacksmith's forge, a school, a sawmill, a fulling mill, a watermill, and a windmill. The Museum of Folk Architecture and Life in Lviv is visited by over 300 thousand people every year.

=== Boykivshchyna ===
Significant exhibits in the Boykivshchyna section include a rural homestead with a house built in 1812 and a stable from 1903, both relocated from the village of Lybohora in the Turka Raion, as well as a Boyko house from 1909 originating from the village of Tukholka in the Skole Raion. This section also contains two churches.

A masterpiece of folk architecture is the wooden Church of St. Nicholas from 1763, relocated from the village of Kryvka in the Turka Raion — a monument of both national and European significance. The second church is from the village of Tysovets in the Skole Raion, dating to 1863.

=== Lemkivshchyna ===
The main exhibit in the Lemkivshchyna section is a peasant homestead from the Transcarpathian village of Zabrid. It is a traditional “long house” accompanied by auxiliary agricultural buildings, including a granary with a cellar, a chicken coop, a sekes, and a well. The house itself consists of a living room, an entrance hall, a pantry, a barn, and a threshing barn.

In 1992, this section was expanded through the efforts of patrons with a replica of the Church of Saints Volodymyr and Olha (1831), originally from the village of Kotań.

=== Hutsulshchyna ===
The central exhibit in the Hutsulshchyna section is a traditional Hutsul hrazhda — a fortified farmstead — from the village of Kryvorivnia in the Ivano-Frankivsk region.

=== Bukovina ===
The Bukovina section features several notable exhibits, including an early 20th-century homestead from the village of Berezhonka and the Church of the Holy Trinity (1774), which was relocated to the museum in the 1960s from the Klokuchka area.

=== Lvivshchyna ===
A Roman Catholic chapel (also referred to as a "kostelyk") built in 1936–1937 in the village of Yazlivchyk, Brody Raion, is a key exhibit of the Lvivshchyna sector. In the autumn of 2012, the chapel was dismantled by a group of Polish students led by Professor Romana Cielątkowska, head of the Department of Ecological Design at Gdańsk University of Technology, and transported to Lviv. In the summer of 2013, Polish restorers reassembled the chapel at the Museum of Folk Architecture and Rural Life named after Klymentiy Sheptytsky. Today, this Roman Catholic chapel is one of the most striking examples of the now-rare group of wooden Catholic churches in Lviv Region from the first half of the 20th century. It is a unique instance of Art Nouveau style applied to wooden sacred architecture and has no analogues in Ukraine.

== Gallery ==
=== Lvivshchyna Sector ===
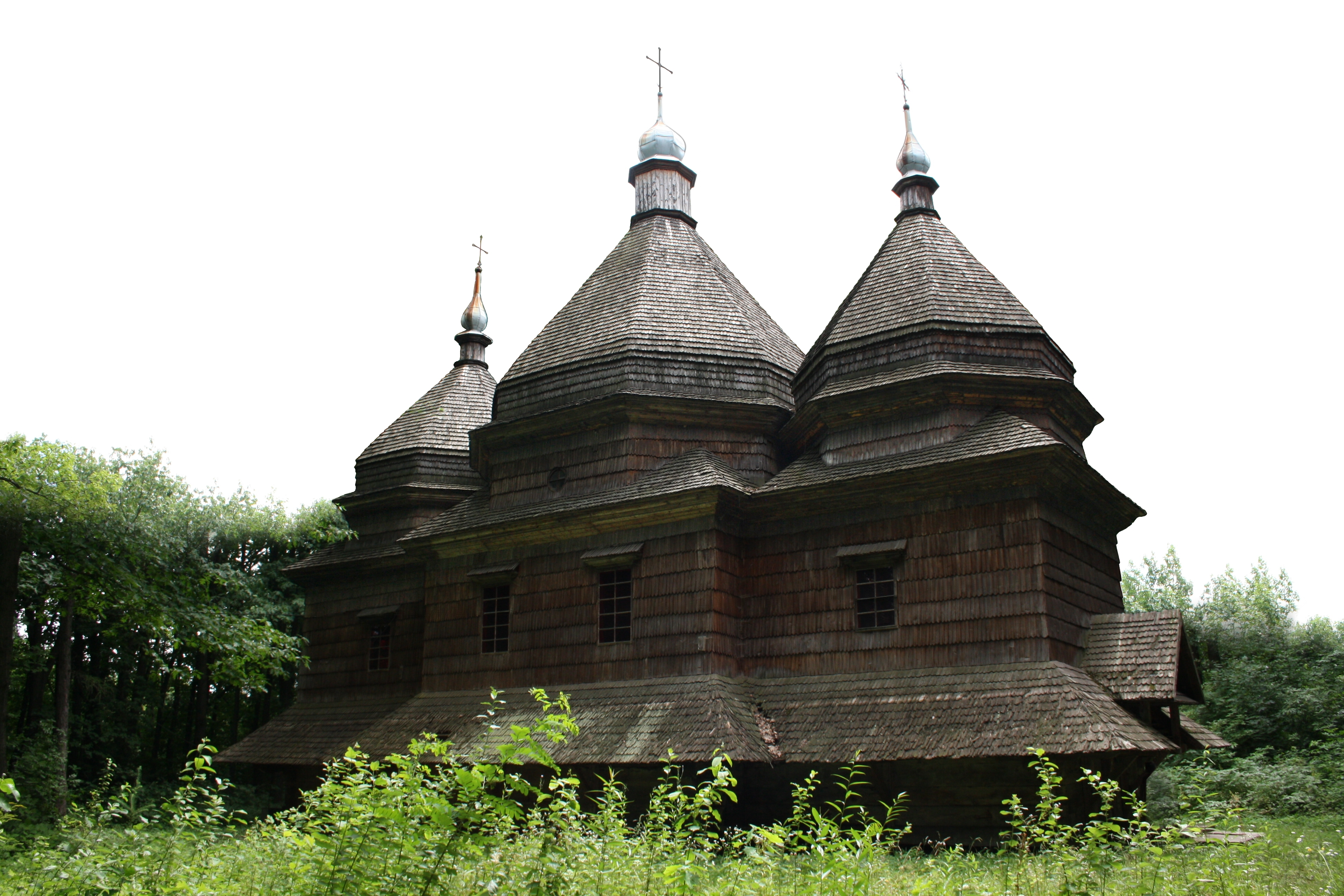
Church of St. Paraskeva (1822, Stoyaniv village)

=== Bukovyna Sector ===
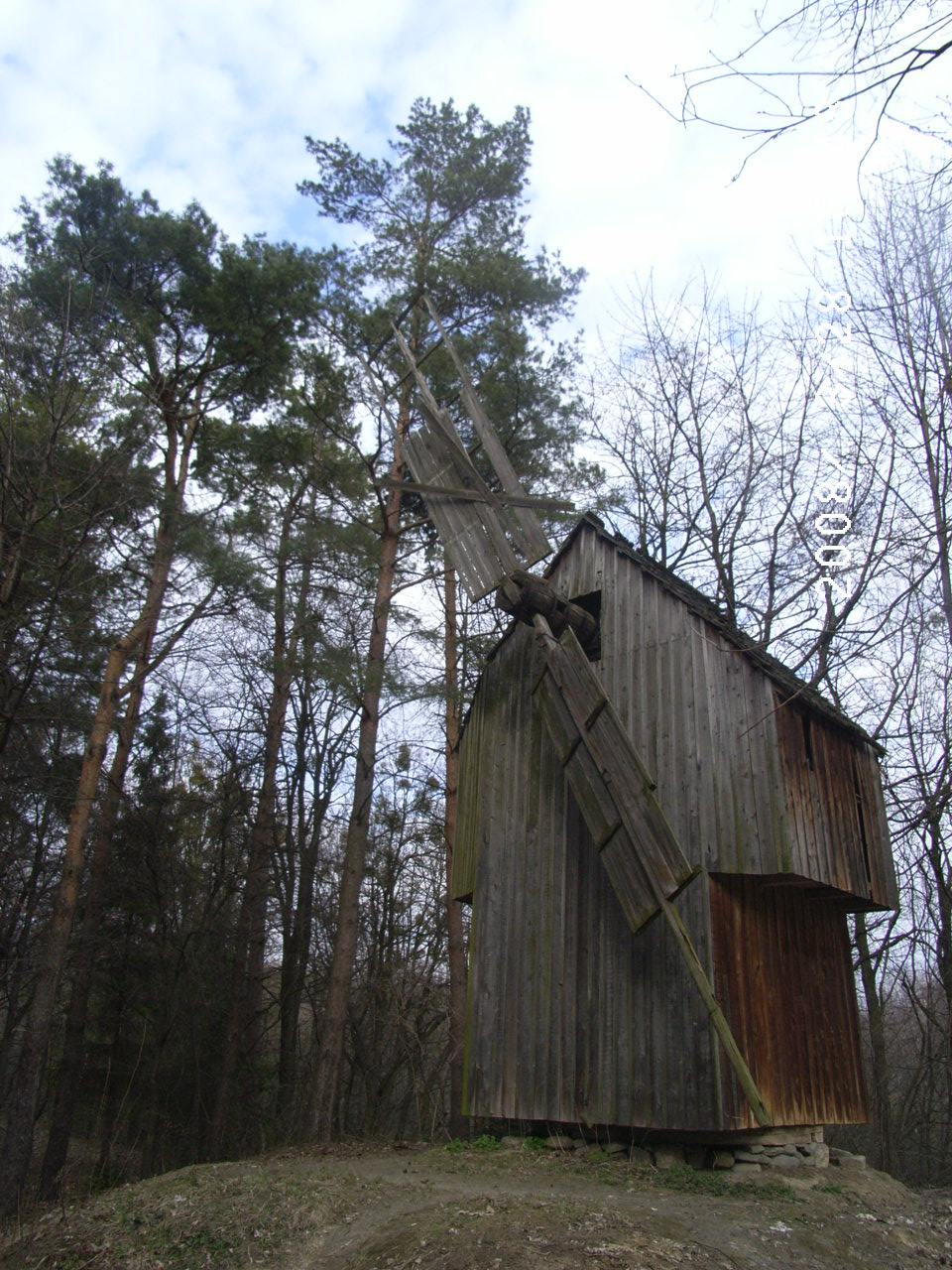
Windmill (early 20th century, Shyrivtsi village)

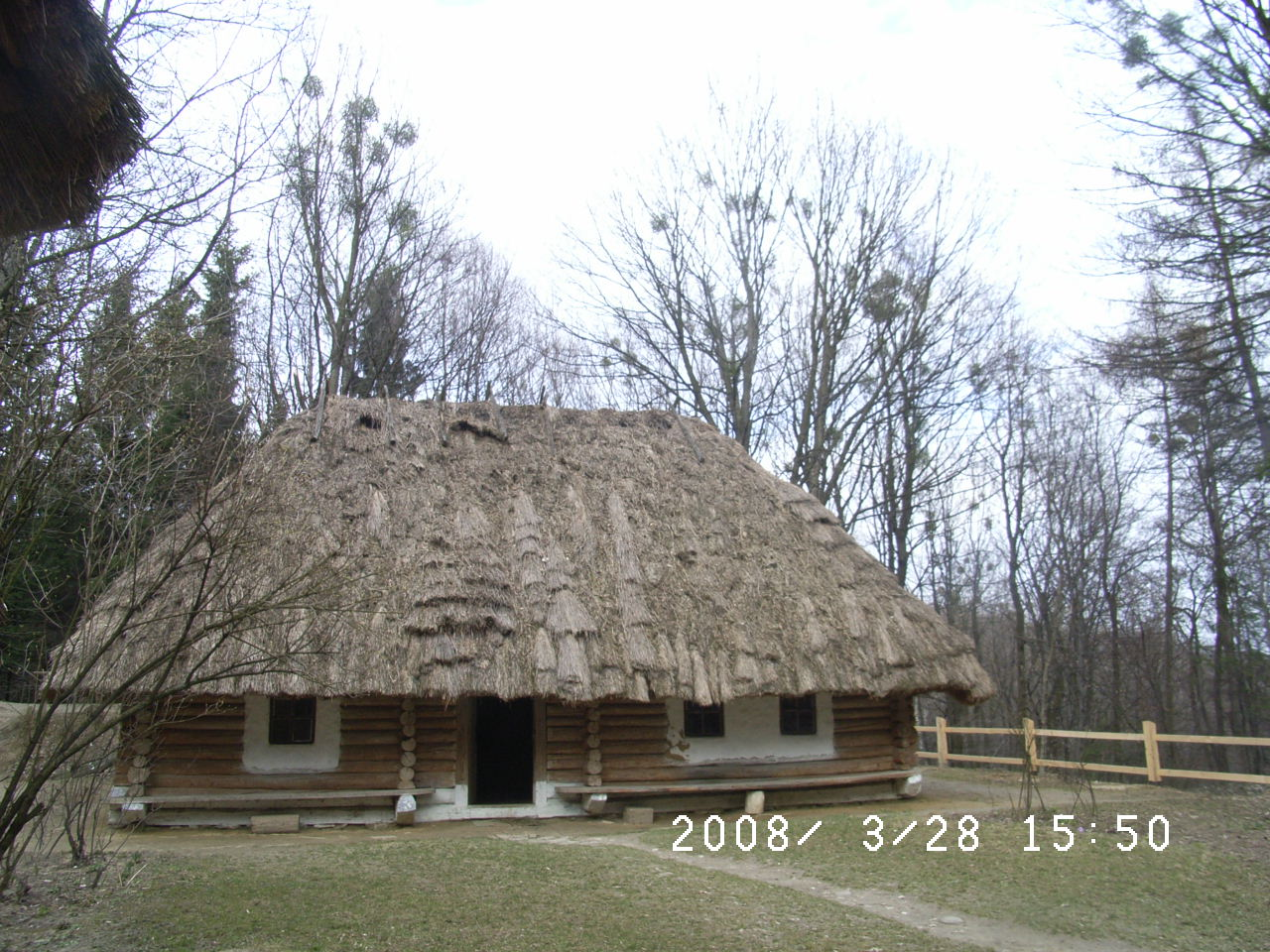
Homestead (early 20th century, Berezhonka village)

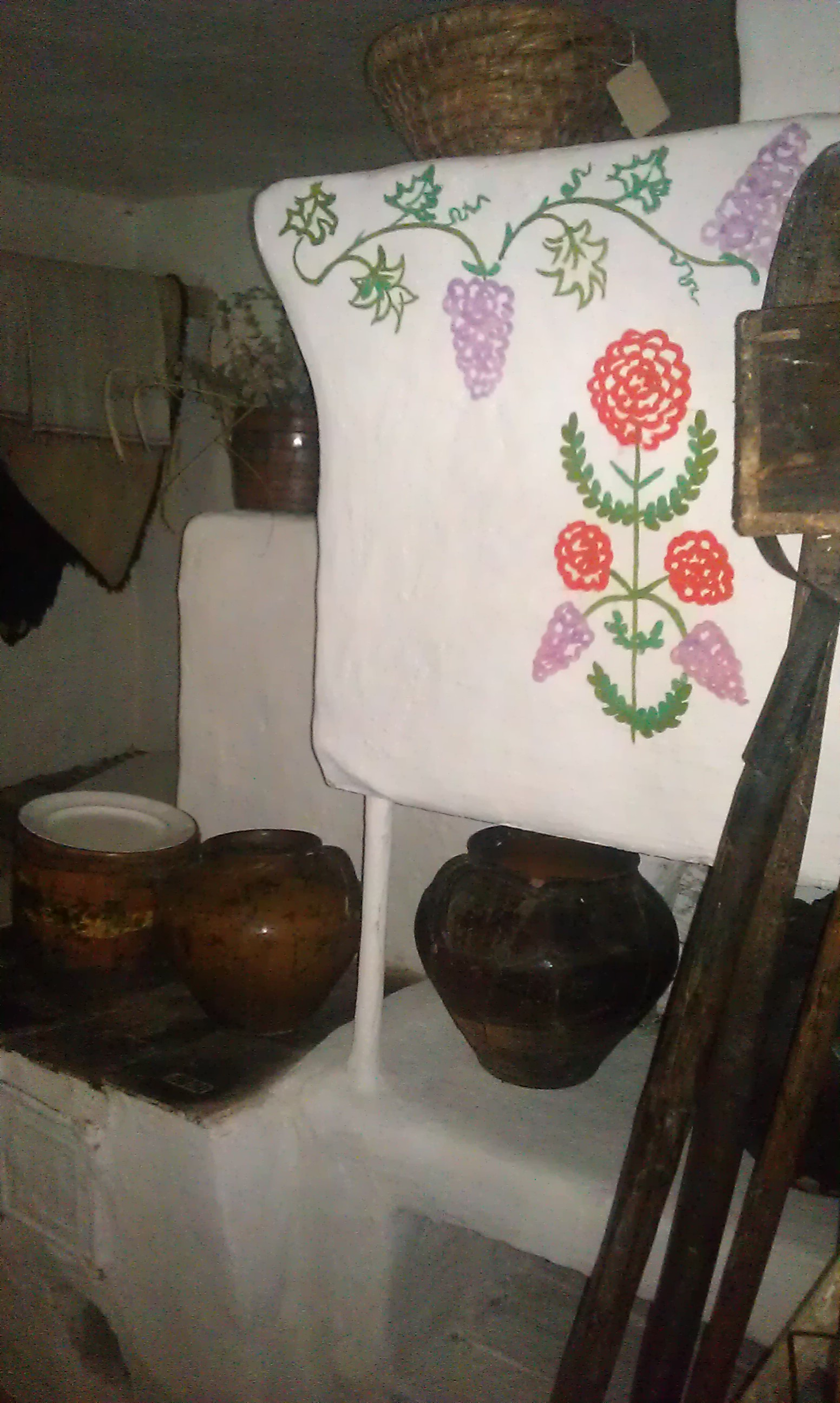
Interior of a house (Berezhonka village)

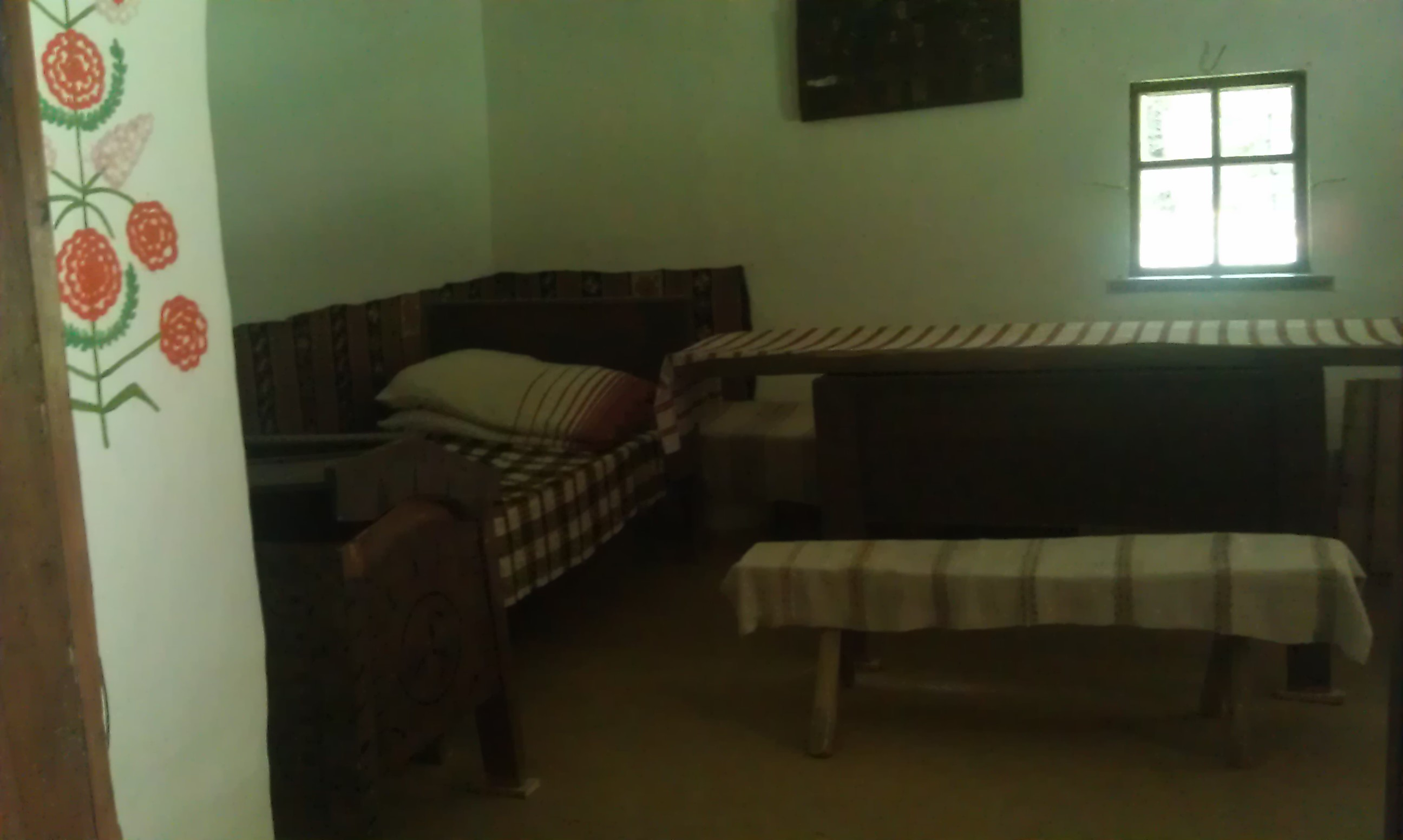
Interior of a house (Berezhonka village)

=== Boykivshchyna Sector ===
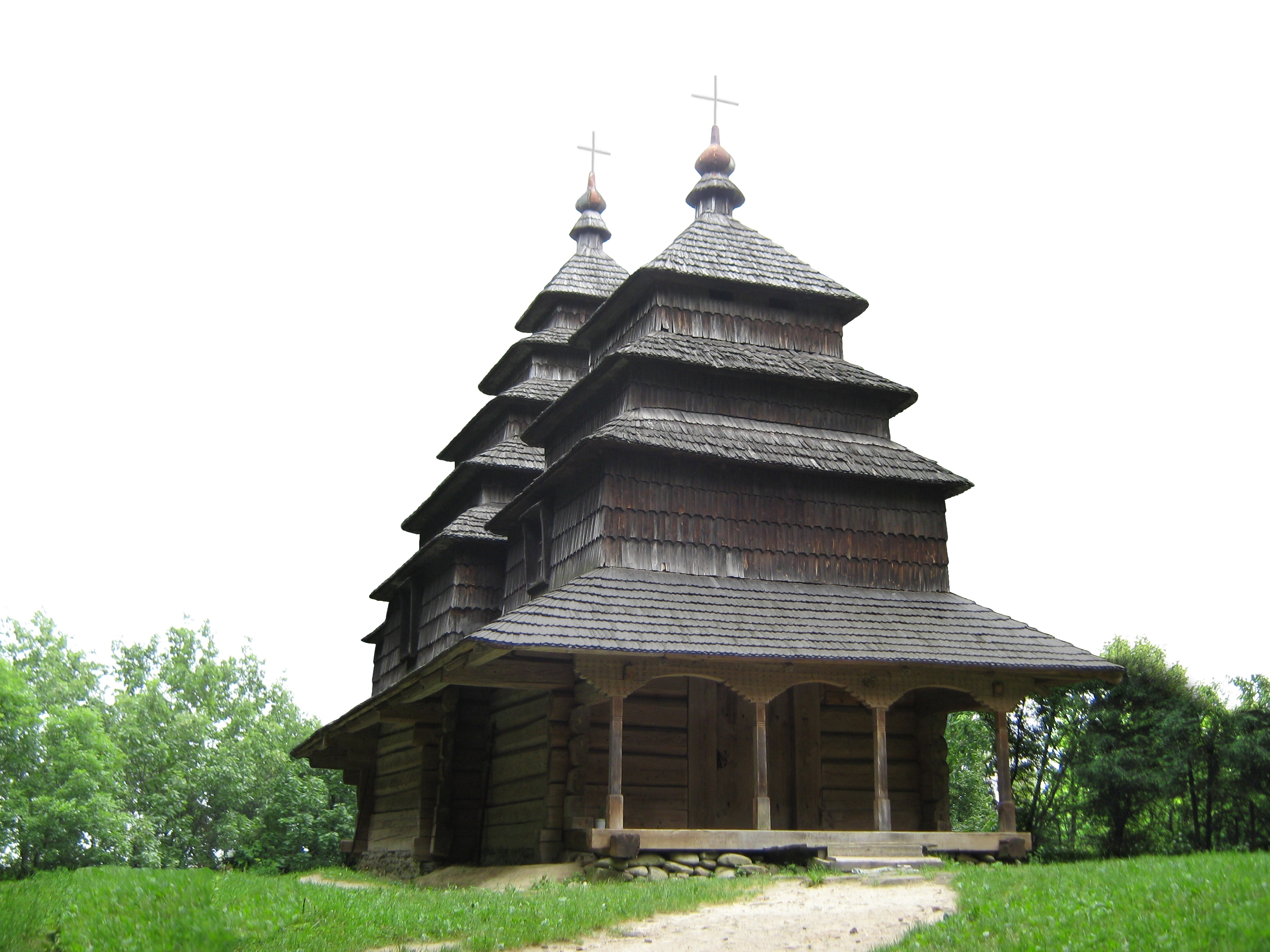
Church of St. Michael (1863, Tysovets village)

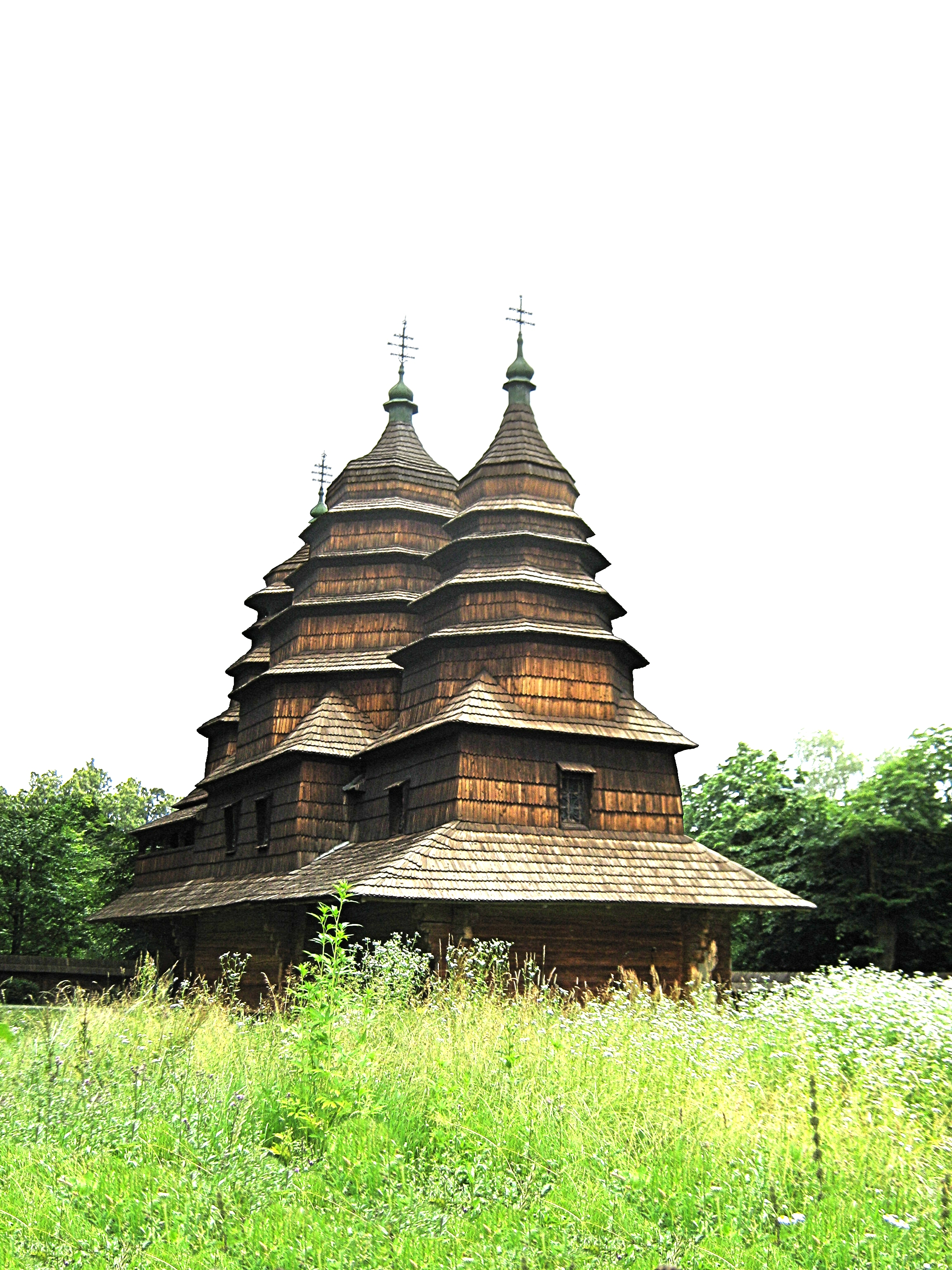
Church of Holy Wisdom (St. Nicholas Church) (1763, Kryvka village)

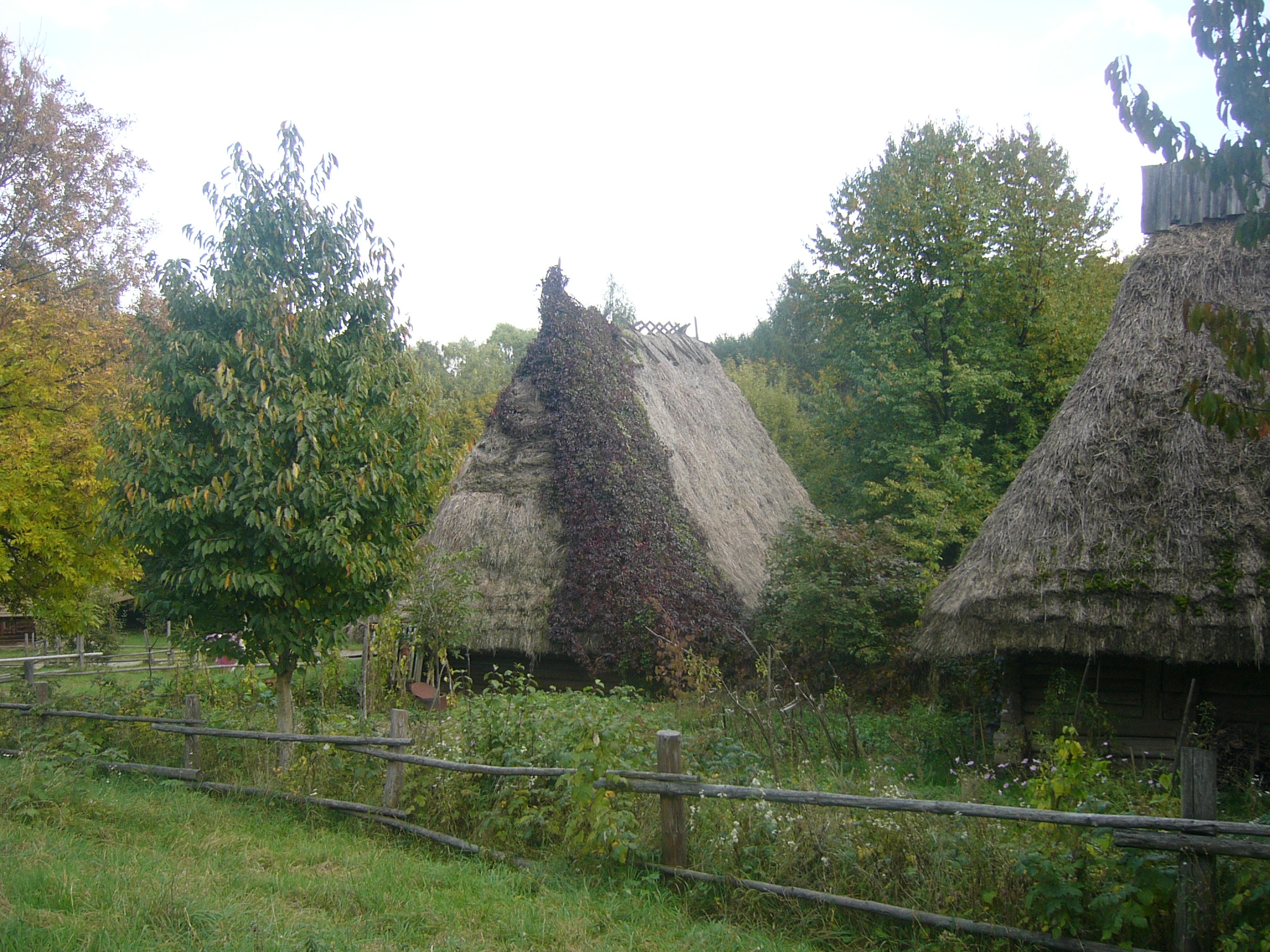
View of a homestead (mid-19th century, Pylypets village)

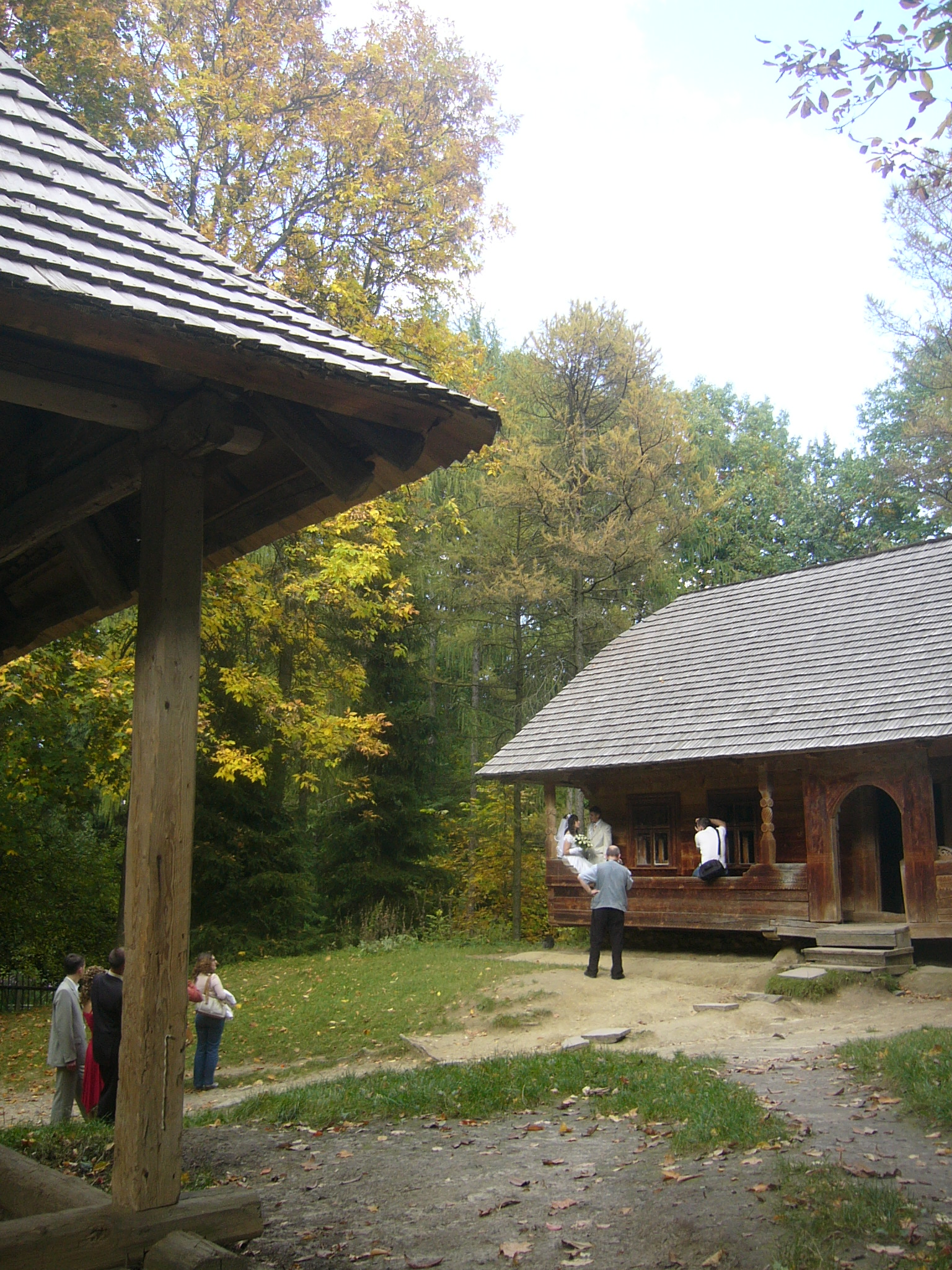
House (1912, Lybokhora village)

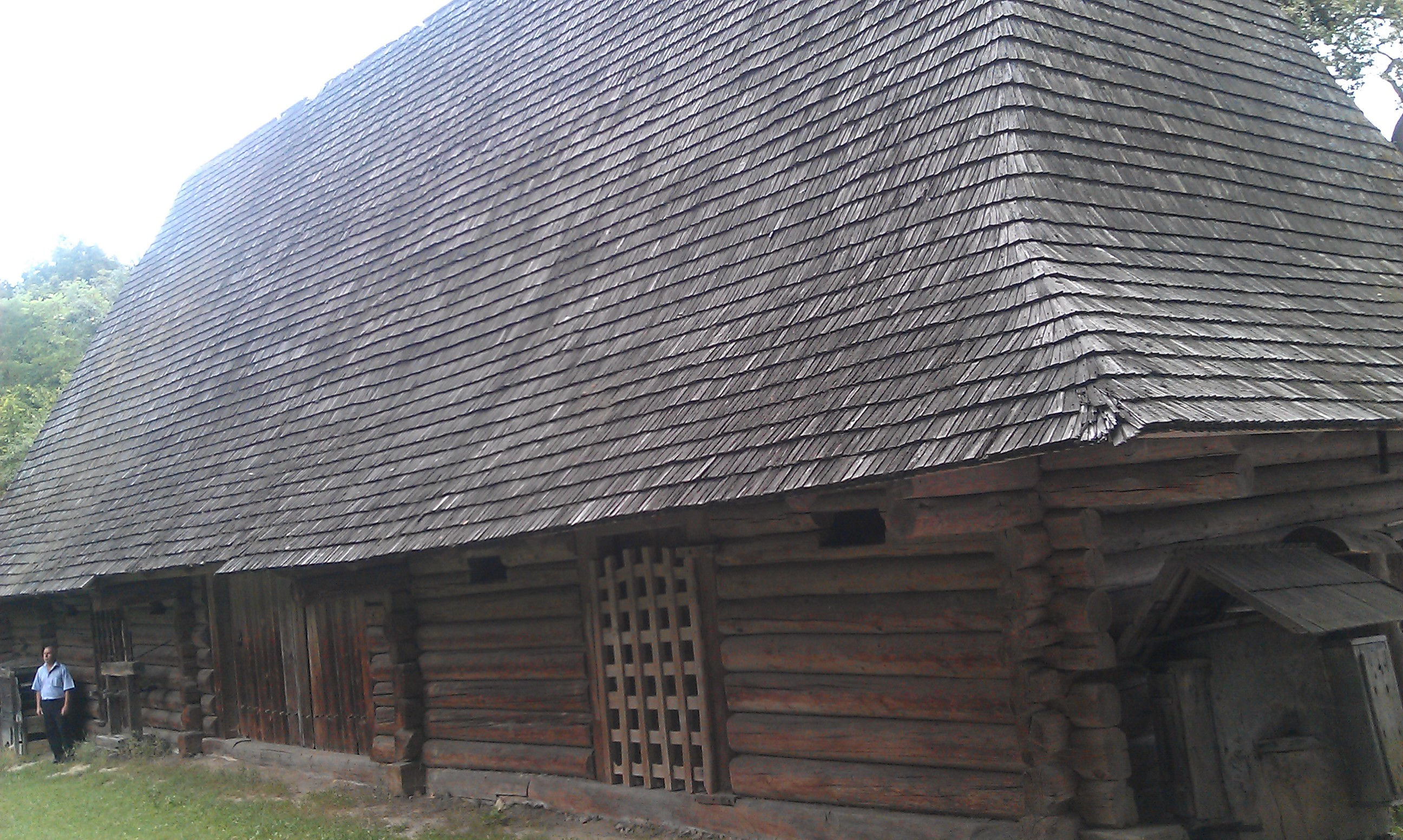
Stable-barn (Lybokhora village)

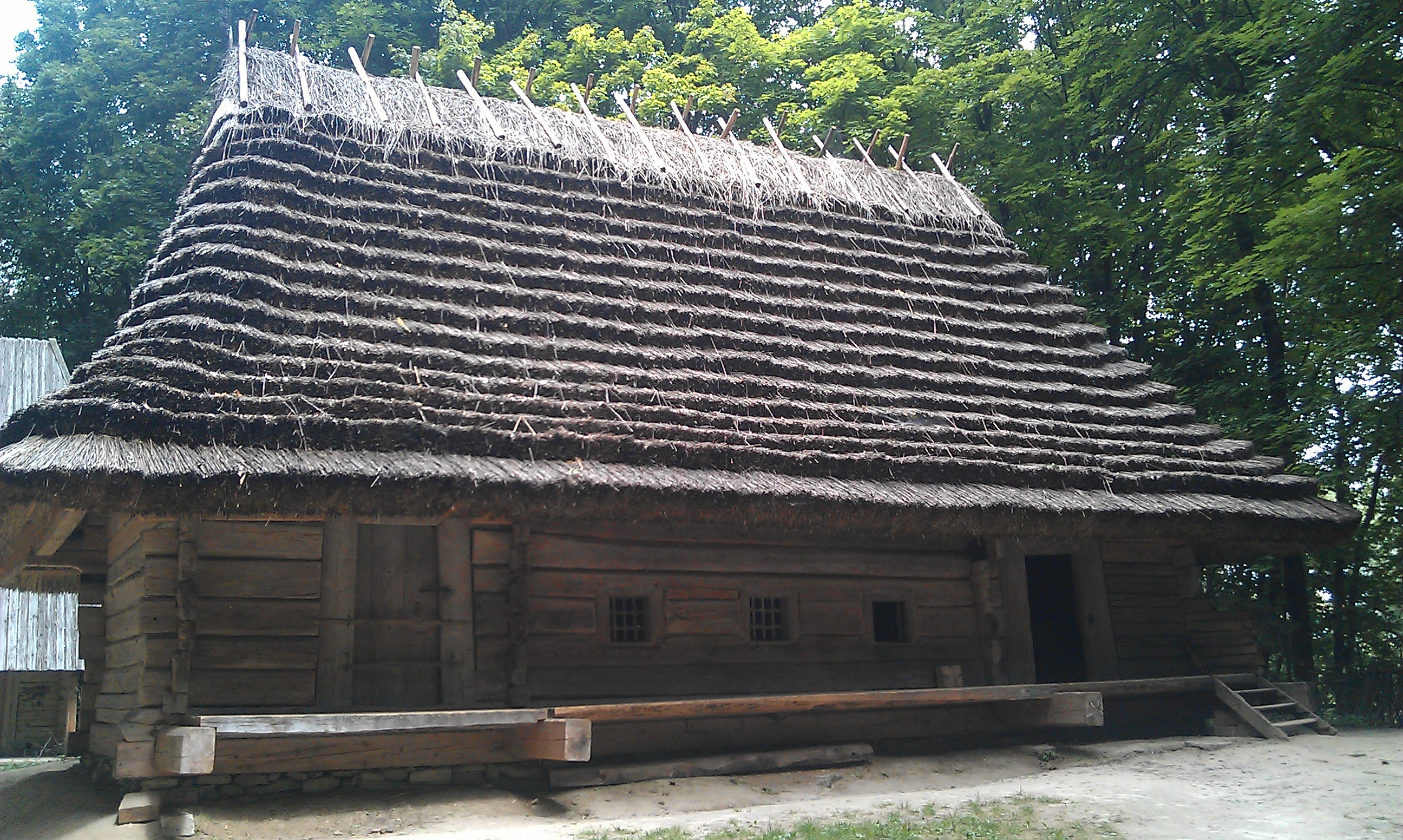
House (Lybokhora village)

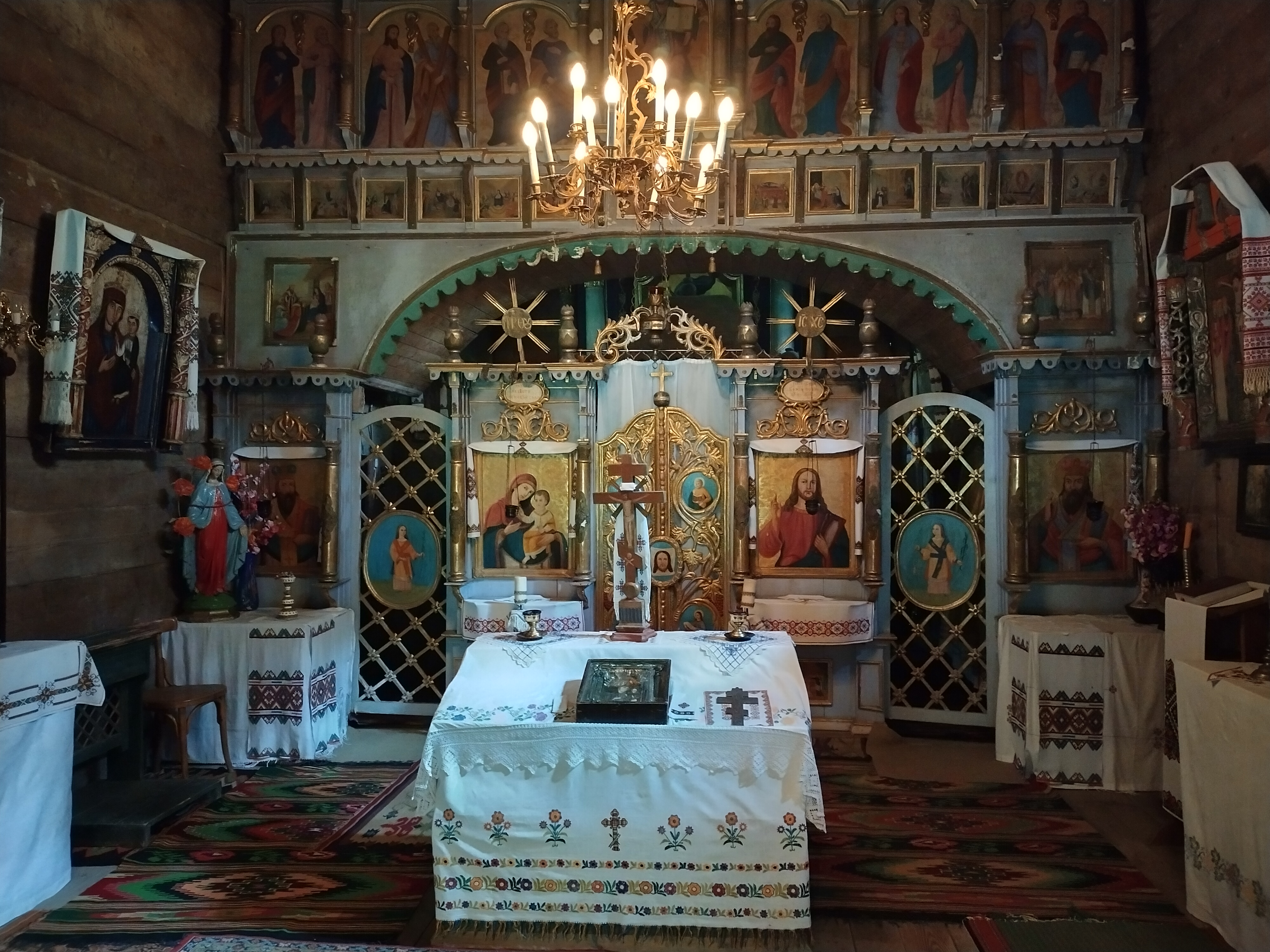
Main altar of the Church of St. Michael

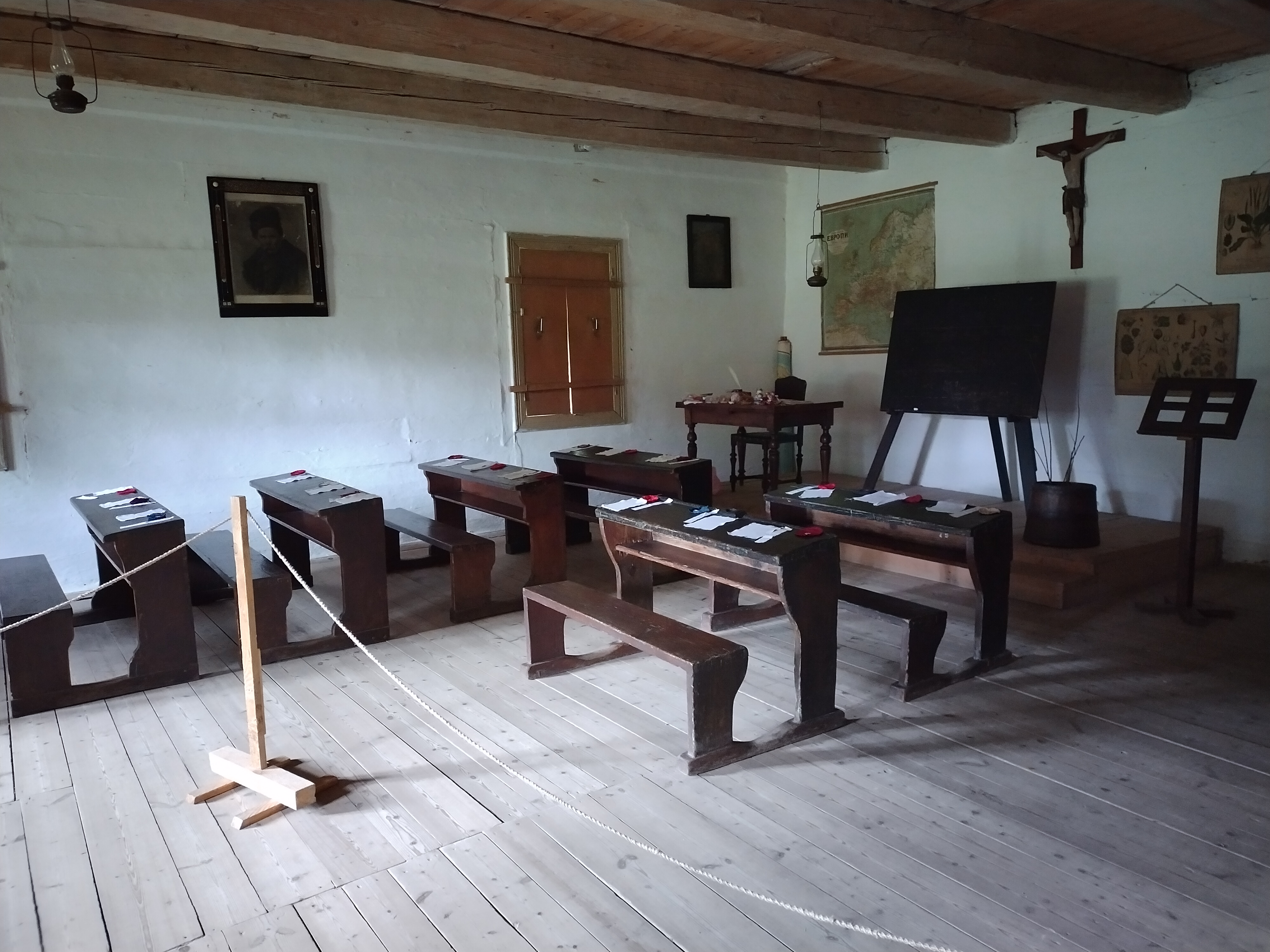
School interior (1880, Busovysko village)

=== Lemkivshchyna Sector ===
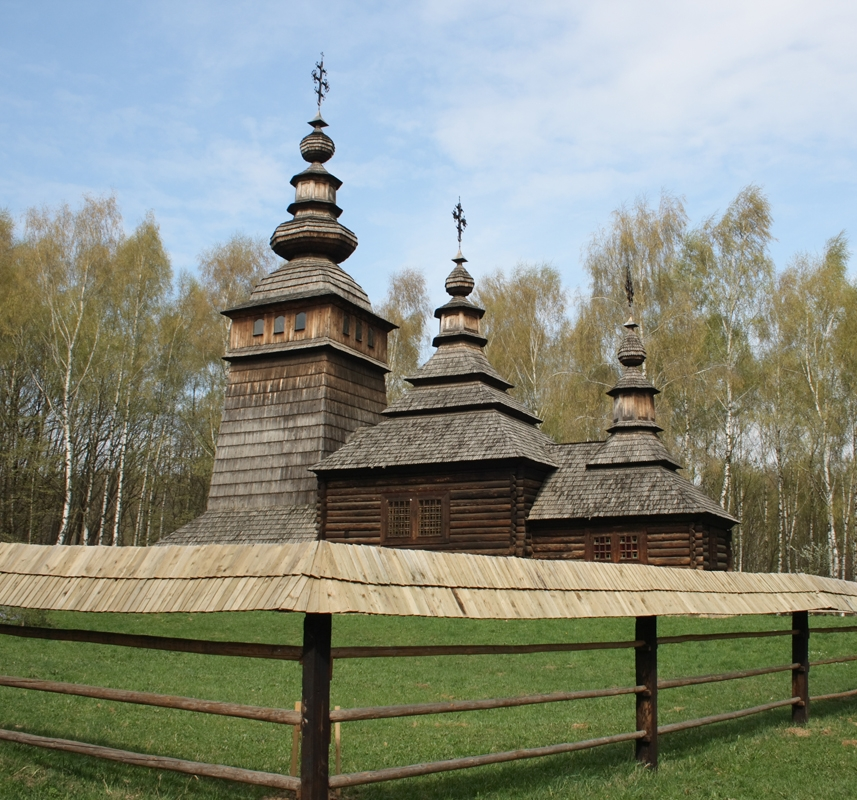
Church of Saints Olha and Volodymyr (replica, Kotan village)

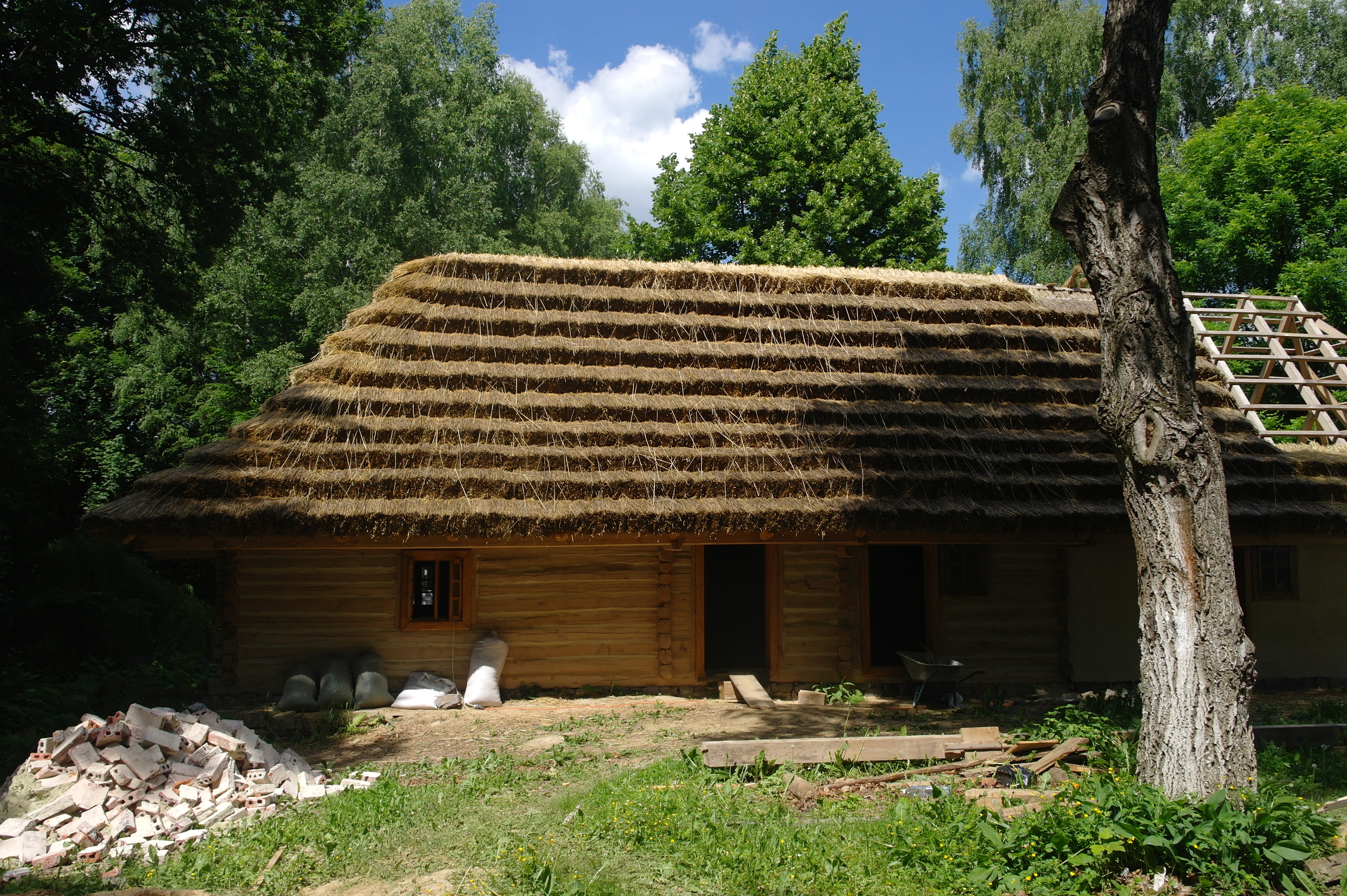
House (Zarichovo village)

=== Other Exhibits and Artworks ===
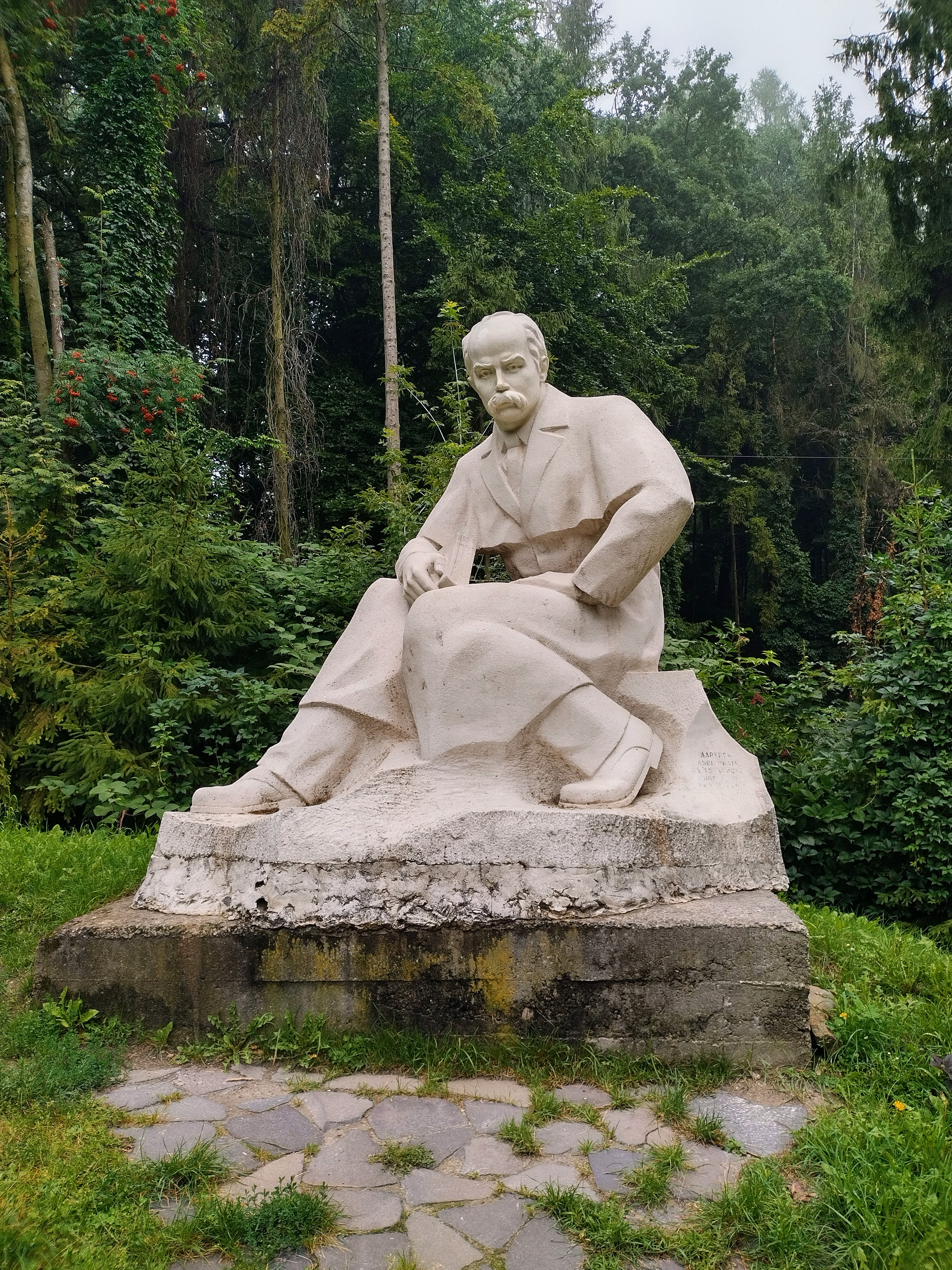
Monument to Taras Shevchenko near the museum entrance

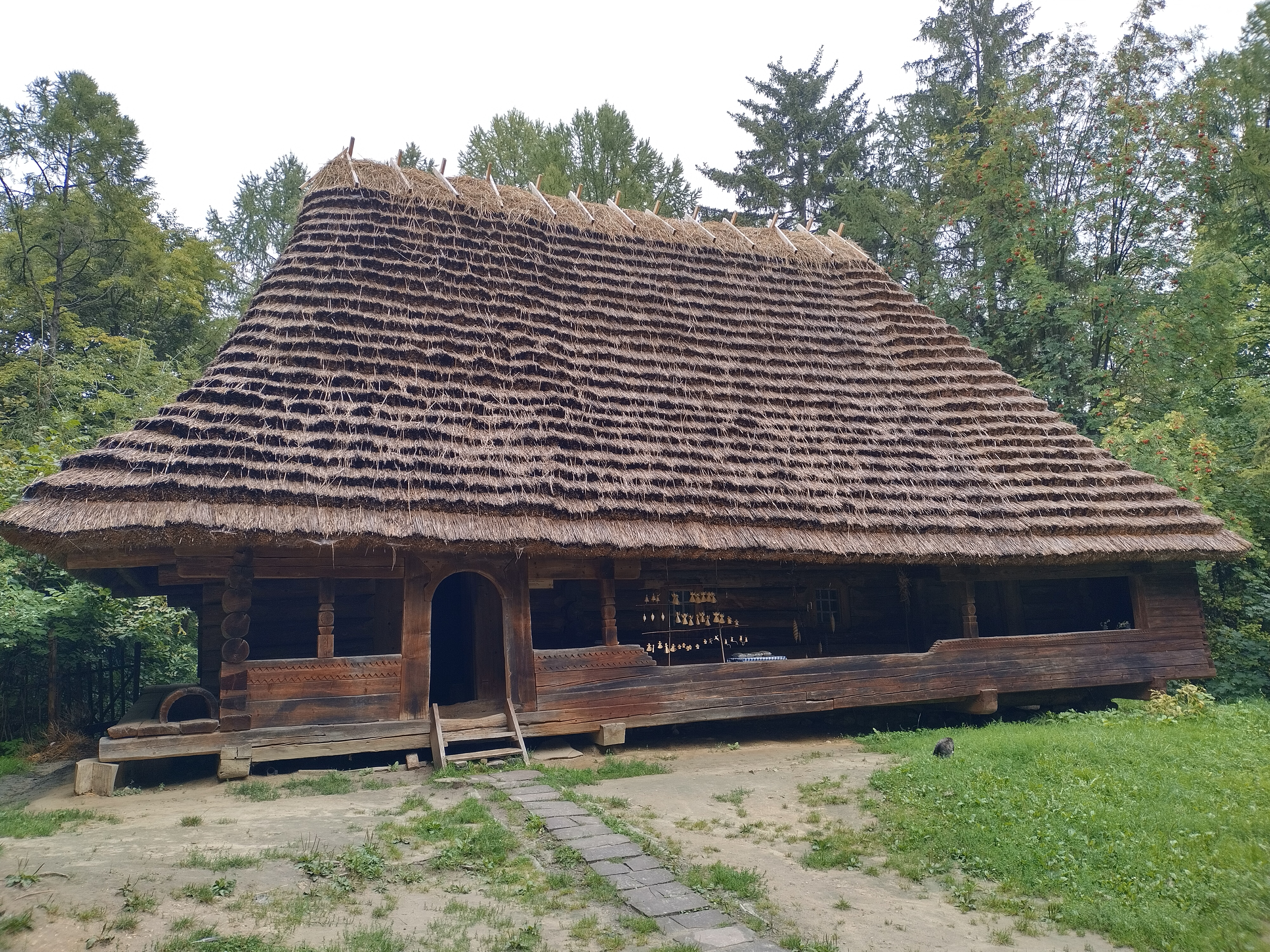
House (1860, Oryavchyk village)

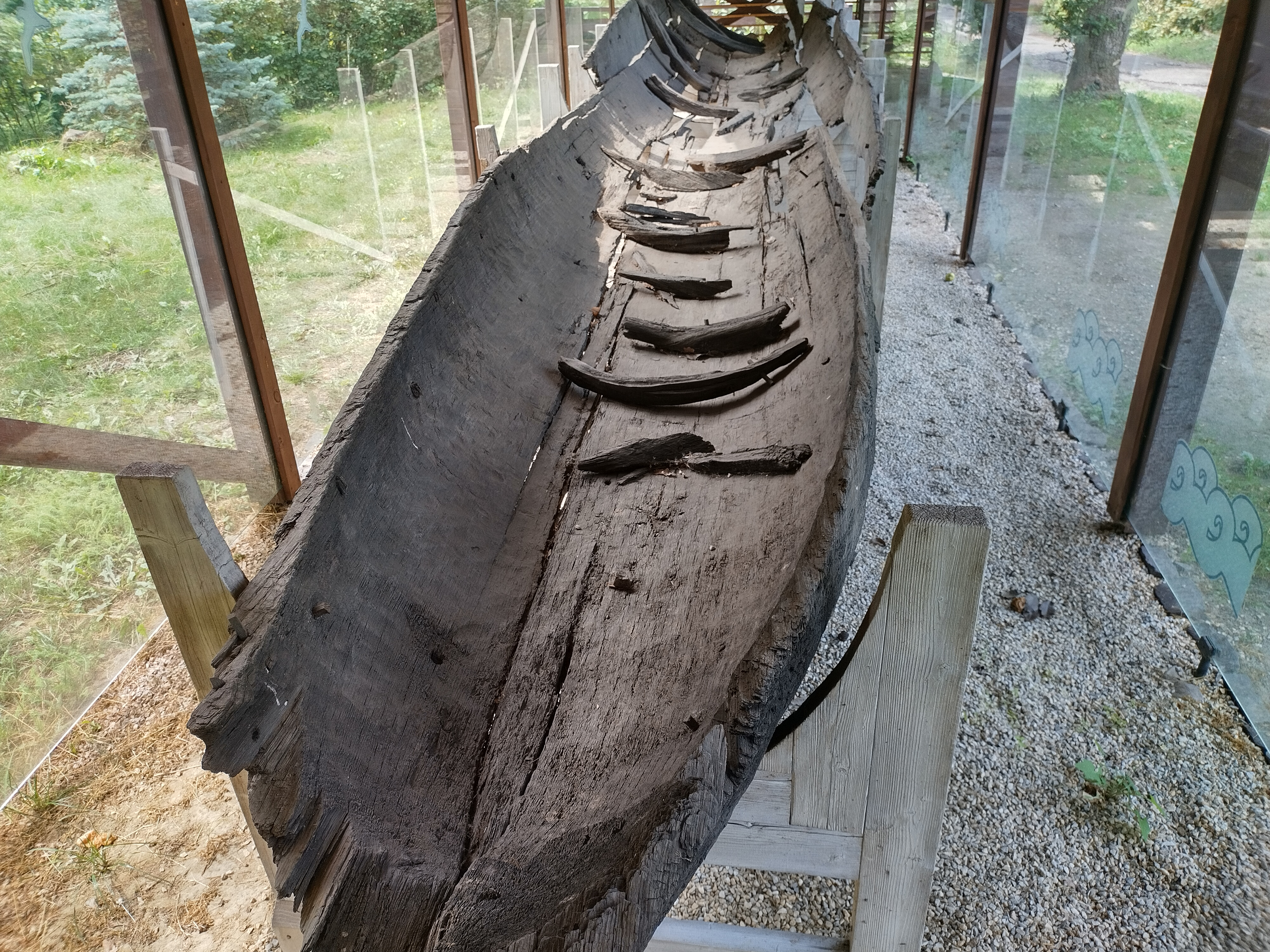
Cossack boat “Dub” (Horyn River, Orzhiv village)

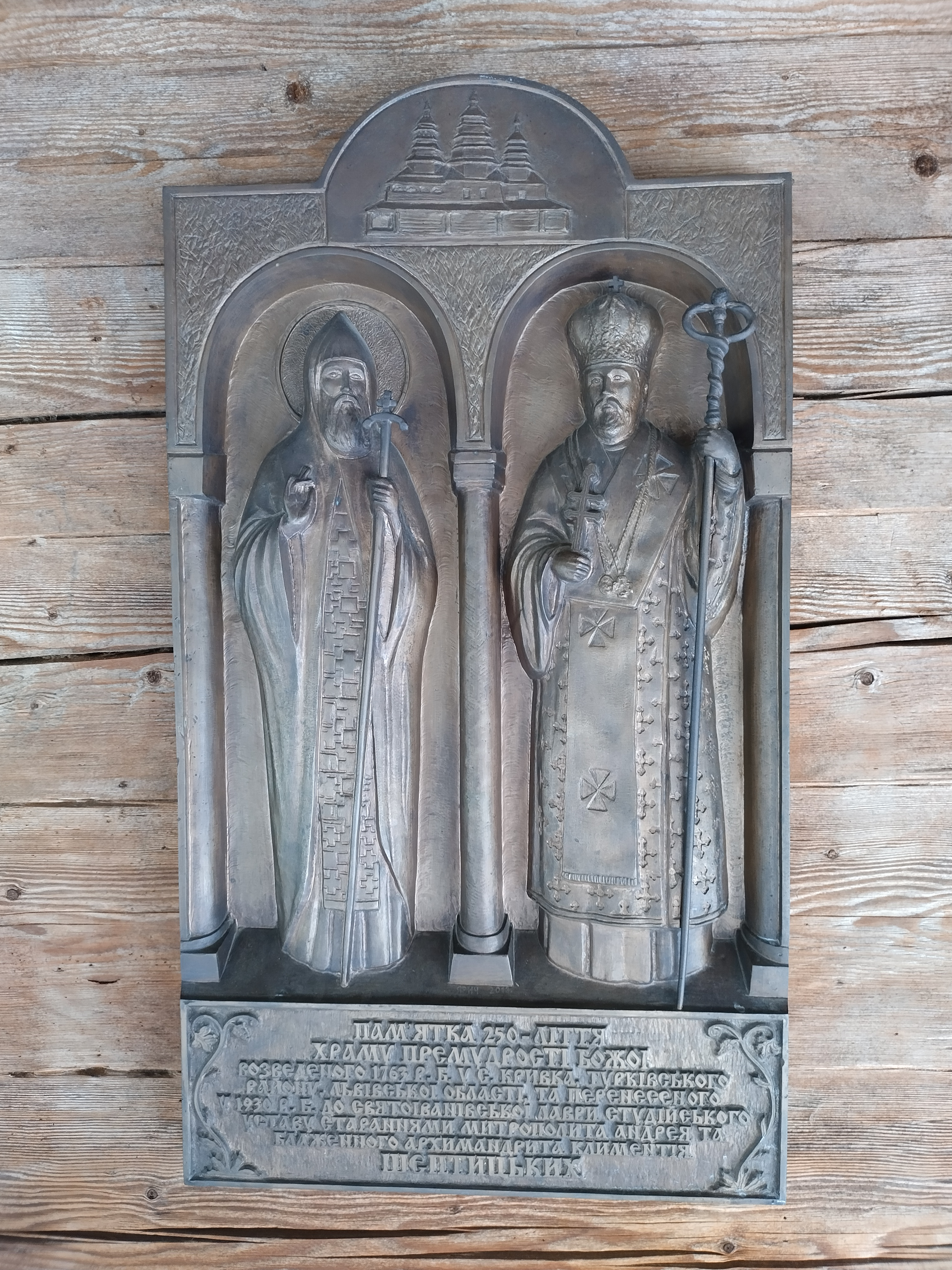
Memorial plaque commemorating the 250th anniversary of the Church of Holy Wisdom

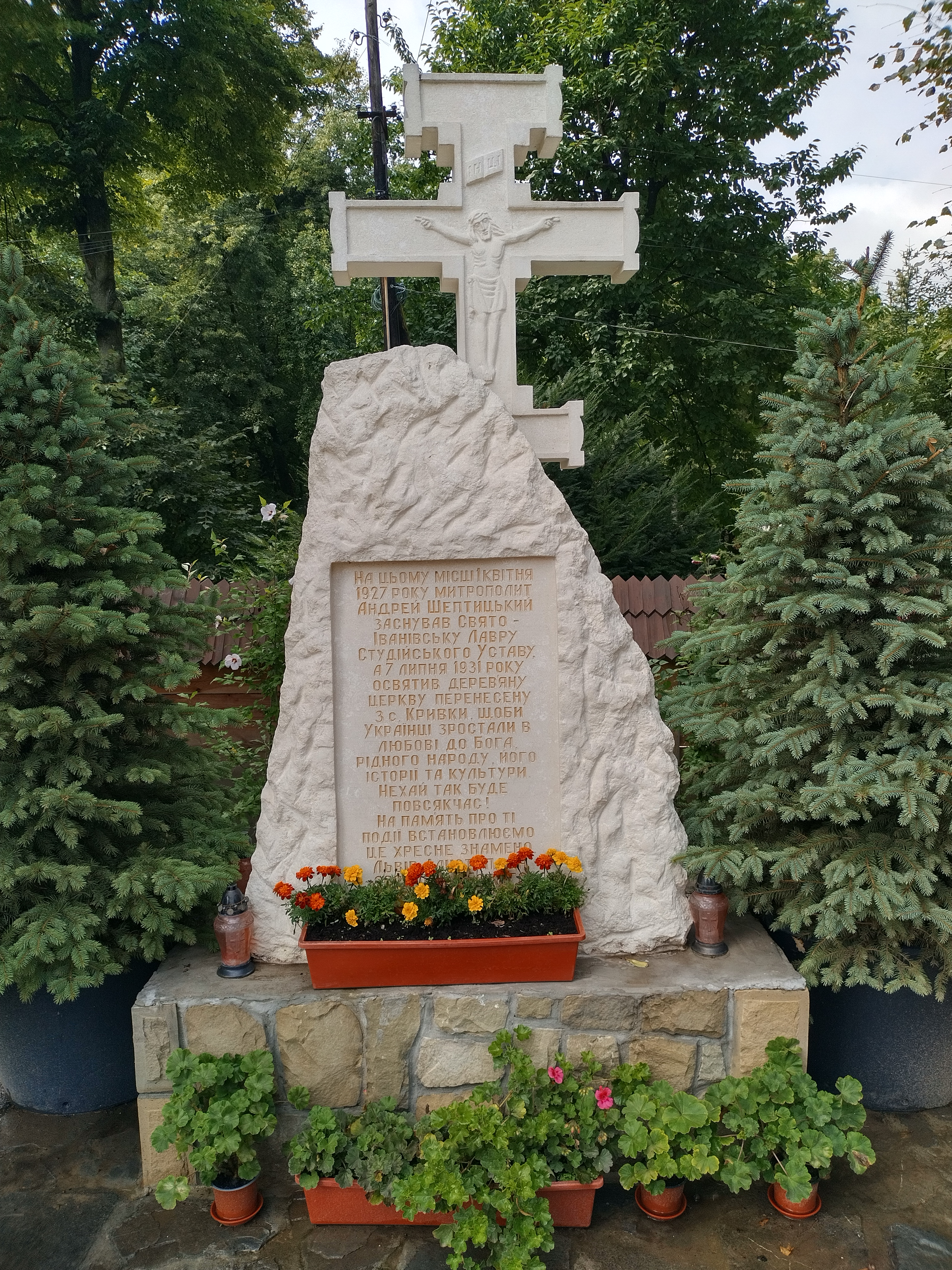
Monument to the founding of St. John Lavra by A. Sheptytsky

== Regular Events ==
- Star of Bethlehem Parade – January 8
- Easter "Haiivky" – April
- “Singing Field” Festival – May 4
- Mother's Day – May 13
- Medieval Culture Festival “Ancient Lviv” – May
- “Fairy Tale in the Grove” Festival – May 31 to June 2
- Green Holidays Celebration – June
- “Bread Festival” – August 17
- “Etnovyr” International Folklore Festival – August
- “Honey Festival” – September
- “Crafts Fair” – September

== Past Exhibitions ==
- Exhibition of Estonian Folk Art (1977)
- “Folk Art of the Novgorod Region” (1978)
- Photo exhibition from the Murmansk Regional Museum of Local Lore, dedicated to the life and everyday culture of the Saami people (1979)
- “50 Stories of the Lviv Skansen” exhibition, marking the museum’s 50th anniversary (2021)

== See also ==
- Kryvka Church

== Sources ==
- Мацкевий Л. Музей народної архітектури і побуту у Львові // Енциклопедія історії України: у 10 т. / editorial board.: В. А. Смолій (head) etc. ; Інститут історії України НАН України. — Kyiv : Наукова думка, 2010. — Т. 7 : Мл — О. — С. 111. — ISBN 978-966-00-1061-1.
- Данилюк А., Красовський І., Присяжний К. та ін. Музей народної архітектури та побуту у Львові. — Lviv: Kameniar, 1980. — 183 с.

== Link ==
- Official website
- Museum of Folk Architecture and Life "Shevchenkivskyi Hai" Virtual 3D Tour
- Photos of Shevchenkivskyi Hai
- Ukraine Tourist 2009. Museum of Folk Architecture and Life in Lviv — Acting Director — Ivan Petrovich Kosachevych
- Interview with the chief architect of the Museum of Folk Architecture and Life "Shevchenkivskyi Hai" - Igor Tsymbrovsky
