= Znesinnia Regional Landscape Park =

Regional landscape park in Lviv Oblast, Ukraine

Znesinnya Regional Landscape Park
- IUCN category V (protected landscape/seascape)
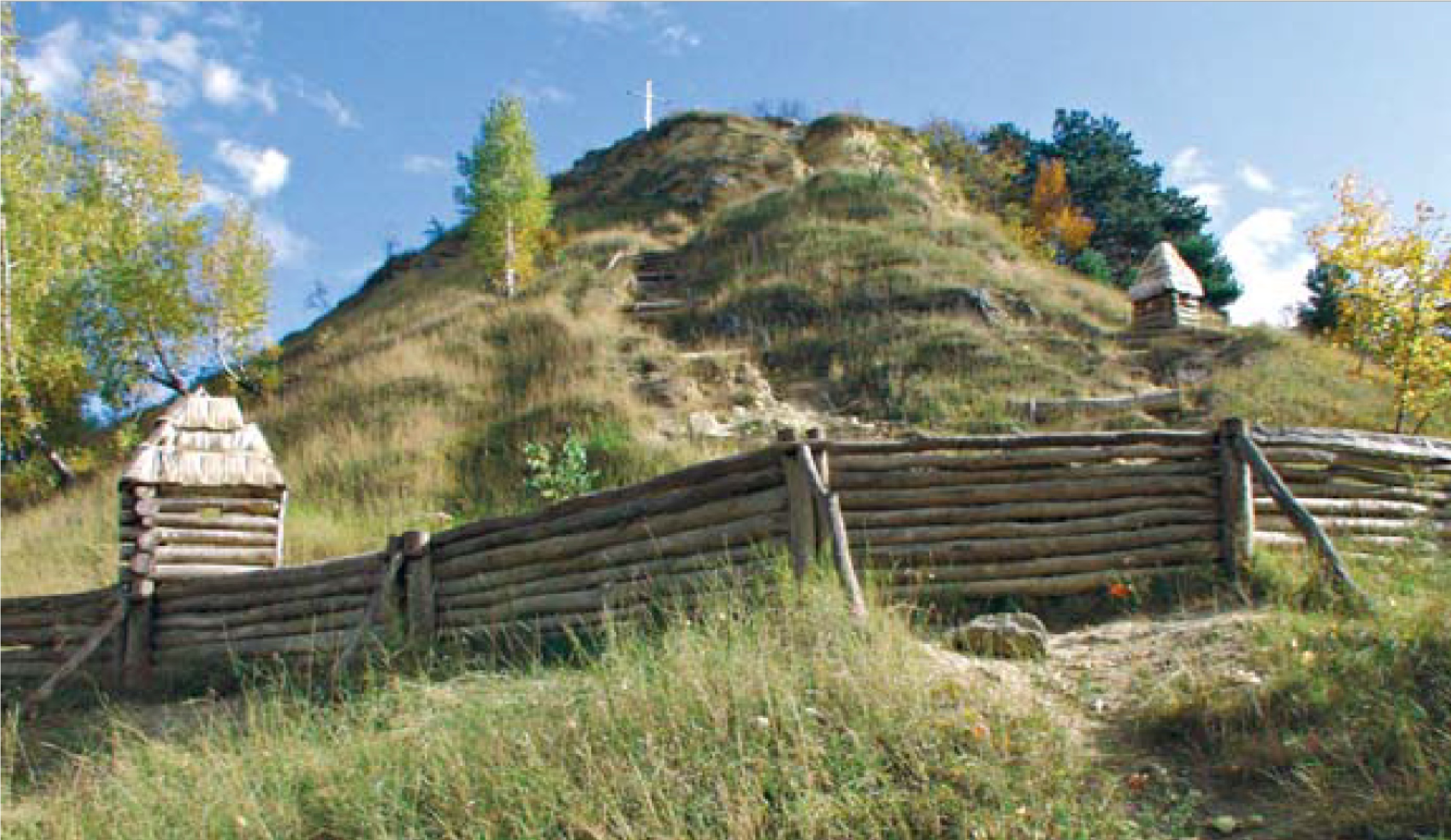

- Location within Lviv Oblast Location within Ukraine
- Location: Lviv, Ukraine
- Coordinates: 49.84653°N 24.06139°E
- Area: 312.1 ha (771 acres)
- Established: 1993
- Governing body: Regional Landscape Park Znesinnya Director: Ruslan Grezanik 79024, Ukraine, Lemberg, vul. Novosnesenska 32

The Znesinnya Regional Landscape Park (Ukrainian: Регіональний ландшафтний парк "Знесіння") is the largest park in Lviv, Ukraine. It is located in the north-east part of the city and reachable within a 20-minute walk from the Ratusha (City Hall) and the Rynok Square (Market Square). Together with the Vysokyi Zamok (High Castle) the hills of Park Znesinnya from Lviv's distinctive city skyline, known from drawings going back to the 16th century.

The park is located on green hilly parts of the historical village Znesinnya which was named after the Christian holiday of Ascension. Therefore, it is one of the first areas settled by men inside the present boundaries of Lviv. Being commenced due to a public initiative in 1993, Park Znesinnya is one of the first Regional Landscape Parks in Ukraine founded within the territory of a large city. The NGO "Regional Foundation Znesinnya" started to claim for the protection of the area informally in 1990, getting registered in 1991 as a non-governmental, non-profit organization. The park is managed by the park administration as a subunit of the city department of urban development and supported by „Regional Foundation Znesinnya”. Following Ukrainian legislation on natural environment protected areas the park provides not only typical recreational park functions with tourism, but also environmental protection and environmental education. Park Znesinnya covers a total area of 312 hectares and includes rare specimens of plants, as well as sandstones, limestones containing fossils, hills covered by forests and valleys with ponds and streams. Regional Landscape Park Znesinnya is located on the main European watershed that separates the Baltic and the Black Sea. Therefore, the green hills of Znesinnya are a part of Roztochia, a mountain range connecting Poland and Ukraine. Parts of Roztochia are under protection, in Poland as a National Park and in Ukraine as a Biosphere Reserve.

Including the Open-Air Museum of Folk Architecture in Shevchenkivskyi Hai (Shevchenko Grove) it contains some of the most famous tourist attractions of Lviv. Located close to the old town and the area under UNESCO protection, Znesinnya has several entrances from various streets, free for one's choice to walk.

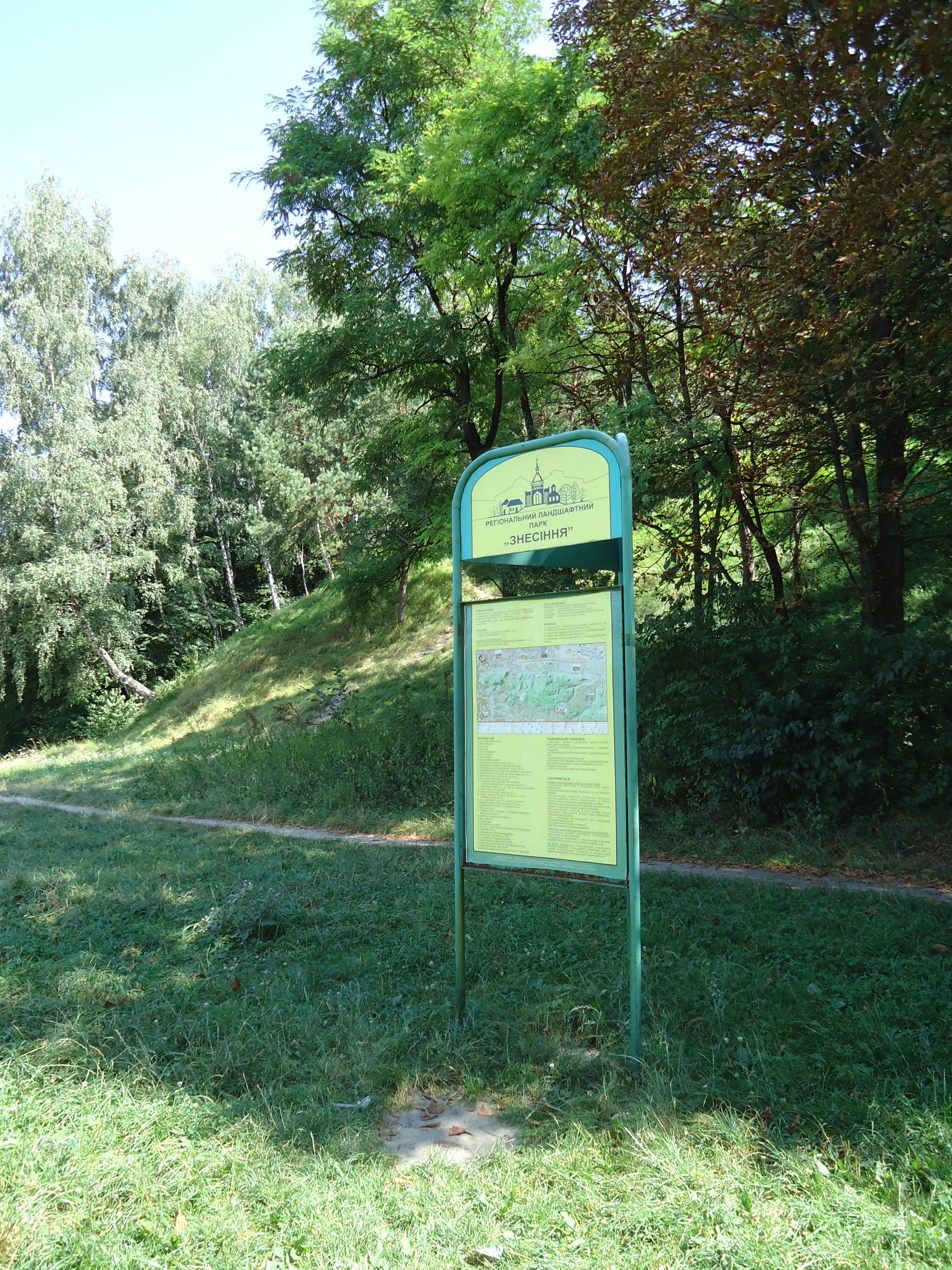
Info maps guide the way

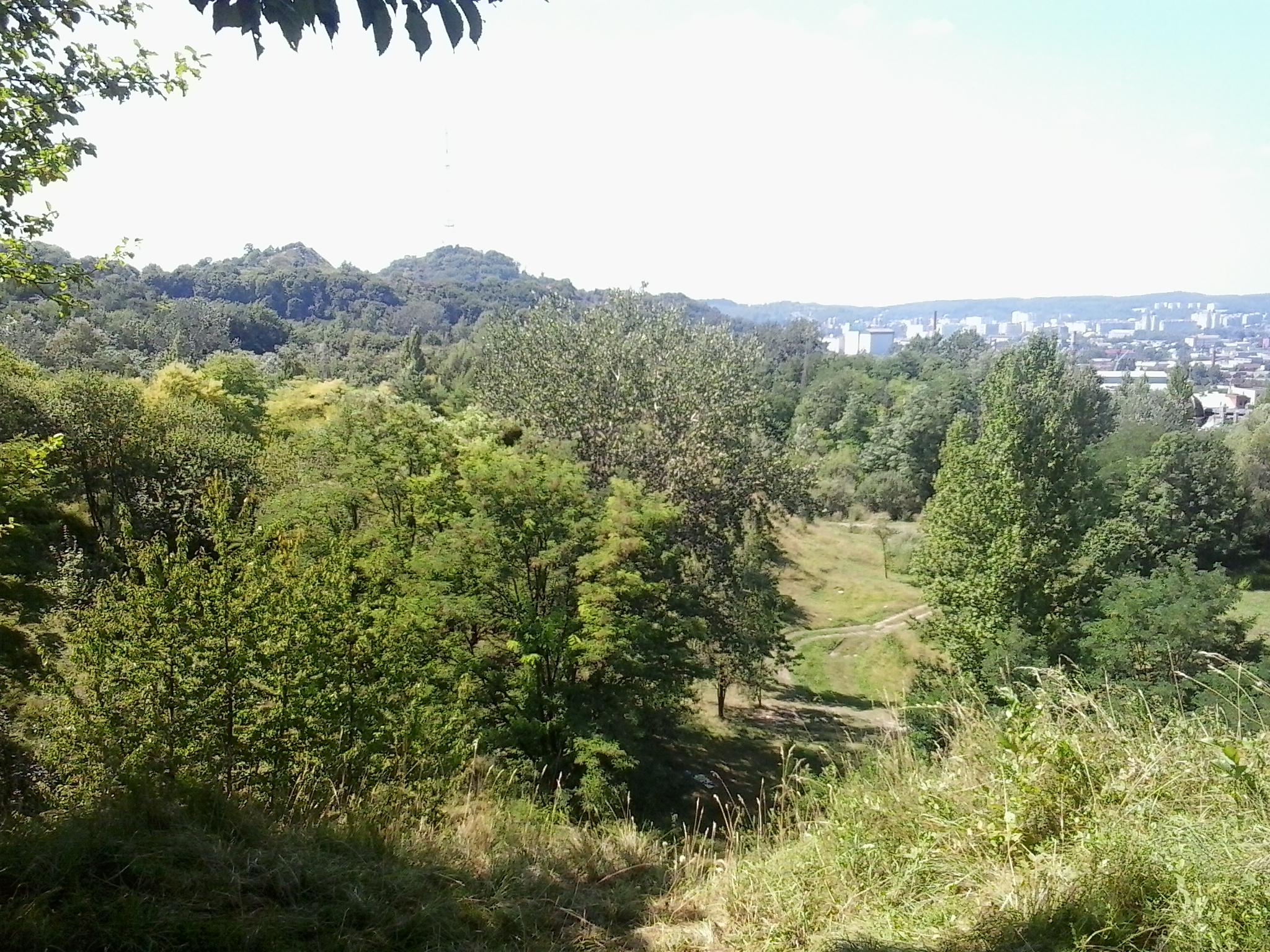
View over the northern part of the park

== Natural points of interest ==
The highest point of the park is Leva (Lion's) Mountain (389 m above sea level) and is declared a geological monument of nature. As traces of the sea covered the landscape 20-25 million years ago, marks of shells of extinct mollusc can be found in the limestone. A well-maintained path to the top of Leva Mountain starts at Dovbusha Street. It is also easy to reach by feet coming from the High Castle (Vysokyi Zamok) and Kryvonosa Street.

In the eastern part of the park Khomec' Mountain (306 m above sea level) is situated – a unique monument of steppe and rock vegetation, as sleep-grass dev'yasyl, tarragon and flax can be found here. Further interesting natural spots are

- „Stara Strilnycya” park,
- Stefana Mountain,
- Baba Mountain,
- the streams of Hlybokyj and Khomec'.

A part of the park's forest carries the name “Kaiserwald”. It was established during rule of the Austro-Hungarian Empire and dedicated the Austrian emperor who was visiting the place. Park visitors can cross it on the so-called Kaiser-Pass. It is widely vegetated by pine and spruce as well as birch and red oak. In spring the colourful blossoms on pear, cherry and apple trees can be observed here. In the early 20th century the area served as a sports ground of the Ukrainian Sokil society.

== Historical points of interest ==
Park Znesinnya contains a huge variety of traces of the past, such as relics of old settlements, churches, monasteries, sacral objects and an old cemetery. Furthermore, one can find examples of industrial construction from the beginning of the 20th century, former sandpits, stone quarries as well as traditional cottages.

Important archaeological sites inside Park Znesinnya are:

- the relics of fortified settlement and worship on Baba Mountain (9th – 11th century; 13th century),
- the settlement at the Svitovydove Field (10th – 11th century),
- the foundations of a defensive tower (13th – the beginning of the 14th century) that earlier were a place of worship and defence in the 9th – 5th century B.C. and are currently occupied by the St. Illya Greek-Catholic Church from the 17th century.

An important historical place is the old Znesinnya cemetery (19th century) with the common military grave of the Ukrainian Sitchovi Stril’ci (Sitch Riflemen), unique in Lviv as the only military one not destroyed after World War II, the grave of the Talerhof concentration camp prisoners, and other historical graves.

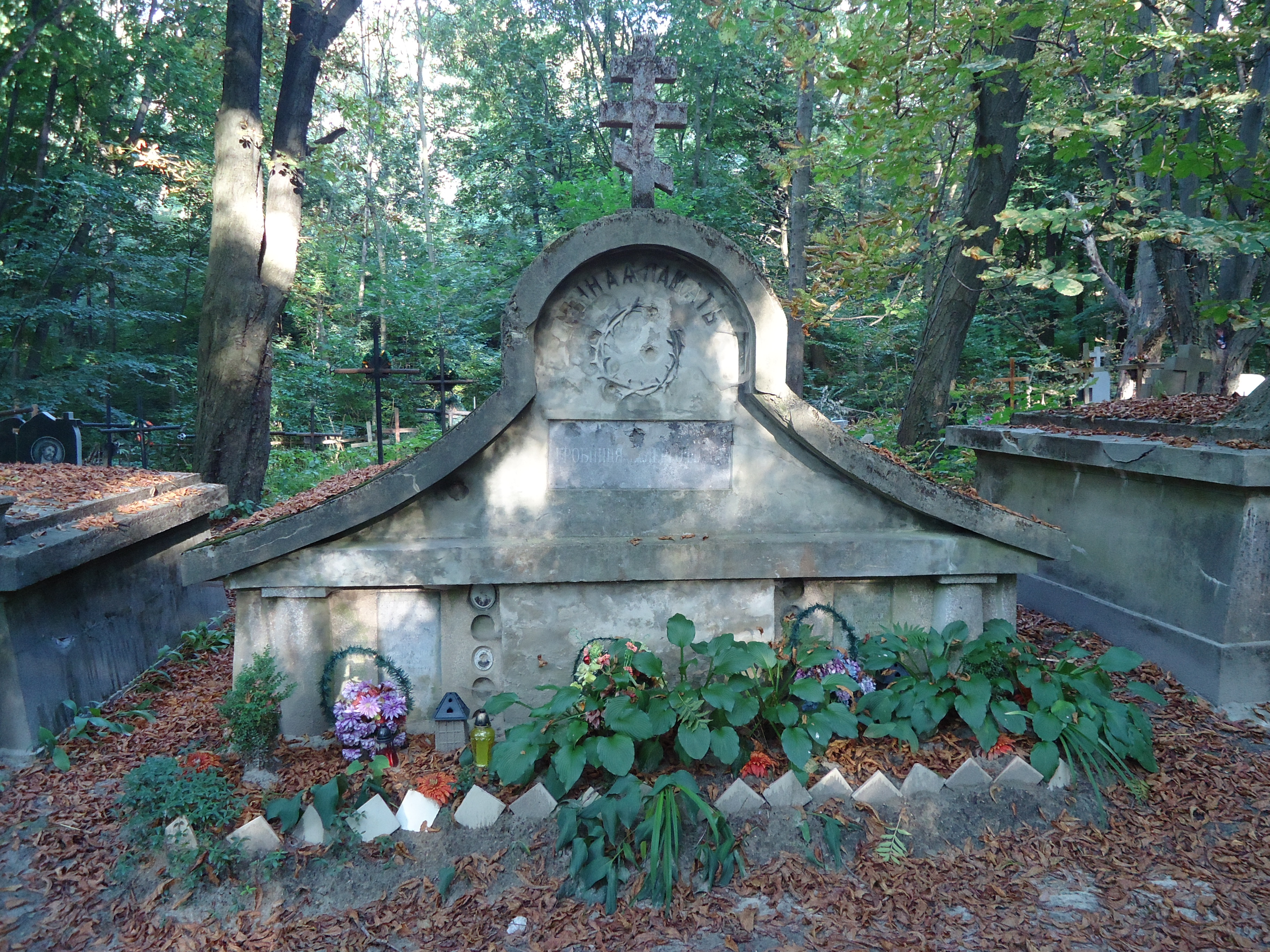
Common grave of the Talerhof concentration camp prisoners

One of Lviv's most popular tourist spot is the Museum of Folk Architecture in Shevchenkivskyi Hay (Shevchenkivskyi Grove). Here examples of 17th – 20th century Ukrainian architecture as well as some rich ethnographic collection are shown. St. Mykola Church from the 18th century is as well located here.

Further architectural and religious points of interest are:

- the St. Illya Church (17th century),
- the Woyciekh Monastery Complex (16th century),
- the Ascension of Jesus Church (beginning of the 20th century) situated at the place of a former wooden church from the 16th century.

Moreover, examples of housing and industrial buildings – an alcohol and pharmaceutical factory from the beginning of the 20th century – can be found inside Park Znesinnya.

== Activities ==
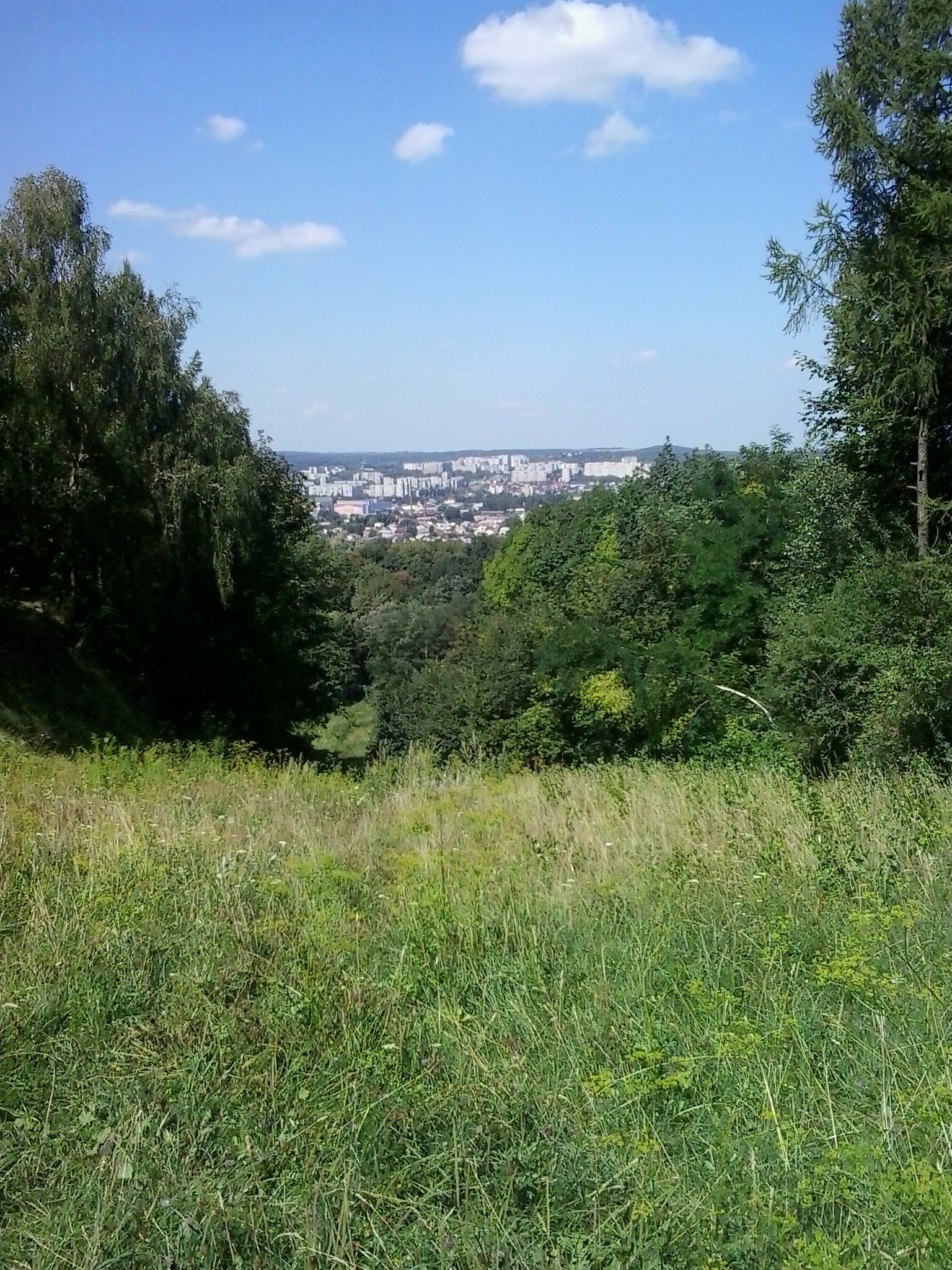
Ski slope during summer

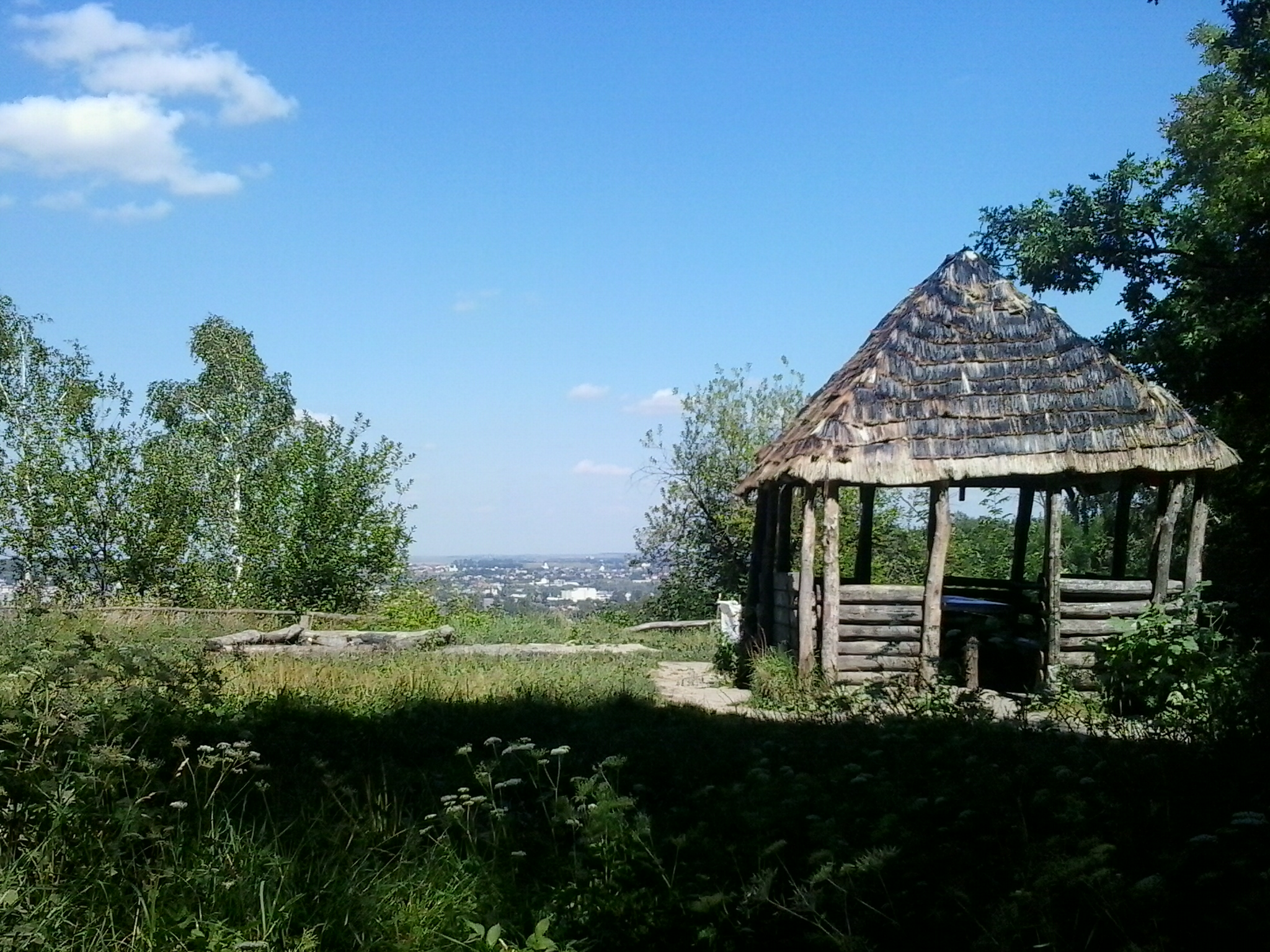
Hut for picknicks

The park area is having a convenient microclimate and is a suitable choice of options for ecotourism as it provides various opportunities for recreation. It has a number of forest tracks and viewpoints. People use Znesinnya area for a variety of sports such as running, hiking, cycling, skate-boarding, gymnastics and fishing. Providing a ski slope Znesinnya is Lviv's top spot for skiing and sledging in wintertime. There are historical railways placed inside the park's territory which are unsteadily used for historical tourist trains.

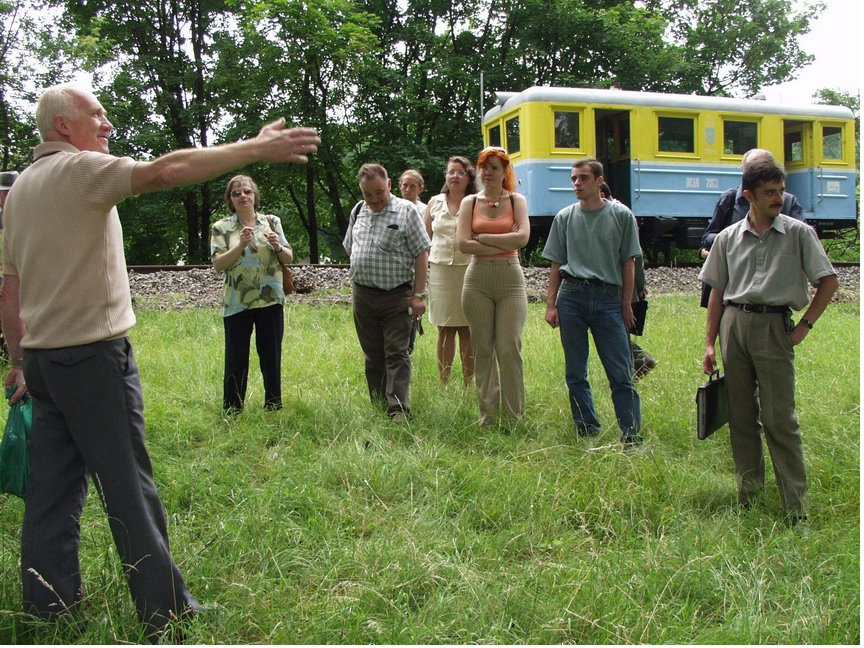
Touristic train on a tour through the park

== Education ==
The park contains an educational center that offers trainings in natural environment monitoring and environmental-friendly management of natural resources to pupils and students. In summer international environmental youth camps are organized.

== Threats to the park ==
Besides erosion of the soil and trash on the area, Park Znesinnya is currently threatened by illegal logging and illegal construction sites inside the park boundaries.
