= Kryvka Church =

Wooden church in Lviv, Ukraine

Coordinates: 49°50′41.4″N 24°3′59″E

Kryvka Church St. Nicholas's Church
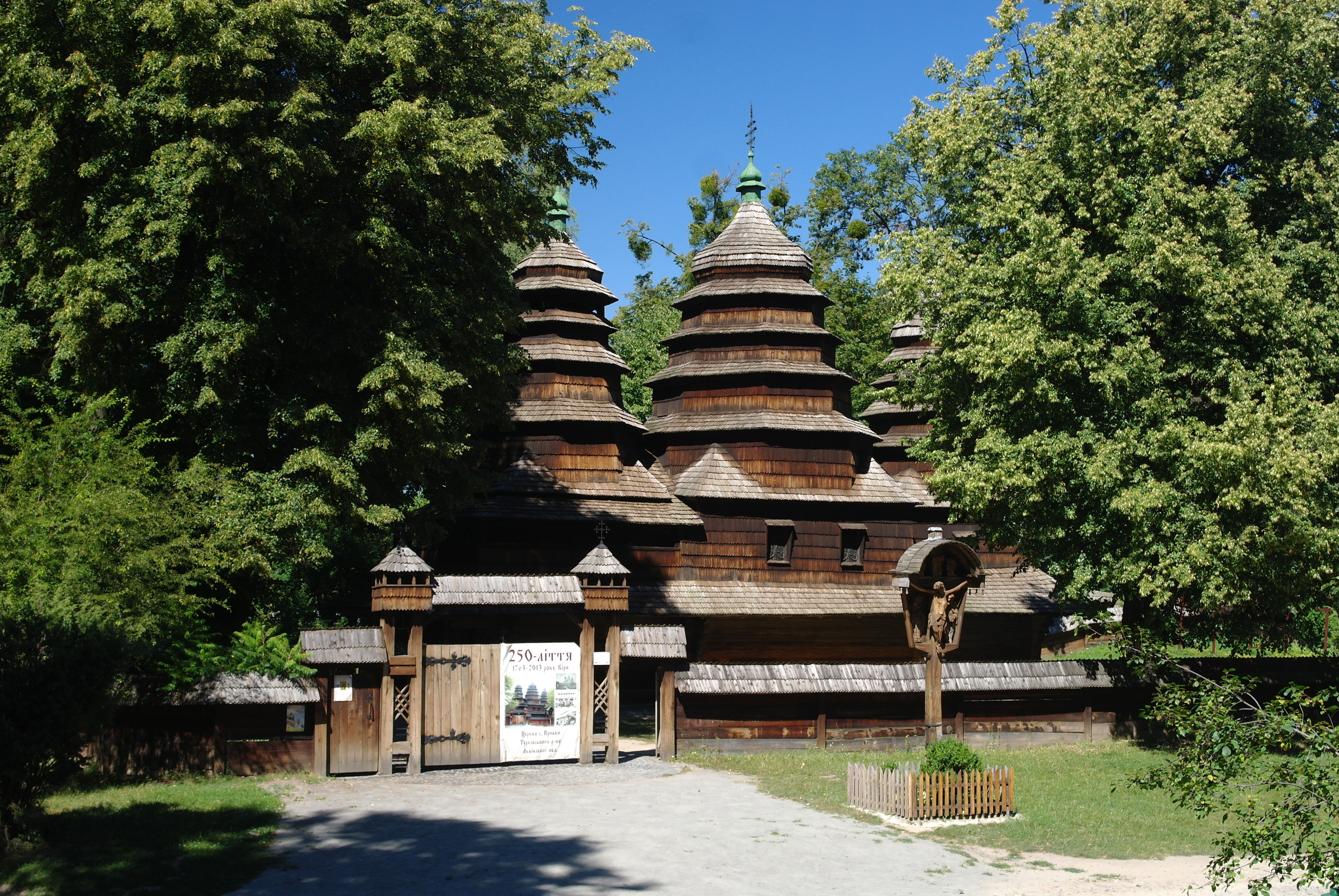

Religion
- Affiliation: Ukrainian Greek Catholic Church

Location
- Location: Kryvka
- Interactive map of Kryvka Church; St. Nicholas's Church

Architecture
- Completed: 1763

St. Nicholas's Church is the centerpiece of the Lviv Museum of Folk Architecture and Culture, better known as Shevchenkivskyi Hai, located on the lands of the former Kaiserwald park. It is also part of the Lavra of Saint John of the Ukrainian Studite Monks. This traditional tripartite timber church, encircled by a wooden fence, was transferred in 1930 to Lviv from Kryvka village, now in Sambir Raion, Lviv Oblast. It was originally built by Boiko carpenters in 1763. During the First World War the church was damaged by a shell that pierced the upper gallery.

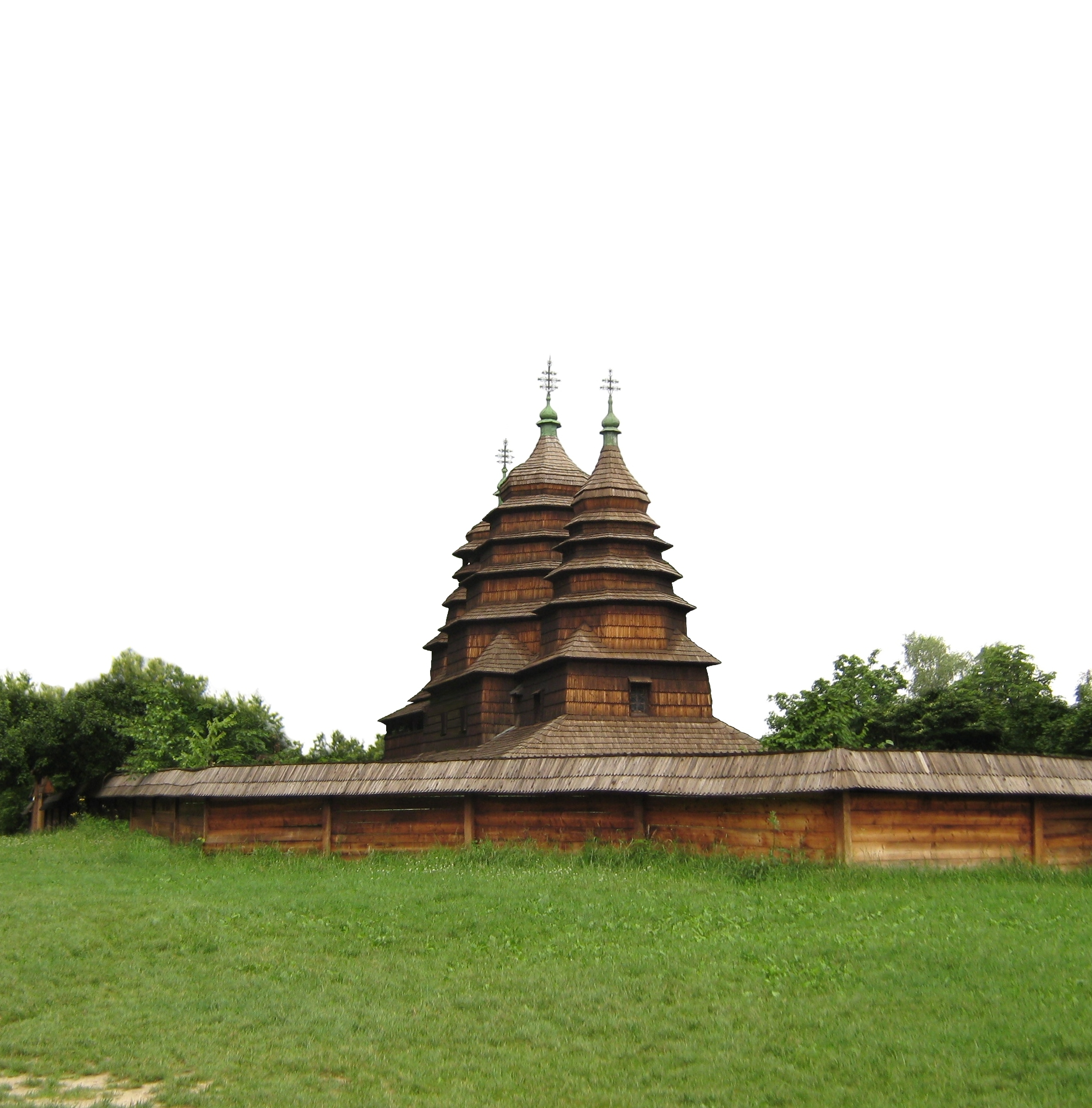
Kryvka, Turka district, L`viv region, St Nicholas church, 1763

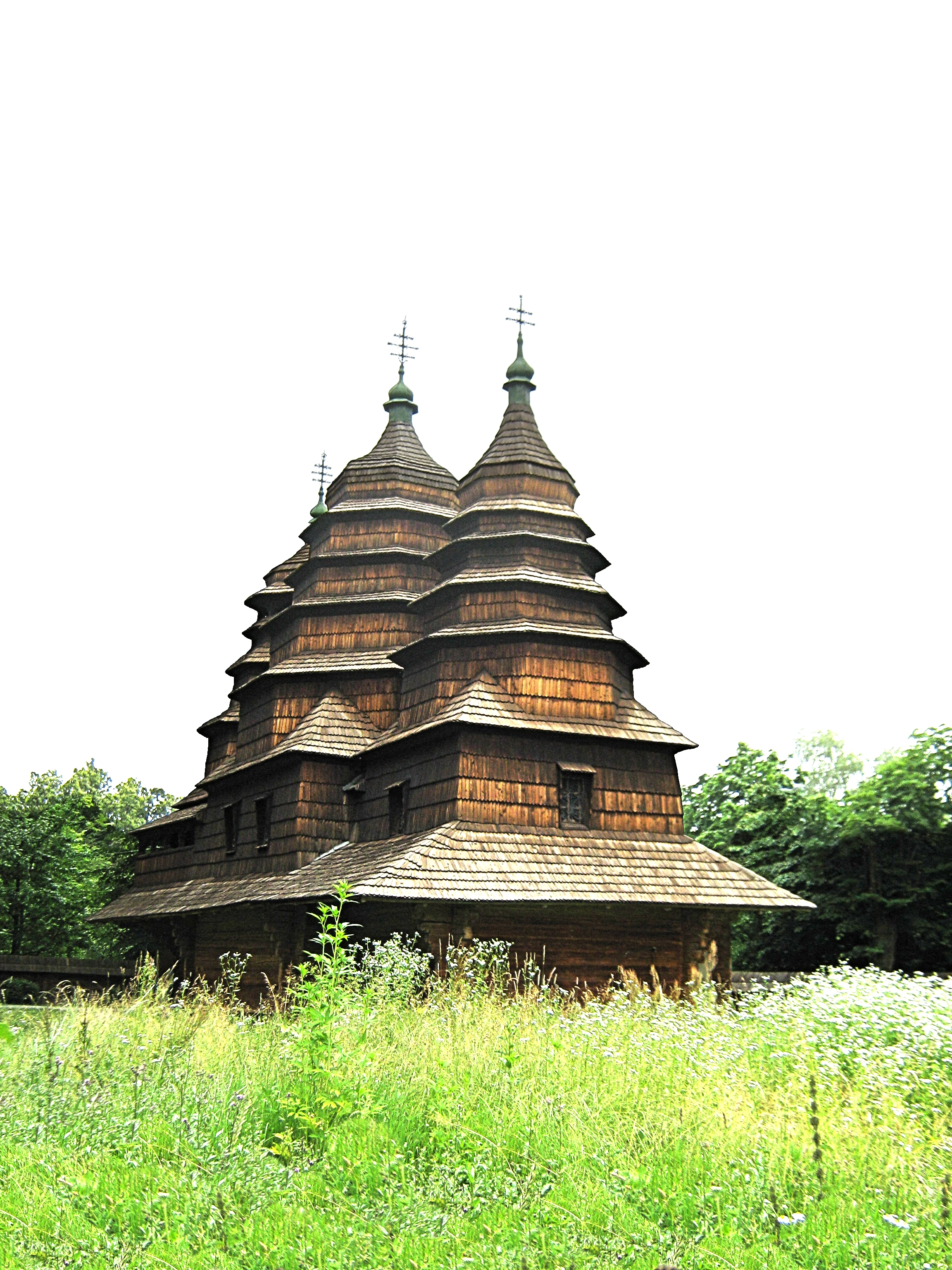
Kryvka, Turka district, L`viv region, St Nicholas church, 1763

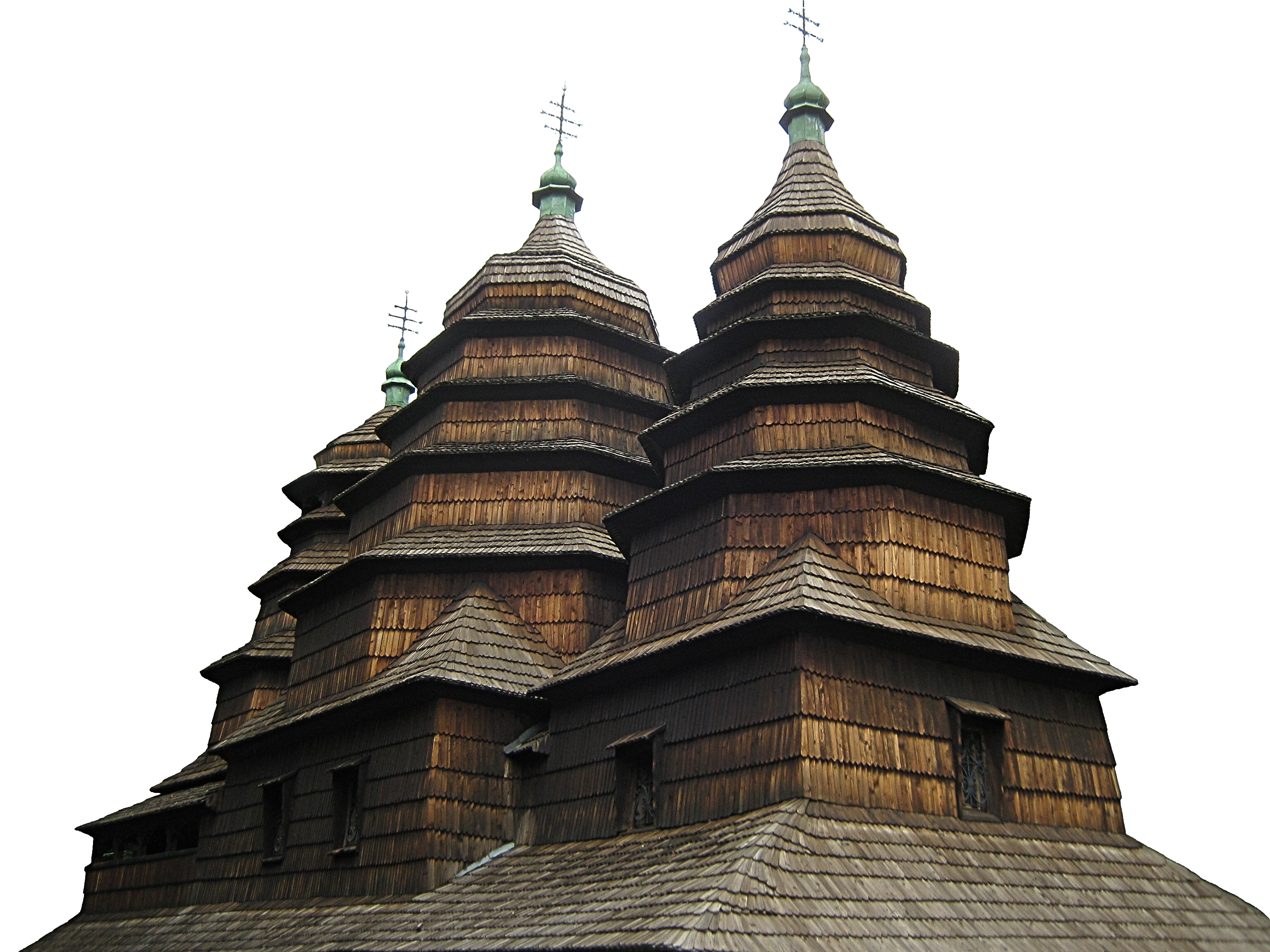
Kryvka, Turka district, L`viv region, St Nicholas church, 1763

== See also ==
- Wooden Churches of Ukraine
- Carpathian Wooden Churches
- Wooden Churches of Southern Little Poland
- Vernacular architecture of the Carpathians
- St. George's Church, Drohobych

== S0urces ==
- Памятники градостроительства и архитектуры Украинской ССР. Киев: Будивельник, 1983–1986. Том 3, с. 84.
