= Lybohora, Sambir Raion =

Village in Lviv Oblast, Ukraine

Lybohora Либохора
- Village
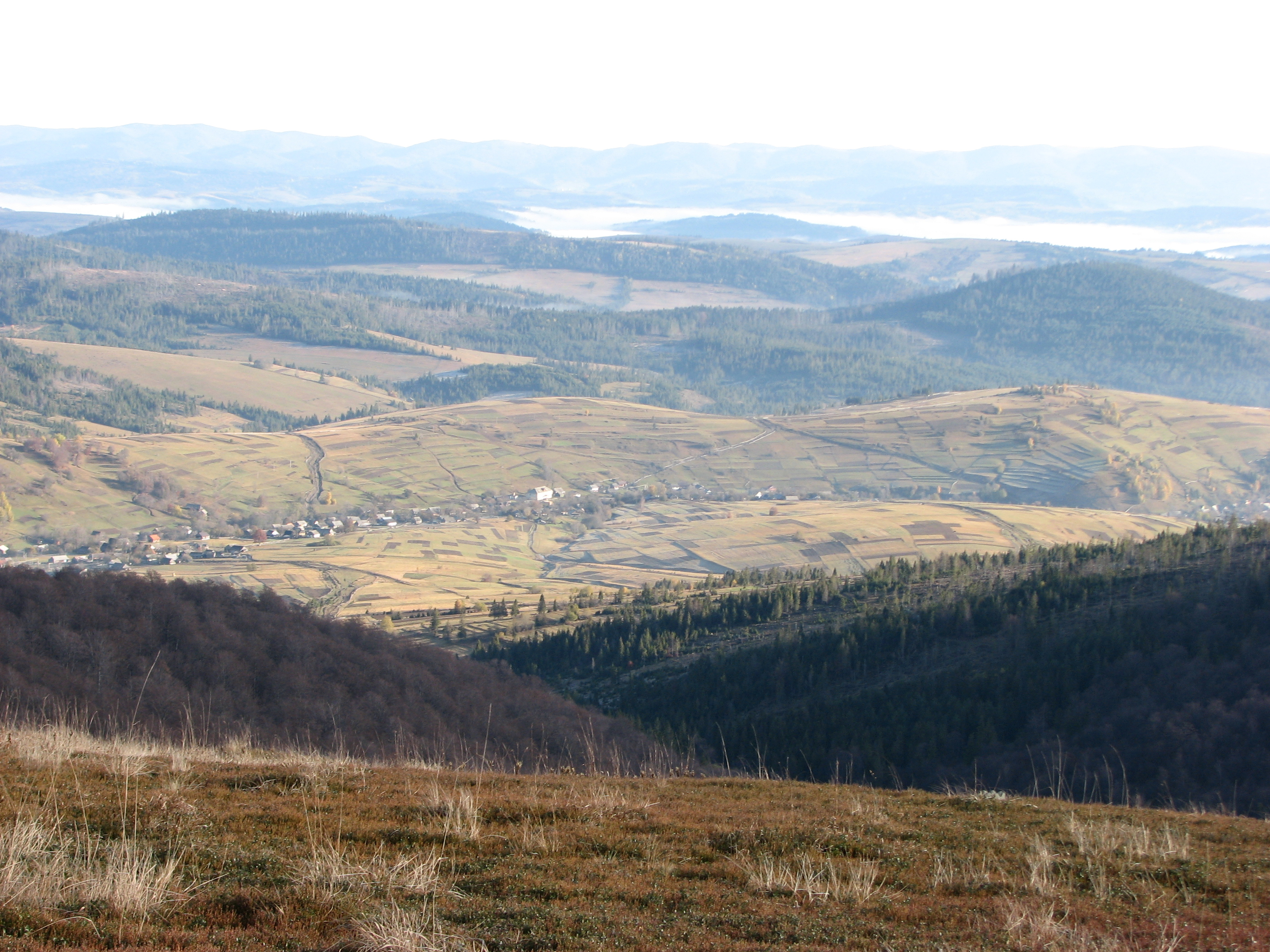
- General view

- Location within Lviv Oblast
- Coordinates: 48°55′26″N 22°56′25″E
- Country: Ukraine
- Oblast: Lviv
- Raion: Sambir
- Area: 5.7 km^{2} (2.2 sq mi)
- Population: 2,302
  - Density: 400/km^{2} (1,000/sq mi)

Lybohora (Ukrainian: Либохора, Polish: Libuchora) is a village (selo) in Sambir Raion, Lviv Oblast, in south-west Ukraine. It belongs to Borynia settlement hromada, one of the hromadas of Ukraine.

The village was established in 1553. It was initially named Aleksanka, after its locator, but later overtook the name of a local stream.

Until 18 July 2020, Lybohora belonged to Turka Raion. The raion was abolished in July 2020 as part of the administrative reform of Ukraine, which reduced the number of raions of Lviv Oblast to seven. The area of Turka Raion was merged into Sambir Raion.
