= Kryvka =

Kryvka Кривка
- Village
- Location within Lviv Oblast
- Coordinates: 48°52′56″N 23°04′22″E
- Country: Ukraine
- Oblast: Lviv
- Raion: Sambir
- Area: 2.8 km^{2} (1.1 sq mi)
- Population: 459
  - Density: 160/km^{2} (420/sq mi)

Kryvka (Ukrainian: Кривка, Polish: Krywka) is a village (selo) in Sambir Raion, Lviv Oblast, in south-west Ukraine. It belongs to Borynia settlement hromada, one of the hromadas of Ukraine.

Kryvka was established as a private village in the late 15th century. An Orthodox church was mentioned here in 1561. There is a Saint Nicholais Orthodox church, built in 1928 in the Ukrainian national style. The older Greek Catholic church built here in 1765 was moved to the open-air museum in Lviv in 1930.

Until 18 July 2020, Kryvka belonged to Turka Raion. The raion was abolished in July 2020 as part of the administrative reform of Ukraine, which reduced the number of raions of Lviv Oblast to seven. The area of Turka Raion was merged into Sambir Raion.
