= Vyshnia, Lviv Oblast =

Rural locality in Lviv Oblast, Ukraine

Vyshnia Вишня
- Village
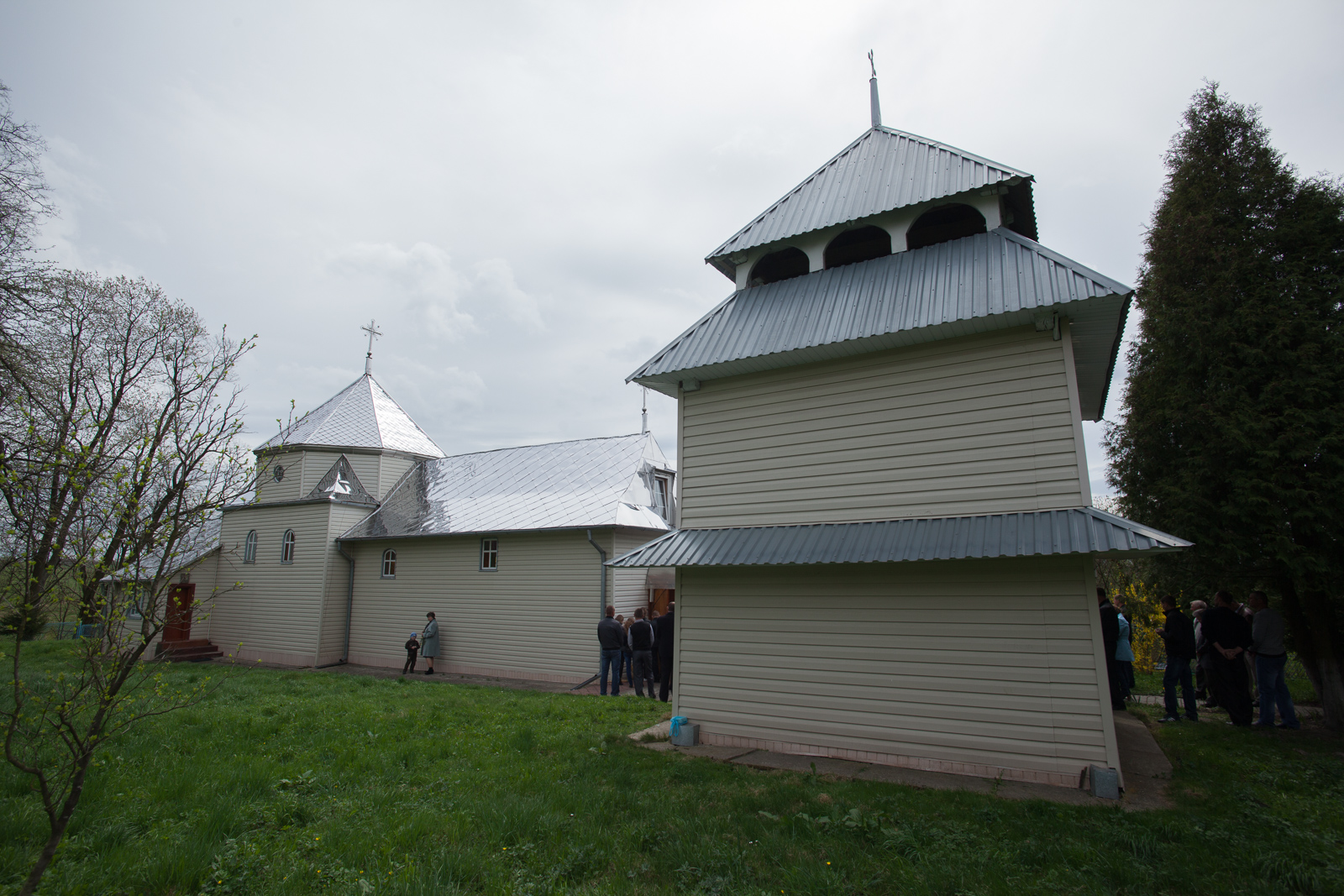
- Vyshnia wooden church

- Location within Lviv Oblast
- Coordinates: 49°40′36″N 23°28′59″E
- Country: Ukraine
- Oblast: Lviv Oblast
- District: Sambir Raion
- Established: 1438

Area
  - Total: 4,290 km^{2} (1,660 sq mi)
- Elevation /(average value of): 264 m (866 ft)

Population
  - Total: 1,819
  - Density: 0.424/km^{2} (1.10/sq mi)
- Time zone: UTC+2 (EET)
  - Summer (DST): UTC+3 (EEST)
- Postal code: 81540
- Area code: +380 3231
- Website: село Вишня/райцентр Городок ^{(Ukrainian)}

Vyshnia (Ukrainian: Ви́шня), formerly known as Benkova Vyshnia (Ukrainian: Бенькова Вишня) – is a village in Sambir Raion, Lviv Oblast of western Ukraine. It belongs to Rudky urban hromada, one of the hromadas of Ukraine. The population of the village is about 1819 people.

== Geography ==
The village Vyshnia is located at a distance of 2 kilometres (1.2 mi) from the Highway Ukraine ( H 13) – Lviv – Sambir – Uzhhorod. Area of the village totals is 4,29 km^{2} and is located along the Vyshnia River (a right tributary of the San River) on the altitude of 264 metres (870 ft) above sea level.
A distance from Vyshnia to Horodok is 24 kilometres (15 mi), to the regional center of Lviv is 48 kilometres (30 mi) and 3 kilometres (1.9 mi) to Rudky.

== History and Attractions ==
The first written record of the village dates from 1438. In the 18th century these lands belonged to the family Urbanski. Fredro family had settled in the village Bieńkowa Wisznia in 1797.
In the village is an architectural monument of local importance of Horodok Raion, Lviv Oblast. It is a wooden Church of Saints Cosmas and Damian (1805).

Until 18 July 2020, Vyshnia belonged to Horodok Raion. The raion was abolished in July 2020 as part of the administrative reform of Ukraine, which reduced the number of raions of Lviv Oblast to seven. The area of Horodok Raion was merged into Lviv Raion, however, Vyshnia was transferred to Sambir Raion.

== Famous people ==
Aleksander Fredro lived on the family estate in the Benkova Vyshnia.

== Literature ==
- Історія міст і сіл УРСР : Львівська область, Городоцький район, Вишня. – К. : ГРУРЕ, 1968 р. Page 257 (in Ukrainian)
