= Fredro (Bończa) =

Polish noble family

Coat of Arms of Counts Fredro, incorporated with Bończa coat of arms

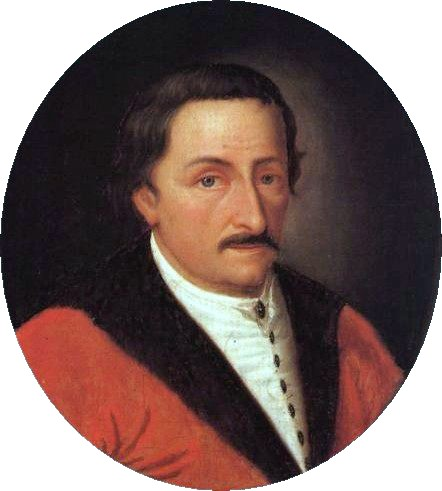
Andrzej Maksymilian Fredro

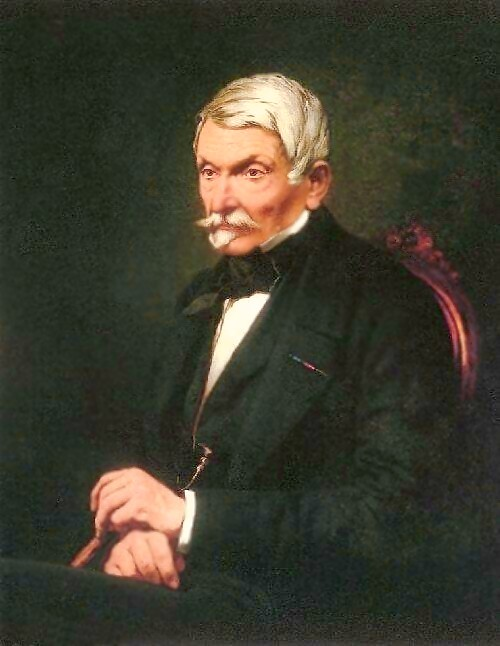
Aleksander Fredro

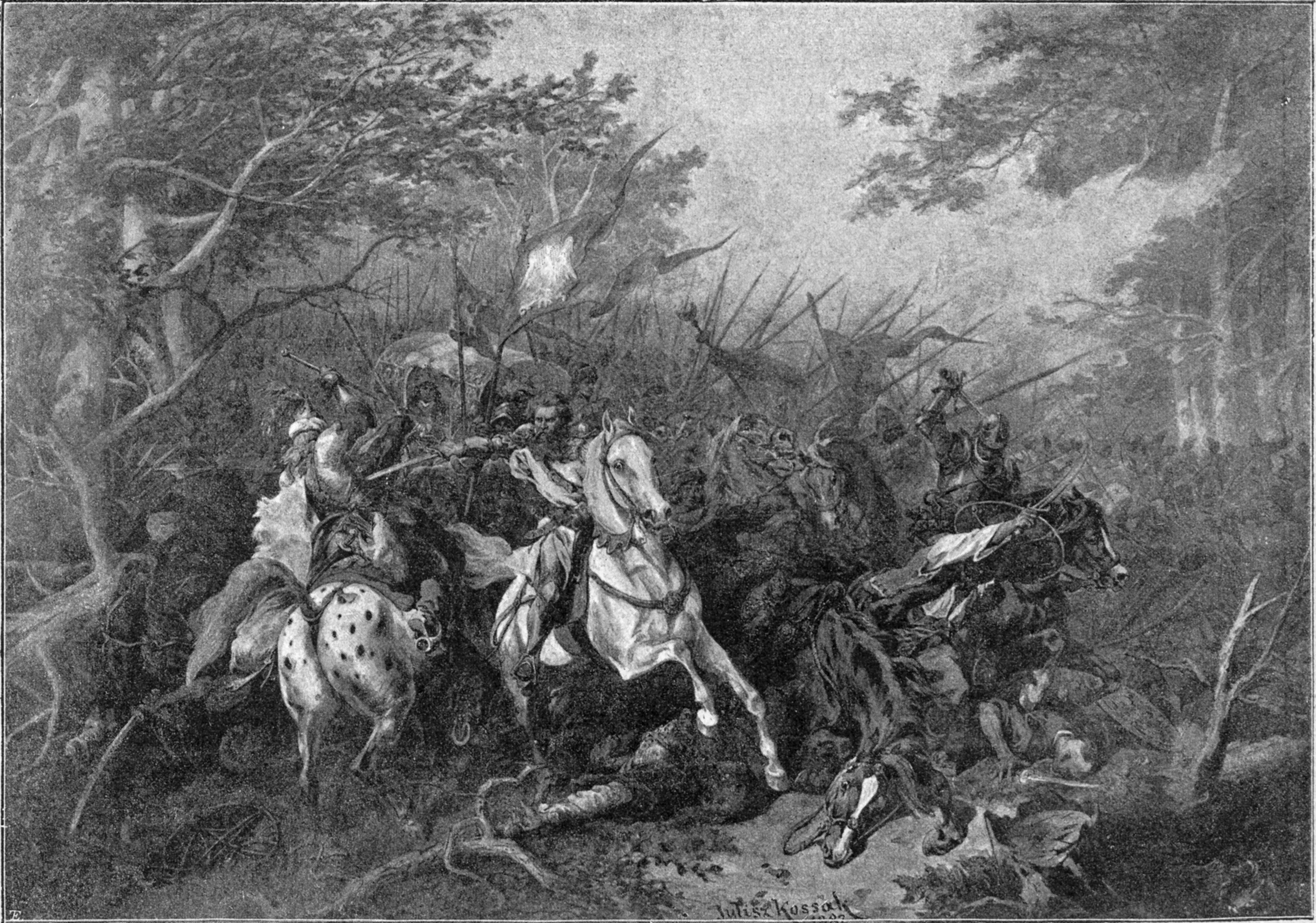
Jan Fredro saving King Jan Olbracht on Bukovina, painting by Juliusz Kossak.

The Fredro family (plural: Fredrowie, feminine form: Fredrówna or Fredrowa ) was an old Polish noble family originated from Silesia or Moravia.

== History ==
Firstly mentioned in 1407. From the 15th until the 19th century their family seat was Pleszowice near Przemyśl. Members of the family held the title of Count in Austria, awarded to them by Francis I of Austria on 23 July 1822.

== Notable members ==
- Aleksander Fredro
- Andrzej Maksymilian Fredro

== Coat of arms ==
The Fredro family used the Bończa coat of arms.

Comital coat of arms

== Residences ==
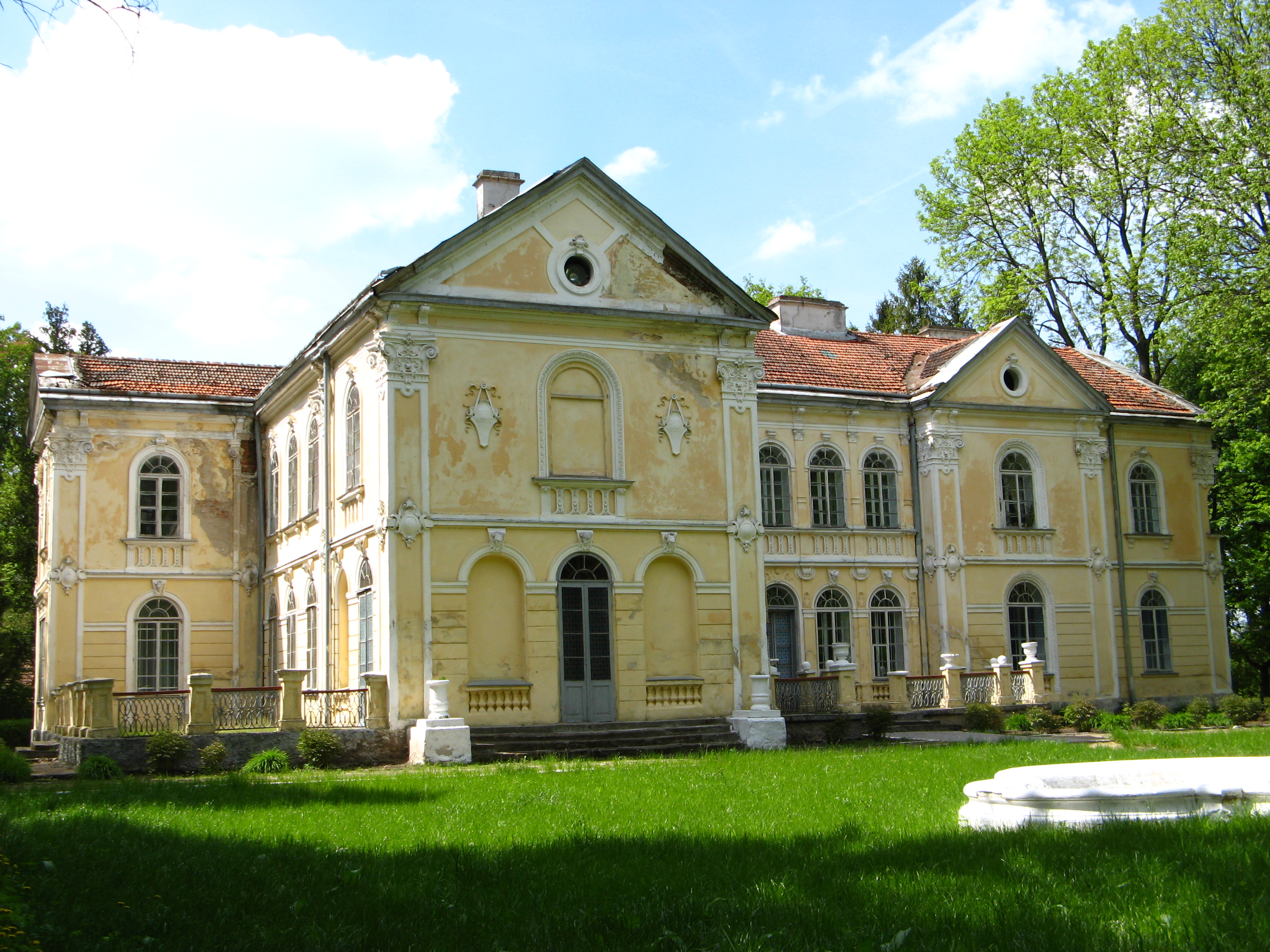
Ruined Palace of Fredro in Wisznia

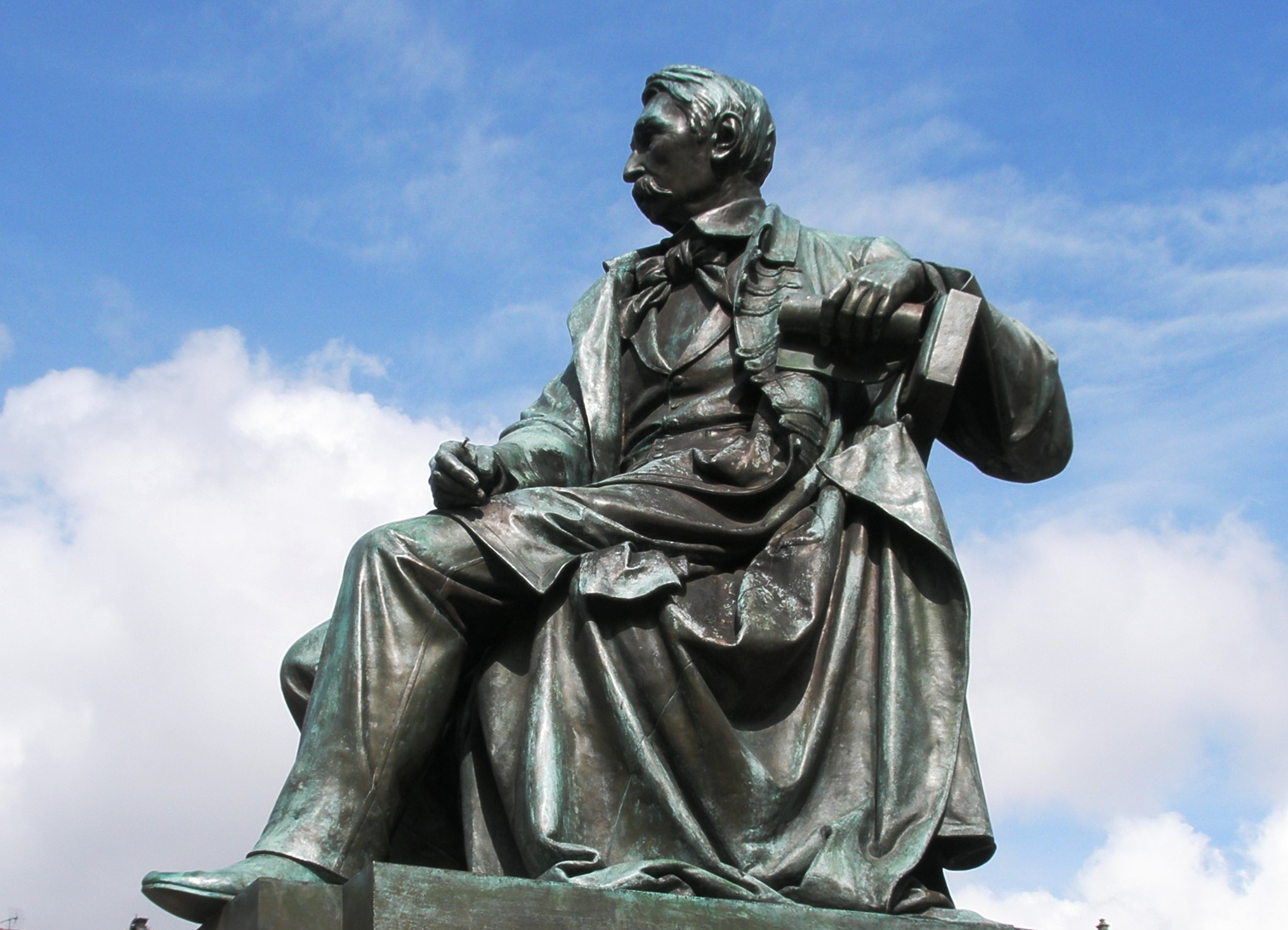
Monument of Aleksander Fredro (formerly in Lwów, today in Wrocław)

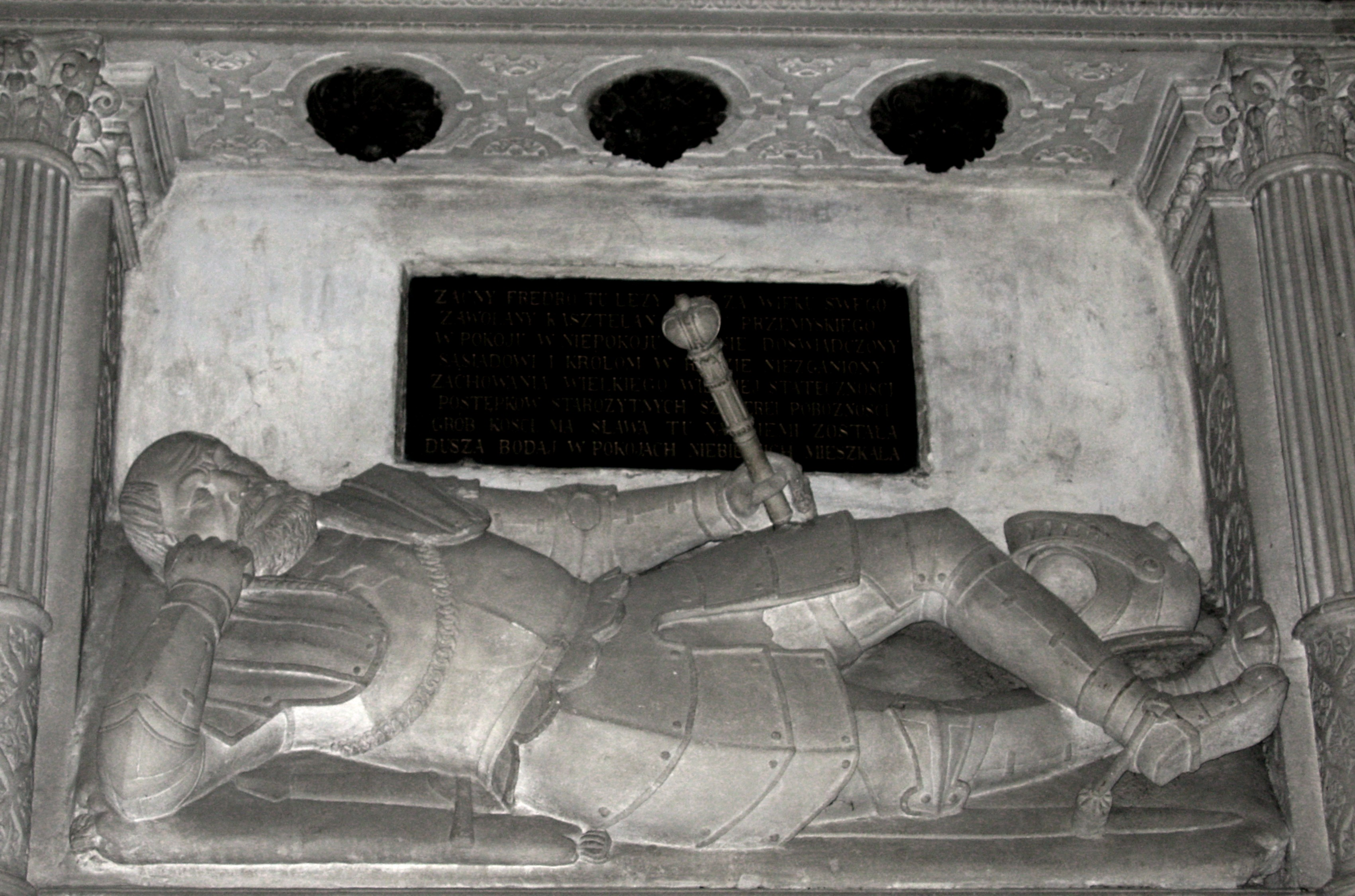
Tomb monument of Jan Fredro in the Cathedral of Przemyśl

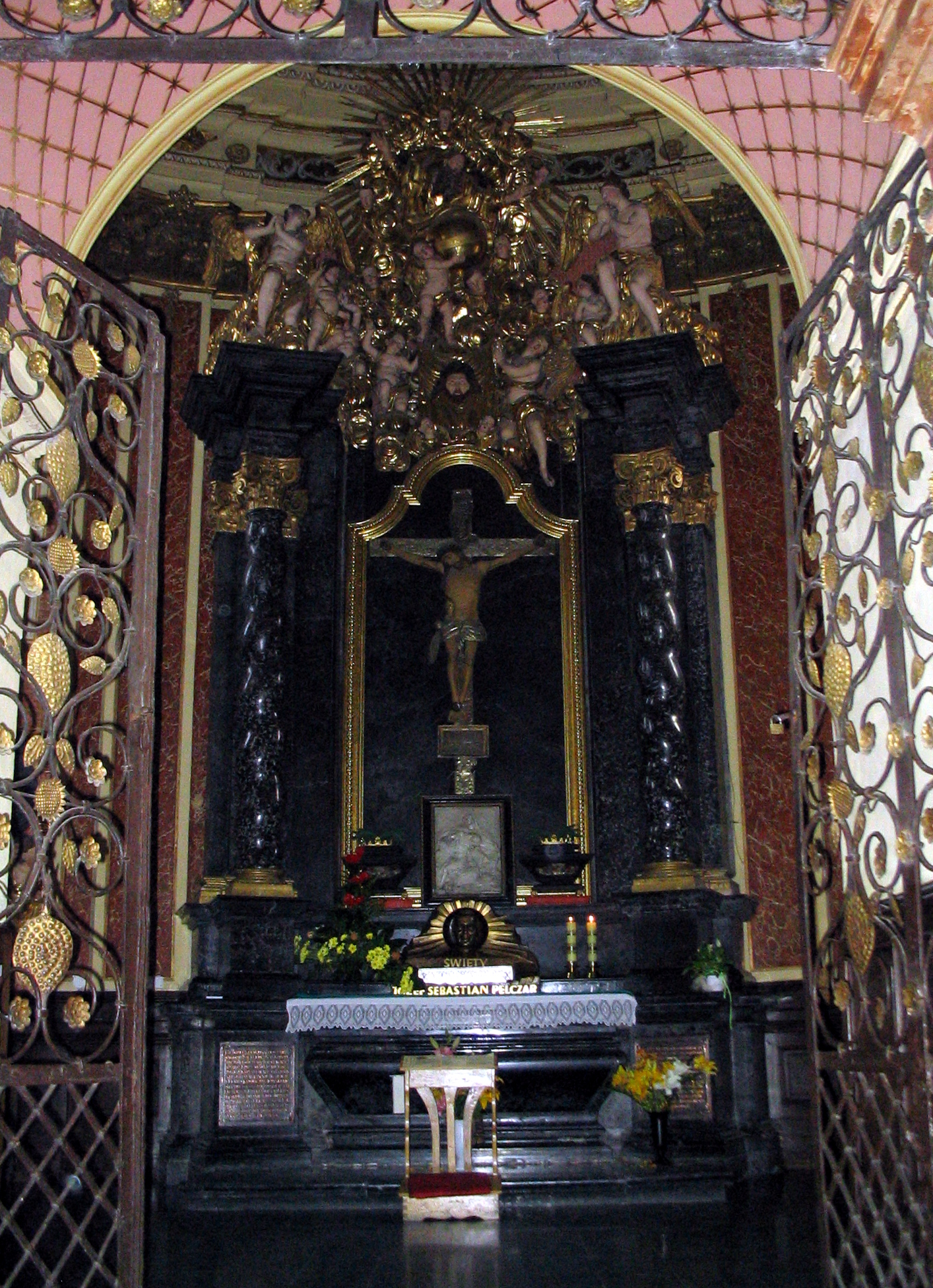
Fredro Chapel in the Cathedral of Przemyśl

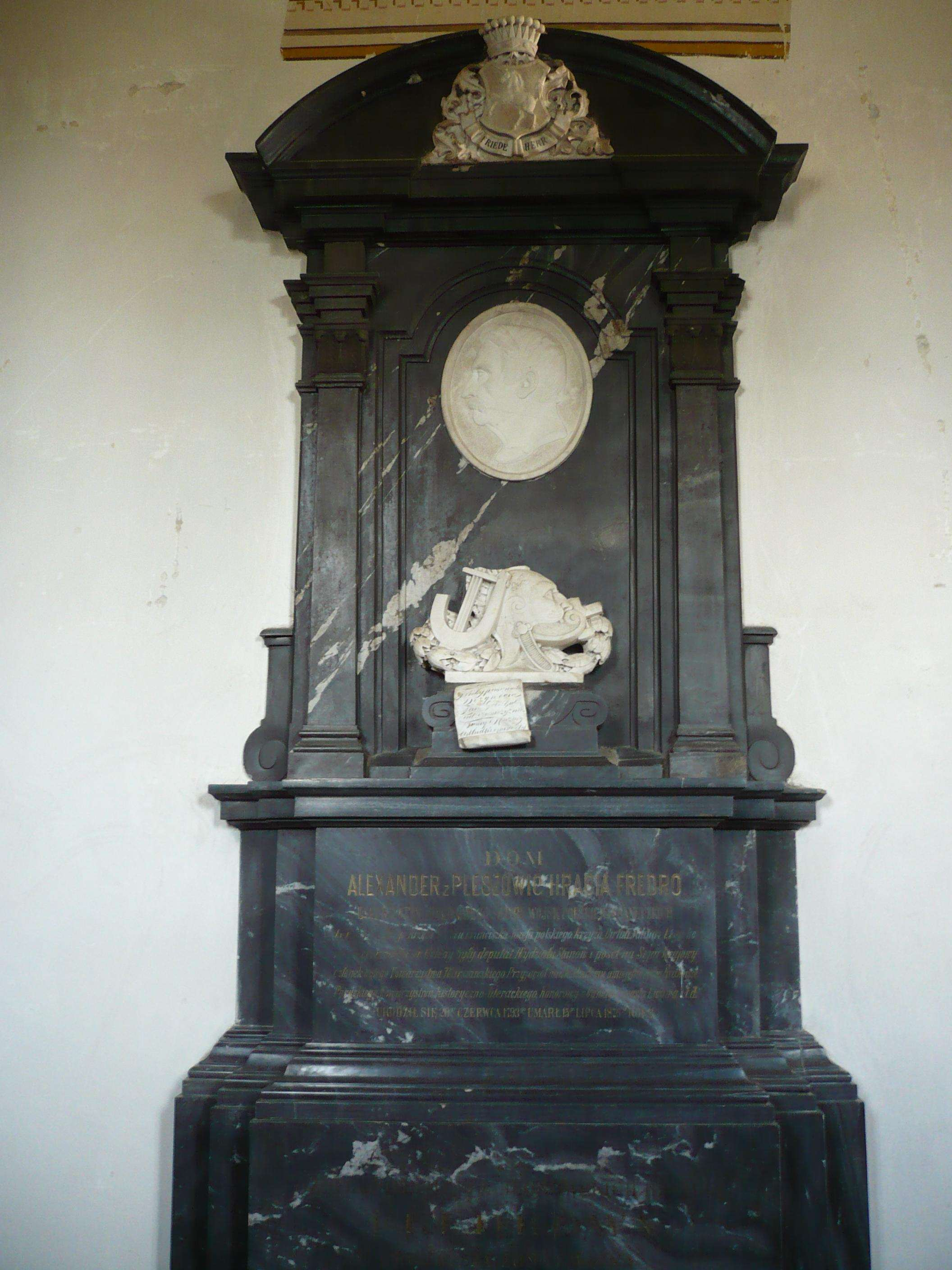
Epitafium of Aleksander Fredro in Rudky

== Bibliography ==
- Poczet szlachty galicyjskiéj i bukowińskiéj. s. 63
- Jerzy Sewer Dunin-Borkowski (hrabia). Almanach błękitny: genealogia żyjących rodów polskich. 1908. s. 174.
- Kwartalnik historyczny, Tom 19. Towarzystwo Historyczne (Lwów, Poland), (Polska Akademia Nauk) 1905
- Witold Taszycki. Onomastica, Tomy 11-12
- Kazimierz Rymut. Nazwiska Polaków. t. I, (zob. Frydrych)
