= Chernykhiv =

Chernykhiv (Ukrainian: Чернихів) may refer to the following places in Ukraine:

- Chernykhiv, Lviv Oblast, a village in Sambir Raion, Lviv Oblast
- Chernykhiv, Ternopil Oblast, a village in Ternopil Raion, Ternopil Oblast
