= Andrzej Maksymilian Fredro =

Polish szlachcic and writer

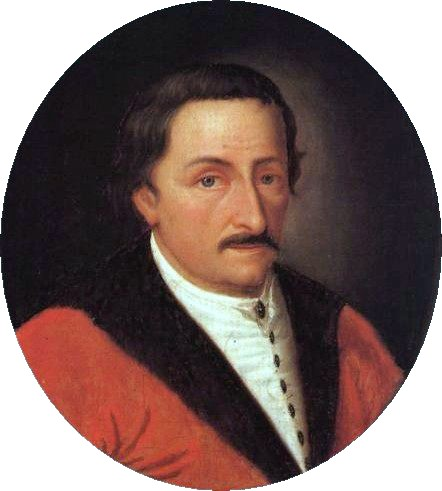
- Coat of arms: Bończa
- Born: 1620; Przemyśl land
- Died: 15 June 1679 (aged 58–59); Przemyśl
- Family: House of Fredro

Philosophical work
- Era: Baroque philosophy
- Region: Western philosophy: Polish philosophy
- School: Aristotelianism; Sarmatism; Neostoicism; Mercantilism; Cameralism
- Main interests: Economics; Historiography; Military theory; Pedagogy; Politics

Andrzej Maksymilian Fredro (1620 – 15 June 1679) was a Polish szlachcic and writer.

== Biography ==
Andrzej Maksymilian Fredro was born in 1620. He studied at the Cracow Academy.

He was castellan of Lwów from 1654 and voivode of the Podolian Voivodeship from 1676. He was Marshal of the Sejm (zwyczajny) from 16 January to 11 March 1652 in Warsaw. At that sejm Władysław Siciński used liberum veto for the first time. Fredro fortified Przemyśl in 1658–1660.

He died on 15 June 1679. In his political writing, Fredro argues that liberum veto is necessary for a republic as big as the Polish–Lithuanian Commonwealth. When one region of the Commonwealth falls into crisis, nobles from other regions may not be fully aware of the danger. Decision by majority in the Sejm is dangerous for such a big republic, because it enables the majority to ignore the interests of a particular region which has gotten into difficulty and asks the nation for help.

He was married to Katarzyna Gidzińska.

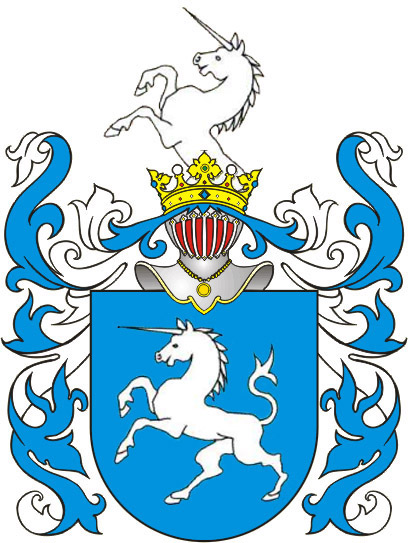
Bończa Coat of Arms

== Works ==
- Gestorum Populi Poloni sub Henrico Valesio (1652)
- Przysłowia mów potocznych (1658)
- Scriptorum seu togae et belli notationum fragmenta (1660)
- Monita politicomoralia (1664)
- Militarium seu axiomatum belli (1668)
- Epistola ad amicum (1669)
- Vir Consilii (1730, released after his death)

== See also ==
- Stanislaus Orichovius Polonus
- Aleksander Fredro
