= Chłędowski coat of arms =

Polish coat of arms

Chłędowski baron coat of arms: Quarterly Bończa and Pfaffenhofen bestowed in 1885 by Emperor Francis Joseph I

This noble family traces its origins to the territorial County of Gniezno in the Voivodeship of Greater Poland. There in the administrative district of Gmina Witkowo is the village of Chłądowo. In 1692 Chłądowo (at the time called Chłędowo) was owned by the Chłędowski family. This branch of the family belongs to the Gryf Clan.

Seweryn Chłędowski, a prominent member of the family purchased the estates of Wietrzno in the Kingdom of Galicia and Lodomeria in 1810. From this branch Freiherr Adam von Chłędowski of the Bończa Clan married Ida Pfaff von Pfaffenhofen, the adopted daughter of Count Franz Simon Pfaff von Pfaffenhofen (1753–1840). From this marriage issued 2 sons Ludwig and Casimir, who received from Emperor Francis Joseph I the hereditary title of Baron and the right to use the name Chłędowski von Pfaffenhofen.
