= Stanisława Rachwałowa =

Polish activist (1903–1985)

- Born: Stanisława Surówka; 29 June 1903; Rudky, Austria-Hungary
- Died: 18 October 1985 (aged 82); Rzeszów, People's Republic of Poland
- Resting place: Wilkowyja Cemetery, Rzeszów
- Occupation: Activist
- Years active: 1939–1956
- Organization(s): Union of Armed Struggle; Armed Forces Delegation for Poland; Freedom and Independence Association
- Known for: Being part of the Polish resistance against the German occupation and communist rule
- Criminal charges: Espionage
- Criminal penalty: Death (later commuted to life imprisonment)
- Criminal status: Released
- Spouse: Zygmunt Rachwał (1923–1943; his death)
- Children: 2

Stanisława Rachwałowa (née Surówka; 29 June 1903 – 18 October 1985) was a Polish woman who was part of the resistance movements against both the German occupation of Poland during World War II, and the subsequent communist government of the Polish People's Republic. She has been retrospectively described by some historians as "Witold Pilecki in a skirt".

== Early life and education ==
Rachwałowa was born on 29 June 1903 in Rudky, in what was then the Kingdom of Galicia and Lodomeria, a constituent part of Austria-Hungary. She was raised in a patriotic Polish family; her father, Karol, was a lawyer, while her mother, Emilia (née Tustanowska), came from a prominent land-owning family. After a brief period living in Vienna, the family returned to Lwów Rachwałowa graduated from the Ursuline Sisters' Gymnasium. In addition to Polish, she spoke French, German and Italian.

In 1923, Rachwałowa married Zygmunt Rachwał, an officer for the Polish Armed Forces and the State Police in what was then the Second Polish Republic. They had two daughters, Anna and Krystyna; Krystyna went by the name Katarzyna. During the interwar period, the family lived in various cities, including Łódź, Katowice, Kraków and Myślenice.

== Activism ==
=== German occupation of Poland ===
Following the German occupation of Poland in September 1939, Rachwałowa and her family attempted to flee Kraków. They were arrested by Soviet forces; while Rachwálowa was able to bribe a soldier to release her and her daughters, Zygmunt was deported to a labour camp in Siberia, where he later joined the Anders' Army; he died in 1943 in the Middle East while attempting to return to Poland. Rachwałowa did not learn of her husband's death until after the war.

During the winter of 1939, Rachwałowa began working for the Polish resistance in Kraków, completing counterintelligence work for the Union of Armed Struggle (ZWZ) under Jan Hartwig. She used various pseudonyms at the time, including Herbert, Herburta, Rysiek and Ryś. The family's home at 5 Sobieskiego Street became a refuge for activists from across Lesser Poland.

In April 1941, Rachwałowa was arrested by the Gestapo in Kraków. During her subsequent interrogation, she was tortured, losing nine teeth. After a month in detention, Rachwałowa was released with funds paid by the ZWZ, and returned to counterintelligence.

In October 1942, Rachwałowa was arrested for a second time. Considered a "political suspect", in December she was deported from Montelupi Prison in Kraków to the Auschwitz concentration camp, where she was given the identification number 26281. Due to her language abilities, Rachwałowa was tasked with documenting personal items taken from prisoners following their arrival at Auschwitz for the Politische Abteilung. While imprisoned, Rachwałowa joined the camp's resistance movement, sending reports to the Polish underground detailing information about transports, including their arrival dates, where they had come from, and how many prisoners they contained.

On 18 January 1945, as Auschwitz was evacuated, Rachwałowa was transferred to Ravensbrück and later Neustadt-Glewe concentration camps. On 2 May 1945, the camp was liberated by Allied forces. Rachwałowa, who at that time weighed 46 kilograms, was transported to the United Kingdom, where she received medical treatment for three weeks before returning to Kraków.

=== Polish People's Republic ===
In June 1945, soon after arriving back in Poland, Rachwałowa began working for the intelligence service of the Armed Forces Delegation for Poland, part of the Polish anti-communist resistance movement. From September, she also worked for the Freedom and Independence Association, where she used the pseudonym Zygmunt.

On 26 August 1946, Rachwałowa learned that she was among a group of anti-communist activists that the government Security Service intended to detain during a wave of arrests, and that it had learned her address. She travelled to Warsaw, where she hid at the home of Krystyna Żywulska, who she had been imprisoned alongside at Auschwitz. However, on 30 October, Rachwałowa was arrested by Żywulska's husband, Leon Andrzejewski, a security officer for the Polish People's Republic.

Following an 11-month investigation, during which she was detained and tortured, on 29 September 1947 Rachwałowa was sentenced to death as a "spy and traitor to the People's Republic of Poland". After her sentence was deemed "inadequate", she was retried, and on 30 December she was sentenced to the loss of her public and civil rights and the forfeiture of her property, in addition to a death sentence. While on death row, Rachwałowa was held in a cell next door to Maria Mandl, an Austrian woman who had served as Schutzhaftlagerführerin at Auschwitz; Mandl asked Rachwałowa for forgiveness, which Rachwałowa accepted "on behalf of the prisoners".

On 14 February 1948, Bolesław Bierut, the President of Poland, commuted Rachwałowa's sentence to life imprisonment. On 10 May 1955, her sentence was reduced to 15 years' imprisonment and a five-year loss of public and civil rights; on 4 May 1956, following the passing of the Amnesty Act, Rachwałowa's sentence was further reduced to 10 years' imprisonment and a two and a half year loss of her rights. She was released from prison on 30 October 1956 during Polish October.

Following her release from prison, Rachwałowa's poor health prevented her from rejoining the resistance movement against communist rule, though she continued to be under the surveillance from the Security Service for many years.

Rachwałowa died on 18 October 1985 in Rzeszów, and was buried at Wilkowyja Cemetery.
