= Rudky urban hromada =

Hromada in Lviv Oblast, Ukraine

Rudky urban hromada Рудківська міська громада
- Hromada
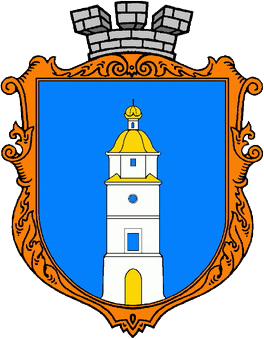
- Seal
- Interactive map of Rudky urban hromada
- Country: Ukraine
- Oblast: Lviv Oblast
- Raion: Sambir Raion
- Admin. center: Rudky

Area
  - Total: 3,028 km^{2} (1,169 sq mi)

Population (2021)
  - Total: 25,339
  - Density: 8.368/km^{2} (21.67/sq mi)
- CATOTTG code: UA46080110000050484
- Settlements: 34
- Cities: 1
- Villages: 33
- Website: rudkivska-gromada.gov.ua

Rudky urban hromada (Ukrainian: Рудківська міська громада) is a hromada in Ukraine, in Sambir Raion of Lviv Oblast. The administrative center is the city of Rudky.

== Settlements ==
The hromada consists of 1 city (Rudky) and 33 villages:

- Vankovychi
- Vyshnia
- Vistovychi
- Voshchantsi
- Dolobiv
- Zahiria
- Zahiria
- Zadnistriany
- Kanafosty
- Kolbaievychi
- Koniushky-Korolivski
- Koniushky-Tulyholivski
- Krukovets
- Kupnovychi
- Luky
- Malyniv
- Mykhailevychi
- Nyzhnie
- Nyklovychi
- Novyi Ostriv
- Novosilky-Hostynni
- Orkhovychi
- Ostriv
- Pidhaichyky
- Pohirtsi
- Podiltsi
- Rozdilne
- Susoliv
- Khlopchytsi
- Chaikovychi
- Chernykhiv
- Sheptychi
- Yaremkiv
