= Chernykhiv, Lviv Oblast =

Rural locality in Lviv Oblast, Ukraine

Chernykhiv Чернихів
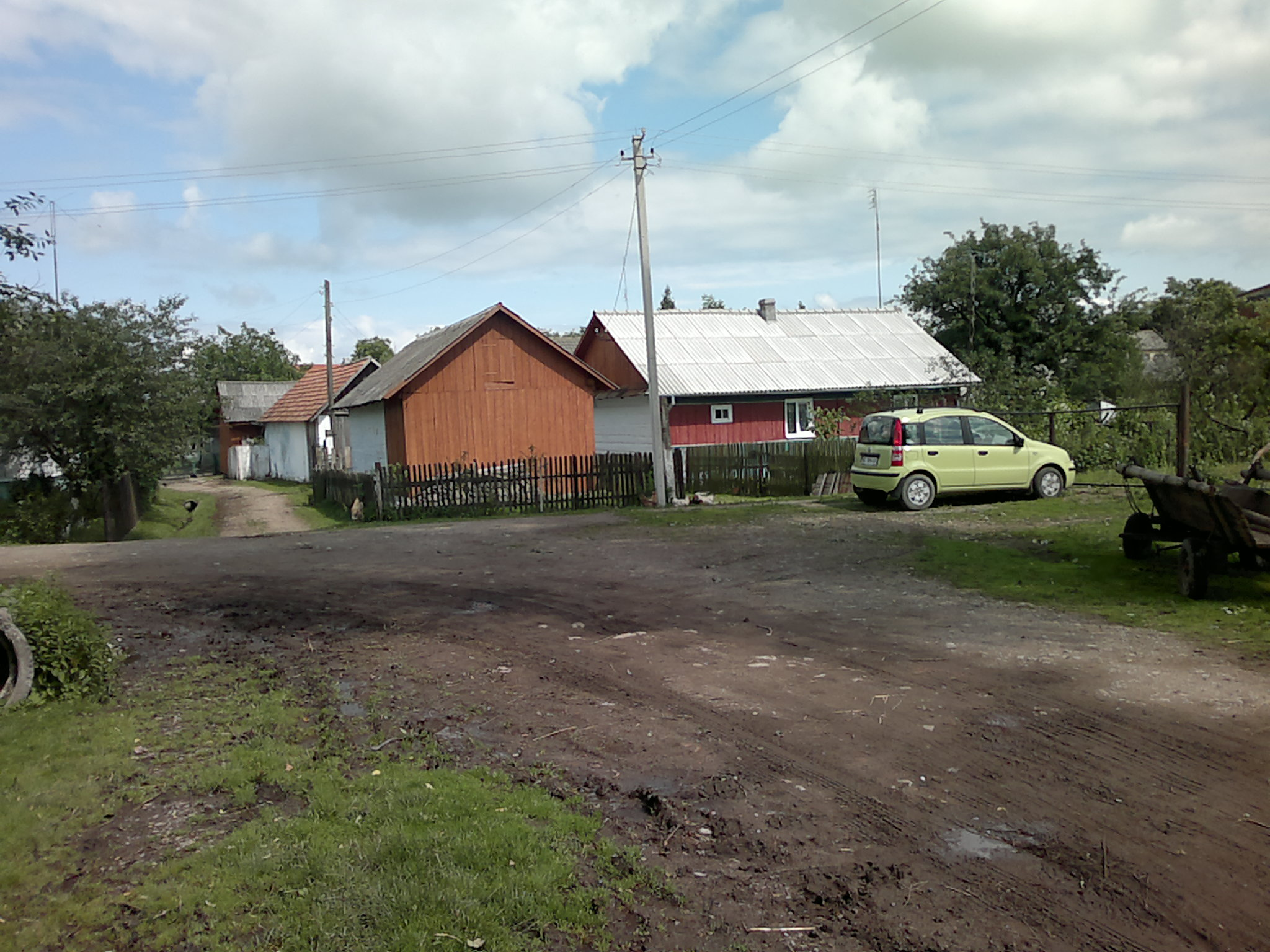

- Location in Lviv Oblast
- Coordinates: 49°36′35″N 23°20′16″E
- Country: Ukraine
- Oblast: Lviv Oblast
- Raion: Sambir Raion
- Elevation: 272 m (892 ft)

Population (2001)
  - Total: 447
- Time zone: UTC+2 (EET)
  - Summer (DST): UTC+3 (EEST)
- Postal code: 81435
- Area code: +380 3236

Chernykhiv (Ukrainian: Чернихів) is a village in Sambir Raion, Lviv Oblast (province) of western Ukraine. It belongs to of Rudky urban hromada, one of the hromadas of Ukraine.
