= Pidhaichyky, Sambir Raion, Lviv Oblast =

Pidhaichyky Підгайчики
- Village
- Location of Pidhaichyky in Lviv Oblast
- Coordinates: 49°38′51″N 23°30′45″E
- Country: Ukraine
- Oblast: Lviv Oblast
- District: Sambir Raion
- Hromada: Rudky urban hromada

Area
  - Total: 11.53 km^{2} (4.45 sq mi)
- Elevation: 282 m (925 ft)

Population (2001)
  - Total: 2,027
  - Density: 175.8/km^{2} (455.3/sq mi)
- Time zone: UTC+2 (EET)
  - Summer (DST): UTC+3 (EEST)
- Postal code: 80745
- Area code: +380 3265

Pidhaichyky (Ukrainian: Підгайчики) is a village (a selo) in the Sambir Raion (district) of Lviv Oblast in western Ukraine. It forms part of Rudky urban hromada, one of the hromadas of Ukraine.

== History ==
Pidhaichyky was first mentioned in writing in 1389 and initially belonged to the Polish-Lithuanian Commonwealth. In 1772, it was annexed by the Habsburg Empire, as part of Austrian Kingdom of Galicia and Lodomeria, via the Powiat Rudki. After the end of the World War I, Pidhaichyky was assigned to the Second Polish Republic (Lwów Voivodeship, Powiat Rudki, Gmina Hoszany). During World War II from September 1939 to June 1941, Pidhajtschyky was occupied by the Soviet Union and then by Germany until 1944, which incorporated the town into the General Government.

After the recapture by the Red Army in 1944 and the end of the war, Pidhaichyky was added to the Soviet Union, where it became part of the Ukrainian SSR and has been part of independent Ukraine since 1991.
