= Rudky =

City in Lviv Oblast, Ukraine

Rudky Рудки
- City
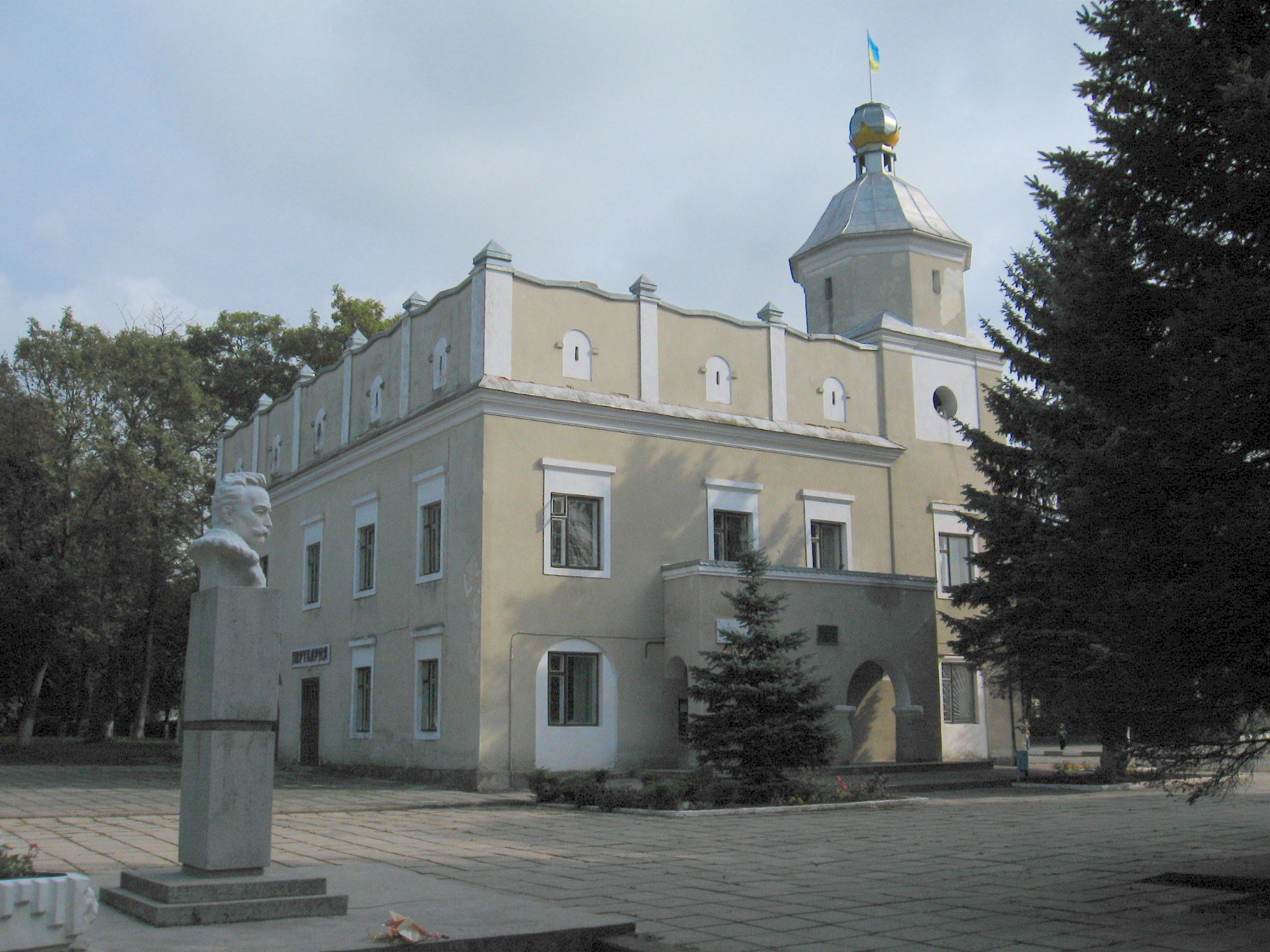
- Town hall

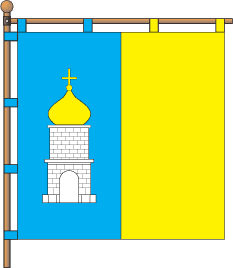
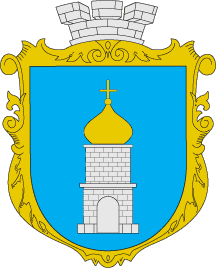
- Flag Coat of arms
- Interactive map of Rudky
- Location within Ukraine Location within Lviv Oblast
- Coordinates: 49°39′10″N 23°29′13″E
- Country: Ukraine
- Oblast: Lviv Oblast
- Raion: Sambir Raion
- Hromada: Rudky urban hromada
- Established: 1472

Area
  - Total: 3.8 km^{2} (1.5 sq mi)
- Elevation: 268 m (879 ft)

Population (2023)
  - Total: 5,118
  - Density: 385/km^{2} (1,000/sq mi)
- Time zone: UTC+2 (EET)
  - Summer (DST): UTC+3 (EEST)
- Postal code: 81440
- Area code: +380 3236
- Website: rudkivska-gromada.gov.ua (in Ukrainian)

Rudky (Ukrainian: Рудки, IPA: [ˈrudkɪ]; Polish: Rudki) is a city in Sambir Raion, Lviv Oblast in Ukraine. It hosts the administration of Rudky urban hromada, one of the hromadas of Ukraine. The population was 4,942 at the 2001 Ukrainian census. Current population: 5,230 (2022 estimate).

The town is the resting place of the Polish poet Aleksander Fredro, who was buried in a local Roman Catholic church in 1876. Rudky is on the Vyshnia river and is the home of the Vyshnia College of the Lviv National Agricultural University. Rudky Arboretum is on the southern edge of the town.

== Geography ==
Rudky is located along the Highway Ukraine ( H 13) – Lviv – Sambir – Uzhhorod at a distance 48 kilometres (30 mi) from the regional center Lviv, 26 kilometres (16 mi) from the district center Sambir, and 200 kilometres (120 mi) from Uzhhorod.
This is placed on the main European watershed, above the river Vyshnia (right tributary of the river San).

== History ==
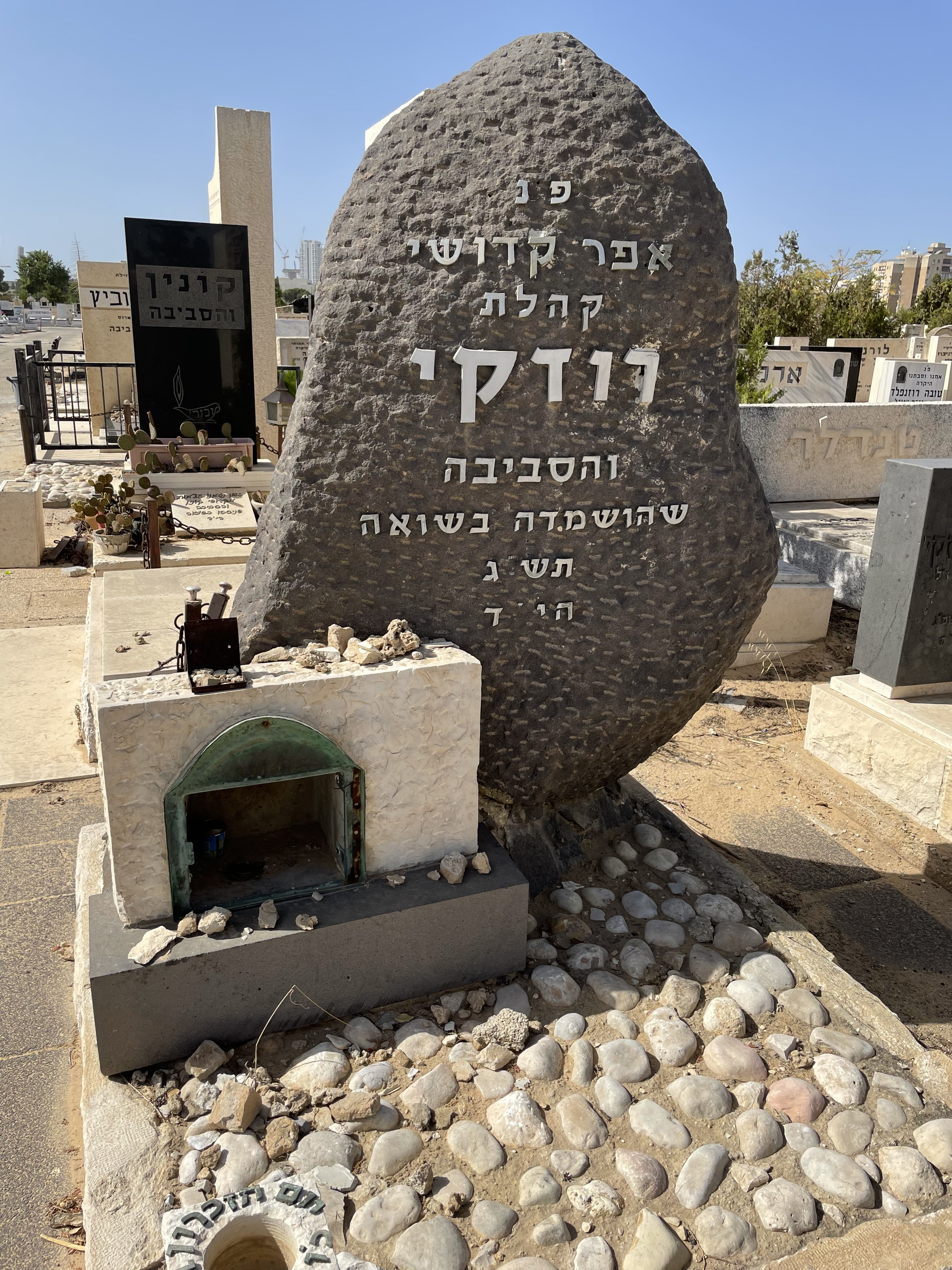
Rudky Holocaust memorial, Holon cemetery, Israel

Rudky (known in Polish as Rudki) was founded in the late 14th century in Kingdom of Poland, after Red Ruthenia was annexed by Poland. Its Roman Catholic parish was created in the early 15th century, and during the Protestant Reformation, the church was in 1550 turned into a Calvinist prayer house. In 1655, construction of a new church was initiated by the owner of the town, Andrzej Stano (Gozdawa coat of arms). Soon afterwards, the Swedish invasion of Poland brought widespread destruction to Rudki and its area, and the church was not completed until 1728. In 1742, Rudki was purchased by the Fredro family (Boncza coat of arms). Until the Partitions of Poland) Rudki belonged to Ruthenian Voivodeship. In 1772, it was annexed by the Habsburg Empire, as part of Austrian Galicia. After the Napoleonic Wars, Count Aleksander Fredro settled here. In 1880, the population of the town was 2582, with 1352 Jews and 945 Poles. In 1891, Polish scientist Mieczyslawa Ruxerowna was born here.

In 1918-1919, Rudki returned to Poland. In the Second Polish Republic, it was the seat of a county in Lwow Voivodeship, and until 1939, belonged to the Fredro family. At that time, the town had a population of 3,500, divided into Jewish, Polish and Ukrainian communities. Following the Invasion of Poland. Rudki was occupied by the Soviet Union, and its name was changed to Rudky. In June 1941, the NKVD murdered approximately 200 prisoners here (see NKVD prisoner massacres).

On June 27, 1941, the Germans occupied Rudki. In July, the Einsatzgruppen murdered 39 leaders of the Jewish community in the Berezina forest. On April 9, 1943, during the liquidation of the ghetto, Ukrainian policemen assisted German police and SD in executing about 1,700 Jews near the Brzezina forest and deporting about 300 Jews to the Janowska camp in Lviv.

On July 15, 2016, Archbishop Mieczyslaw Mokrzycki of the Roman Catholic Church dedicated the museum of Polish playwright and poet Aleksander Fredro, which was opened on the 140th anniversary of the death of the prominent Polish playwright in the bell tower of the Church of the Assumption of the Virgin Mary in Rudky (now the sanctuary of Our Lady of Rudky). The museum's exposition includes materials on the life and work of Aleksander Fredro, publications of his works, and theater posters from around the world.

== Cult constructions and religion ==
In the city various religions and cultures have co-existed. However, almost the entire Jewish community of around two thousand were murdered here during World War II with the help of some of the local population. A few other local farmers rescued and hid a few Jews at the risk of their own lives. The few survivors did not return to the community. At present there are Greek Catholic, the Orthodox and the Roman Catholic parishes. The city has a Church of the Nativity of the Blessed Virgin Mary, Church of the Holy Eucharist and Assumption of the Blessed Virgin Mary RC Church for the Christians.

Architectural monument of Sambir Raion is the Assumption of the Blessed Virgin Mary RC Church (1407/ 1). Alexander Fredro was buried in the family grave in the Catholic Church of the Assumption of city Rudky.

== Notable residents ==
- Stanisława Rachwałowa (1903–1985), member of the Polish resistance.

== Gallery ==
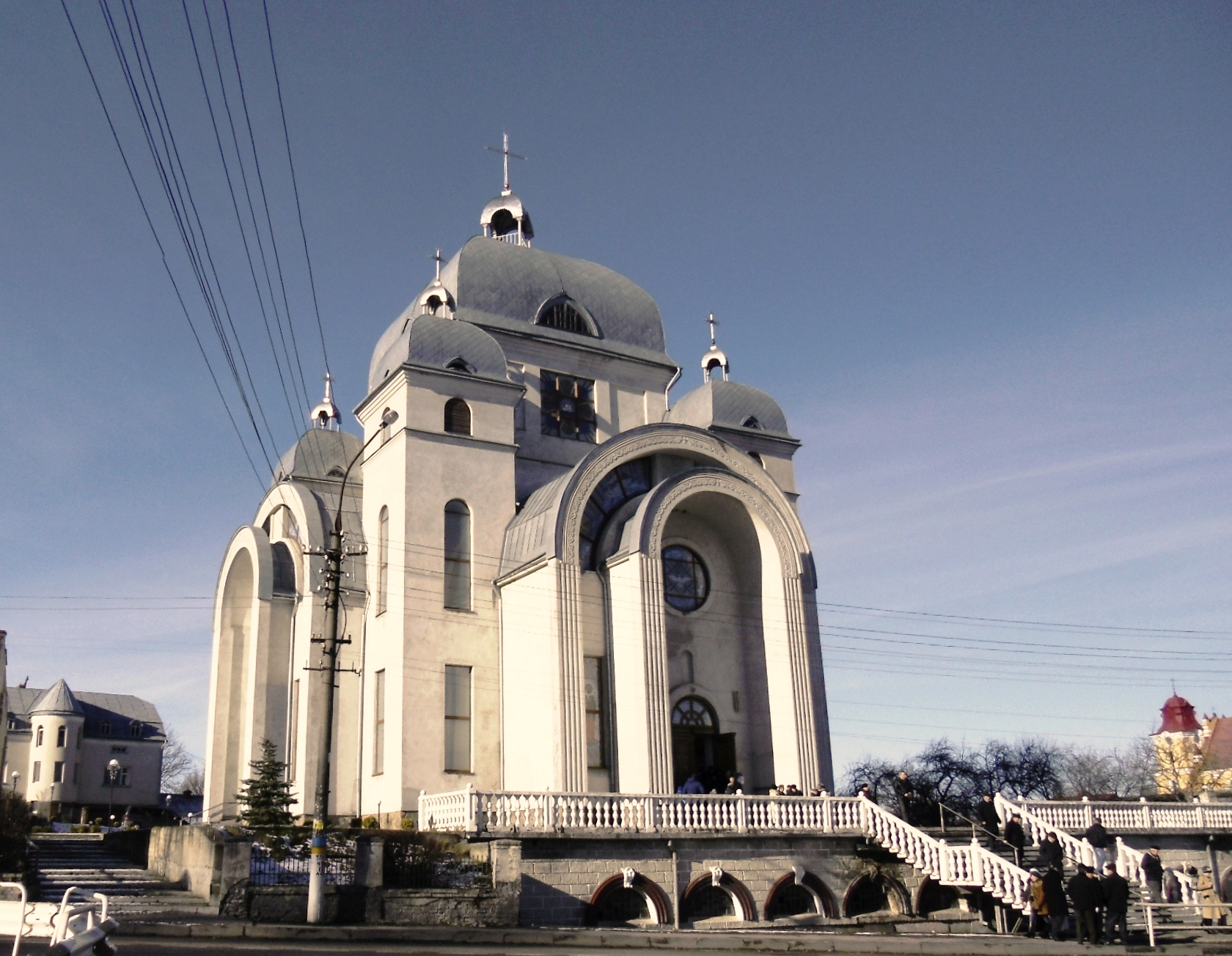
Church of the Holy Eucharist

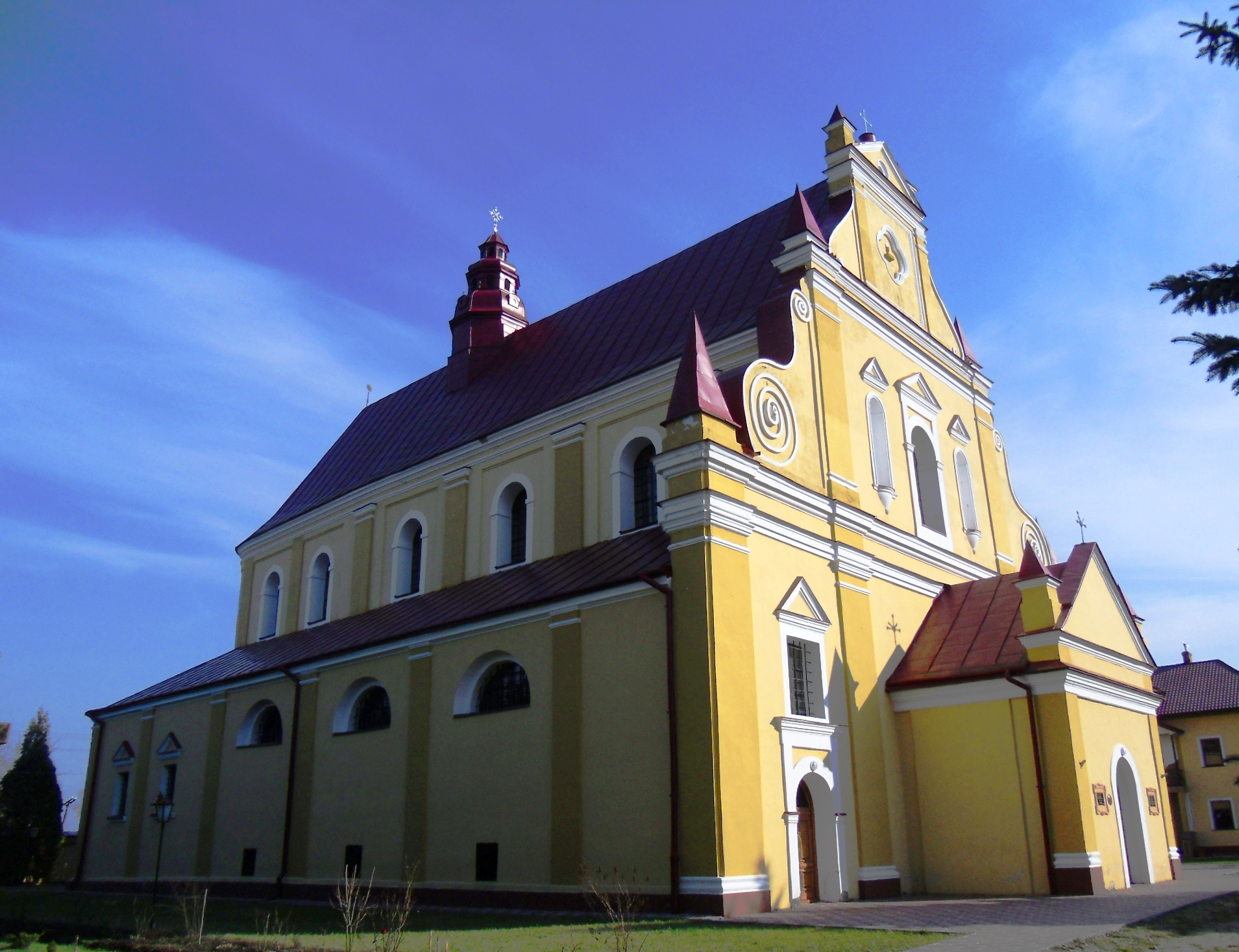
Assumption of the Blessed Virgin Mary RC Church

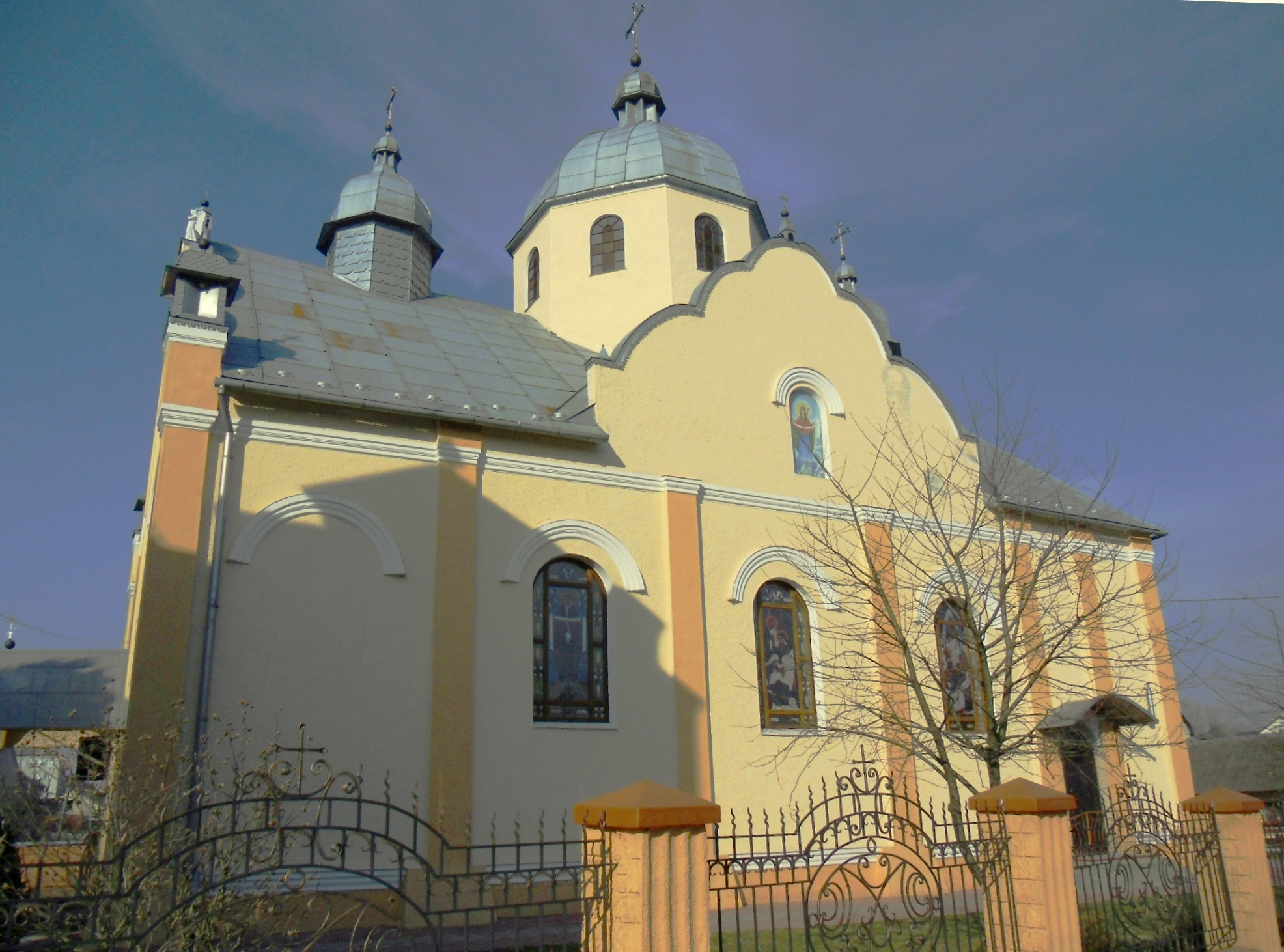
Church of the Nativity of the Blessed Virgin Mary.

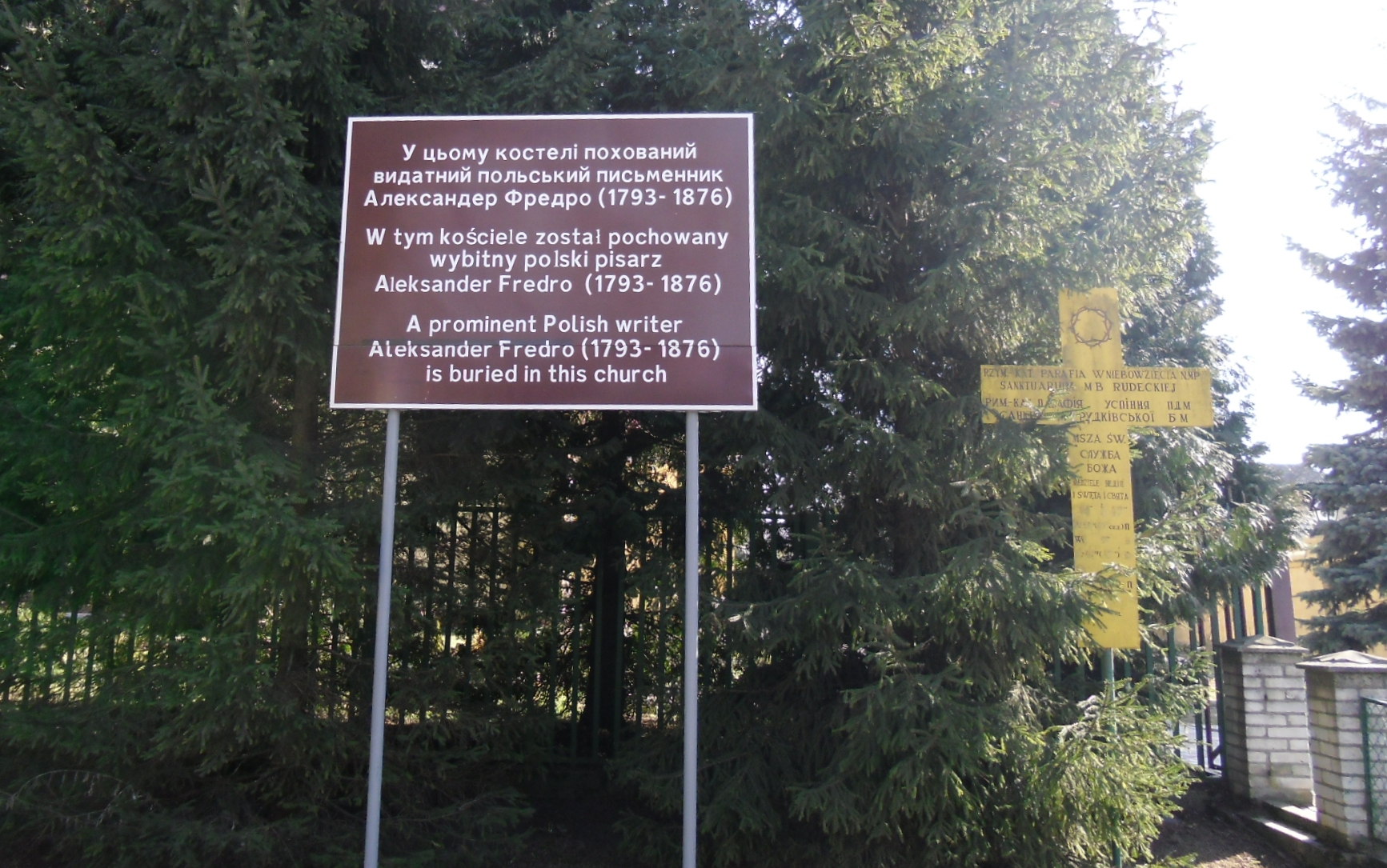
Memorial plaque to Alexander Fredro (1793-1876) at the Roman Catholic Church of the Assumption in the Rudky.
