= Vyshnia =

Vyshnia Ukrainian: Вишня
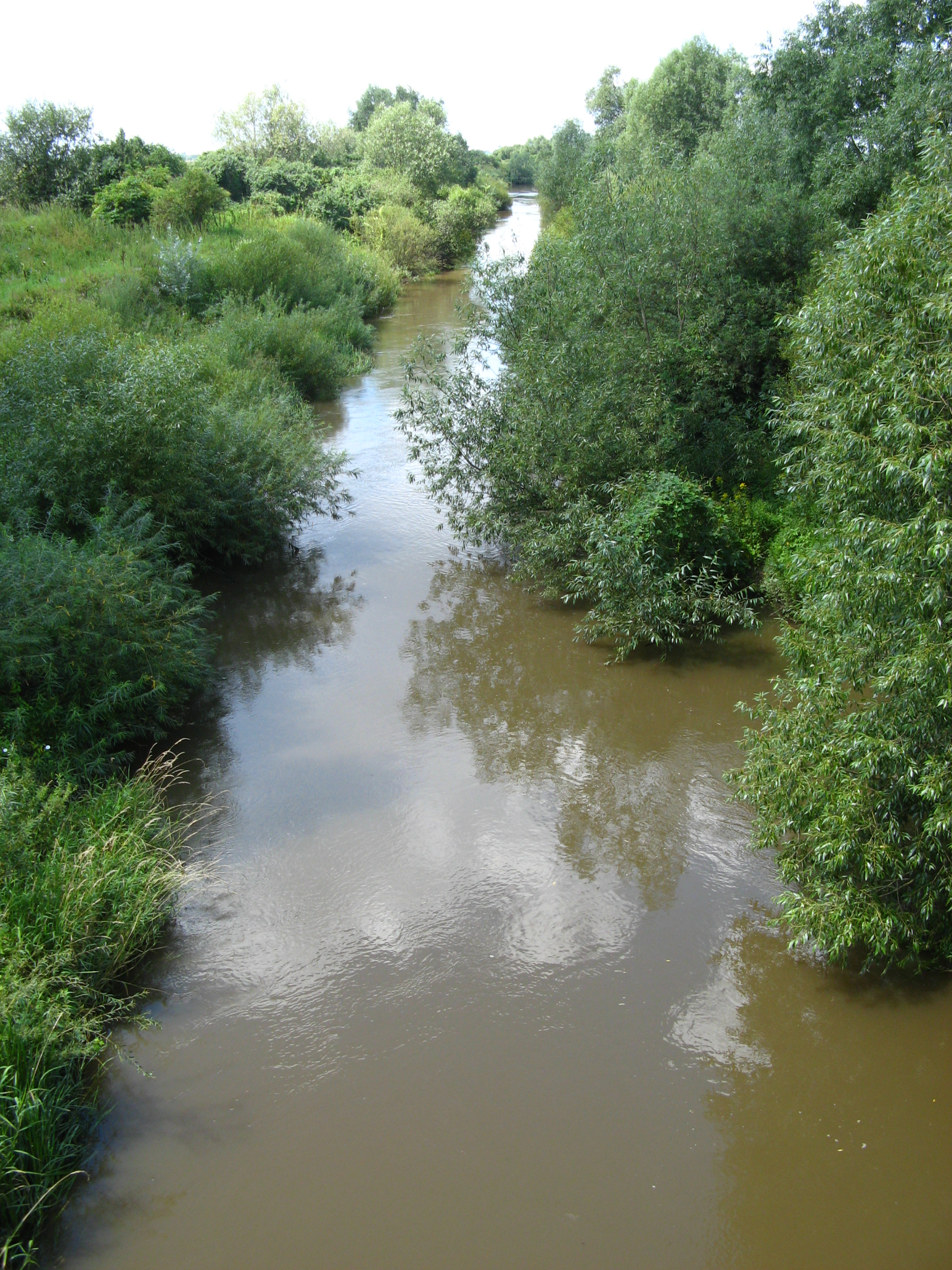
- Wisznia near Stubno

Location
- Country: Ukraine; Poland

Physical characteristics
- Source
  - location: southeast of Pidhaichyky, Lviv Oblast, Ukraine
  - coordinates: 49°36′54″N 23°32′17″E
  - elevation: 400 m (1,300 ft)
- Mouth: San
  - location: Michałówka, Podkarpackie Voivodeship, Poland
  - coordinates: 49°56′45″N 22°52′27″E
  - elevation: 189 m (620 ft)
- Length: 78 km (48 mi)
- Basin size: 1,220 km^{2} (470 mi^{2})

Basin features
- Progression: San→ Vistula→ Baltic Sea

Vyshnia or Wisznia (Ukrainian: Вишня) is a right tributary of the San River in southeastern Poland and western Ukraine.

== Description ==
It flows for 100 km (62 mi), 85 km (53 mi) of which flows through Ukraine. Just south of Rudky, Ukraine, near the village of Novosilky-Hostynni, the river reverses flow, with the southern extremity flowing into the Dniester.

The river falls into San near the city of Radymno.

== Tributaries ==
Left

- Vyshenka
- Sichnia
  - Troshchanka (left)
    - Shum (left)
  - Sikonytsia (right)
    - Chyzhivka (left)

Right

- Rakiv
  - Zamlynka (left)
  - Hlynets (right)
- Khorosnytsia
  - Huchok (right)
- Chornyi Potik (Black Stream)

== See also ==
- Rivers of Poland
- Walddeutsche
