= Bończa coat of arms =

Polish coat of arms

Bończa
- Battle cry: Bończa, Genorozecz, Jednorożec
- Alternative names: Bończe, Buńcza, Buńcze, Jednorożec, Rinocerus, Unicornus
- Earliest mention: 14th century
- Families: 212 names Babinowski, Babiński, Badeni, Badowski, Baniewicz, Bańkowski, Barszczewski, Bartoszewski, Bartoszyński, Bartynowski, Barwikowski, Bernat, Białobrzeski, Bieroński, Biniewicz, Bochdan, Bogdziewicz, Boguniewski, Bohdan, Bohdanowicz, Bohdewicz, Bojarski, Bonecki, Bonicki, Boniecki, Bonkiewicz, Bońko, Borodzic, Borodzicz, Braciejewski, Braciejowski, Brozicki, Brujewicz, Brzeski, Brzostowski, Brzyski, Bukowski, Burkovskiy, Bukszewski, Burnecki, Buza, Bystrzycki, Chalecki, Charchowski, Charlęski, Chilarski, Chmielecki, Chobotkowski, Chodnowski, Chodosowski, Chomętowski, Chrapek, Chrościchowski, Chrościechowski, Chrościejowski, Chrościkowski, Chruścikowski, Chyliński, Cichosz, Czyżykowski, Dalanowski, Domagalski, Dryliński, Dygulski, Fink, Fox, Franceson, Fredro, Gaczkowski, Gasparski, Gawski, Godkowski, Godlewski, Godzimierski, Golian, Gołaszewski, Gottartowski, Gozimirski, Grochowski, Gulbiński, Guliński, Iżycki, Jabłoński, Jacimierski, Jacimirski, Jodłowski, Kargowski, Kierski, Klonowski, Kłoda, Krajow, Krakowiecki, Kraków, Krzeski, Krzewski, Kulwiński, Kułacki, Kunicki, Linczowski, Lisowski, Lissowski, Lubecki, Lubkowski, Łokuciejewski, Łokuciewski, Łubkowski, Łubkowski Buża, Markowicz, Markowski, Miaskowski, Mieczkowski, Mierzb, Mikułowski, Milewski, Modzelewski, Moraniecki, Nagórny, Niebrzegowski, Niedabylski, Niedobylski (Nedobylsky), Olenikow, Olfinier, Osmolski, Osmołowski, Osmólski, Osmulski, Ottenhausen, Ozdowski, Parchwic, Parznicki, Pawulski, Pencuła, Pieczyński, Pióro, Płończyk, Pokrzywnicki, Postrucki, Postruski, Postruski, Prachwicz, Prawidlnicki, Przywiński, Radawiecki, Ratowt, Romanczenko, Romanowski, Rudziewicki, Ruszkowski, Rutkowski, Rybczewski, Rybczowski, Sienicki, Skaczewski, Skarzyński, Skarżyński, Skoczewski, Skokowski, Skorowski, Skronowski, Skrzydlewski, Skrzynecki, Skwarski, Socha, Solikowski, Srzebiecki, Stępiński, Stogniew, Strzebiecki, Strzebieliński, Strzelbicki, Strzeszkowski, Swaraczewski, Szablowski, Szabłowski, Szarewicz, Szerszeński, Szerzeński, Szerzyński, Szuszkowski, Szyskowski, Szyszyłowicz, Śmietanka, Tabiszewski, Tomaszewski, Tomaszowski, Tomaszowski, Toroszowski, Trebecki, Trębecki, Troszczel, Trościel, Truszkowski, Turno, Turobojski, Turoboyski, Uszdowski, Uzdowski, Waśniewski, Waśnioski, Wąsocki, Wąsoski, Wielgowic, Wilga, Wilgierd, Wyspiański, Zachert, Zawerski, Zdrojkowski, Zdroykowski, Zimnoch, Zrebiecki, Zrzebiecki, Źrebiecki, Żółkiewski, Żrebiecki

Bończa is a Polish coat of arms.

== Notable bearers ==
Notable bearers of this coat of arms include:

- House of Badeni
- Stanisław Chomętowski
- Stefan Chmielecki
- House of Fredro
  - Aleksander Fredro
- Józef Ignacy Dyga Polish National Army, victim of Russian massacre at Katyń
- Stanisław Jakub Skarżyński Group Captain Polish Air Force, record holder transatlantic flight 1933
- Ambroży Mikołaj Skarżyński Baron, General, Chief of Napoleon's Imperial Guard squadron (Polish 1st Light Cavalry Regiment of the Imperial Guard).
- Skarzynski

== Related coat of arms ==
- Chłędowski coat of arms
- Fredro Hrabia coat of arms

== Gallery ==
Counts Fredro

Counts Badeni (1887)

Counts Badeni

== See also ==
- Polish heraldry
- Heraldic family
- List of coats of arms of Polish nobility

== Bibliography ==
- Tadeusz Gajl: Herbarz polski od średniowiecza do XX wieku : ponad 4500 herbów szlacheckich 37 tysięcy nazwisk 55 tysięcy rodów. L&L, 2007. ISBN 978-83-60597-10-1.
- Sławomir Górzyński: Arystokracja polska w Galicji: studium heraldyczno-genealogiczne. Warszawa: DiG, 2009, s. 85-87. ISBN 978-83-7181-597-3.
