= Lavriv =

Village in Lviv Oblast, Ukraine

Lavriv Лаврів
- Village
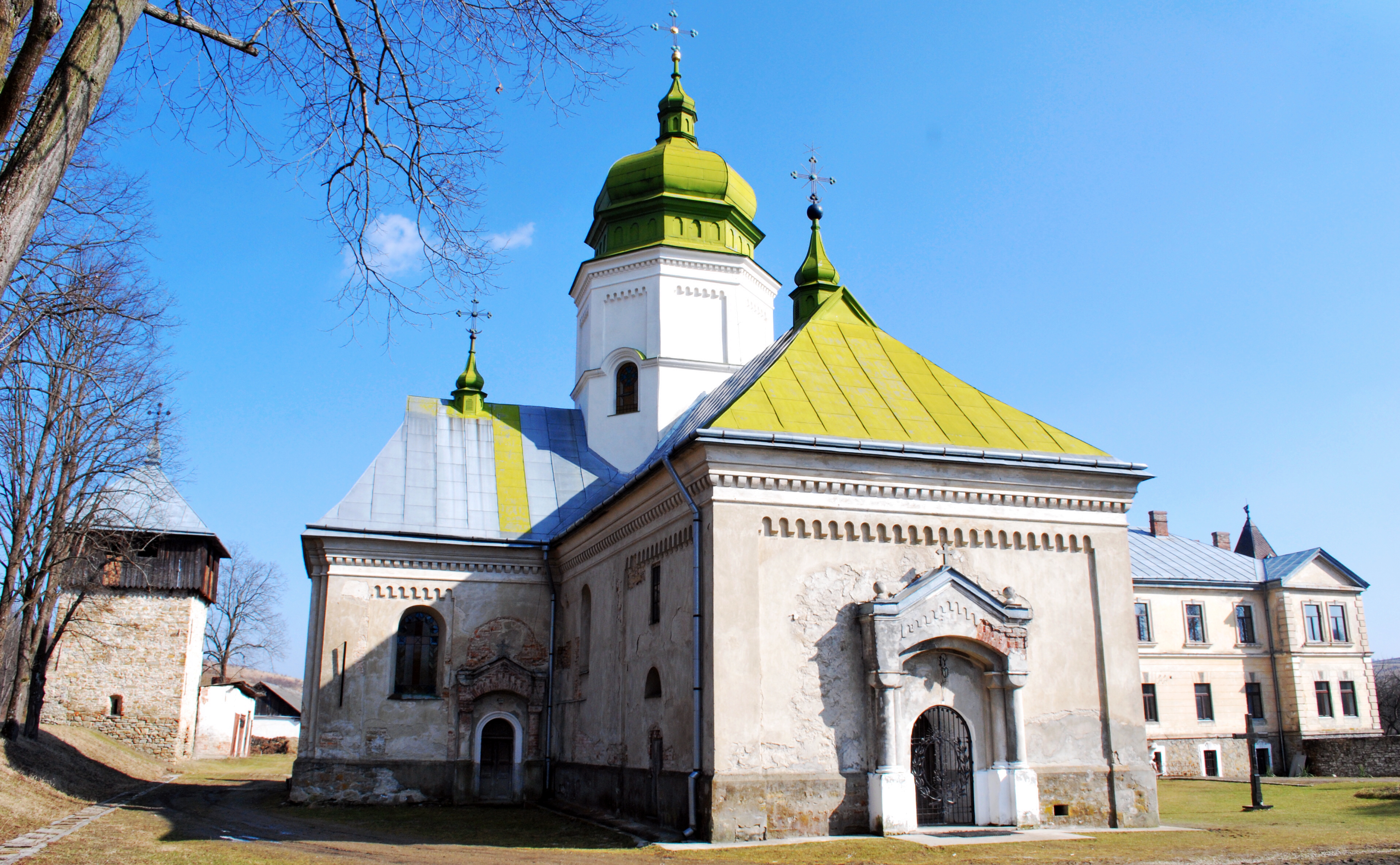
- Lavriv Monastery

- Location within Lviv Oblast
- Coordinates: 49°23′23″N 22°52′20″E
- Country: Ukraine
- Oblast: Lviv Oblast
- Raion: Sambir Raion
- Hromada: Staryi Sambir urban hromada
- Established: 1291

Area
  - Total: 342 km^{2} (132 sq mi)
- Elevation /(average value of): 507 m (1,663 ft)

Population (2001)
  - Total: 461
  - Density: 1,348/km^{2} (3,490/sq mi)
- Time zone: UTC+2 (EET)
  - Summer (DST): UTC+3 (EEST)
- Postal code: 82076
- Area code: +380 3238
- Website: село Лаврів^{(Ukrainian)}

Lavriv (Ukrainian: Лаврів) is a small village in Sambir Raion (district), Lviv Oblast (province) of Ukraine. It belongs to Staryi Sambir urban hromada, one of the hromadas of Ukraine. The population of the village is just ▼433 people. Its local government was administered by Velyka Linyna Village Council prior to the 2020 administrative reform.

== Geography ==
The village is located in the foothills of the Carpathians terrain of the Staryi Sambir Raion. The nearest railway station is in the village Tershiv (9 kilometres (5.6 mi)). The village is located near the road Highway H13 (Ukraine) ( H 13) from Lviv – Sambir to Uzhhorod. Distance from the regional center Lviv is 106 kilometres (66 mi) , 14 kilometres (8.7 mi) from the district center Staryi Sambir, and 205 kilometres (127 mi) from Uzhhorod.

== History and attractions ==
The first record of the village dates back to 1291 year. According to legend, in the village was buried Knyaz Leo I of Galicia (ca. 1228 – ca. 1301) became in turn Knyaz of Belz (1245–1264), Knyaz of Peremyshl, Knyaz of Halych (1264–1269) and Grand Prince of Kiev (1271–1301).

Until 18 July 2020, Bilychi belonged to Staryi Sambir Raion. The raion was abolished in July 2020 as part of the administrative reform of Ukraine, which reduced the number of raions of Lviv Oblast to seven. The area of Staryi Sambir Raion was merged into Sambir Raion.

Lavriv St. Onuphrius Monastery was founded in the middle of the 13th century in the village of Lavriv.

== Literature ==
- Історія міст і сіл УРСР : Львівська область, Велика Лінина. – К. : ГРУРЕ, 1968 р. Page 782 (in Ukrainian)
