= Spas, Sambir Raion, Lviv Oblast =

Village in Lviv Oblast, Ukraine

Spas Спас
- Village
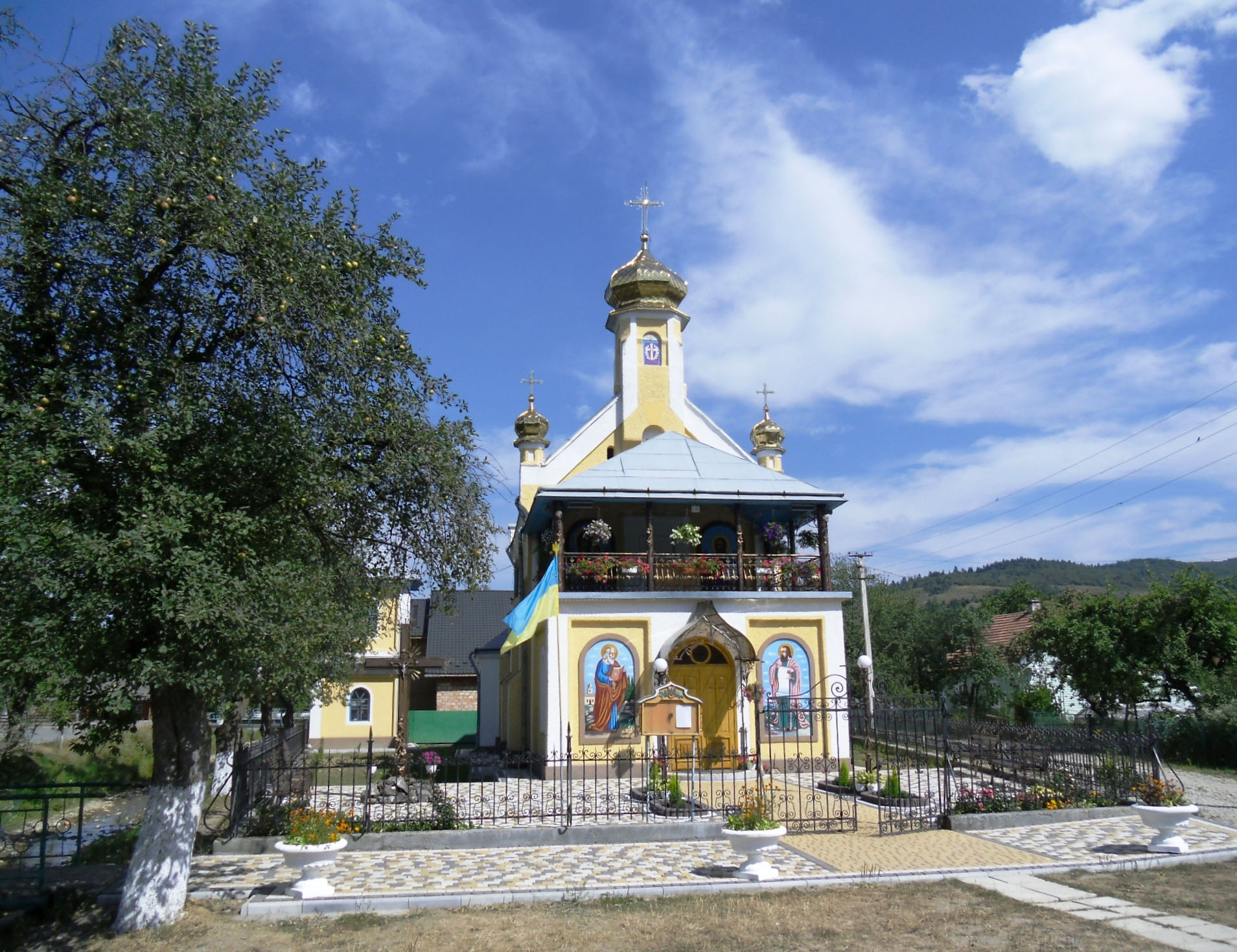
- Church of Saints Peter and Paul.

- Location within Lviv Oblast
- Coordinates: 49°23′37″N 22°58′04″E
- Country: Ukraine
- Oblast: Lviv Oblast
- District: Sambir Raion
- Established: 1295

Area
  - Total: 062 km^{2} (24 sq mi)
- Elevation /(average value of): 373 m (1,224 ft)

Population (2020)
  - Total: ▼436
  - Density: 79,516/km^{2} (205,950/sq mi)
- Time zone: UTC+2 (EET)
  - Summer (DST): UTC+3 (EEST)
- Postal code: 82073
- Area code: +380 3238
- Website: село Спас ^{(Ukrainian)}

Spas (Ukrainian: Спас, Polish: Spas) is a village (selo) in Sambir Raion, Lviv Oblast, of Western Ukraine. It belongs to Staryi Sambir urban hromada, one of the hromadas of Ukraine. The total area of the village is 0.62 km^{2}, and the population is around 440 people. The local government is administered by the Tershivska village council.

== Geography ==
The village is located in the mountainous terrain of the Staryi Sambir Raion along the left (west) bank of the Dniester River. This area is also known as the Carpathian Foothills. The village is located 6 kilometres (3.7 mi) from the district center of Staryi Sambir along Highway H13, which runs from Lviv–Sambir to Uzhhorod. The village is situated 99 kilometres (62 mi) from the regional center Lviv and 194 kilometres (121 mi) from the Ukrainian city of Uzhhorod.

== History and attractions ==
The village is known to have existed since at least the year 1295. In 1301, Knyaz Leo I of Galicia (ca. 1228 – ca. 1301) died in the town.

Until 18 July 2020, Spas belonged to Staryi Sambir Raion. The raion was abolished in July 2020 as part of the administrative reform of Ukraine, which reduced the number of raions of Lviv Oblast to seven. The area of Staryi Sambir Raion was merged into Sambir Raion.

A few kilometers south of the village is a geological landmark called the Spassky Stone.

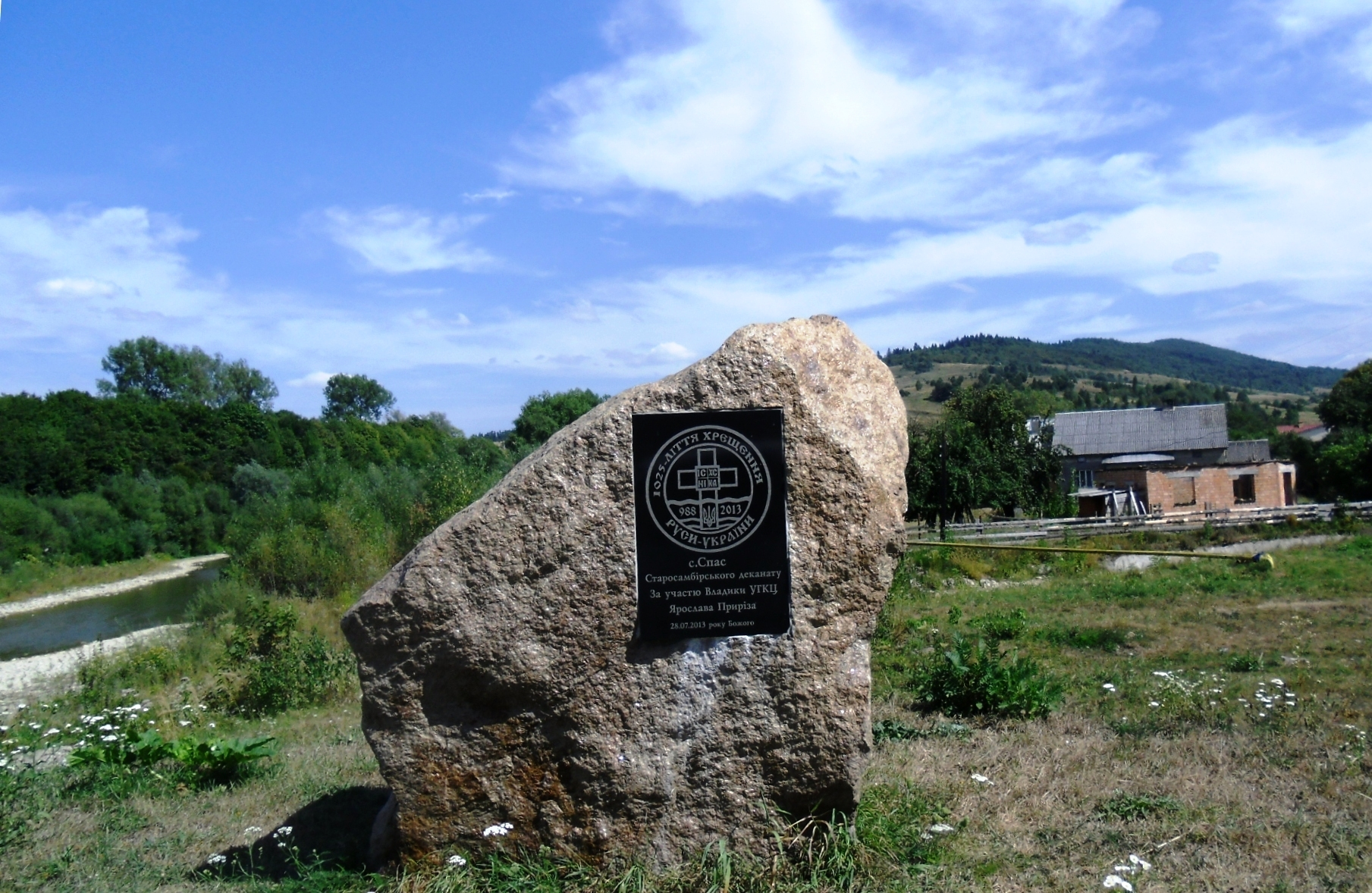
Memorable stone in honor of the 1025th anniversary of the baptism of RUS

On July 28, 2013 a commemorative stone and memorable tablet was created and consecrated in the village of Spas to commemorate the 1025th anniversary of the baptism of Kievan Rus.

== Literature ==
- Історія міст і сіл УРСР : Львівська область, Тершів. – К. : ГРУРЕ, 1968 р. Page 787 (in Ukrainian)
