= Hutsulka Ksenya (song) =

Ukrainian Folk Song

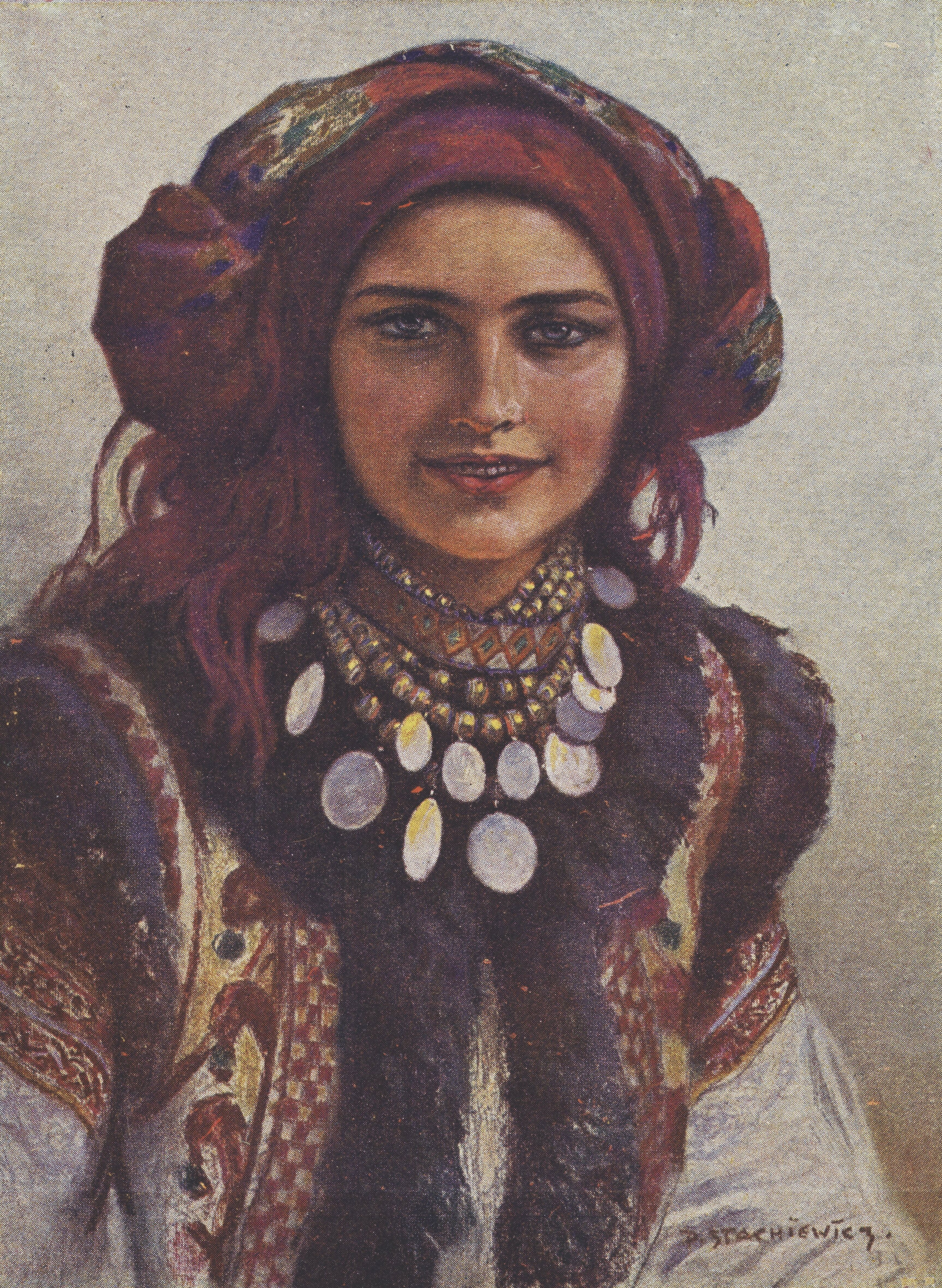

Song
- Released: 1932
- Genre: Folk/Tango
- Composer: Ivan Nedilsky (disputed)
- Lyricist: Roman Savitsky or Yaroslav Barnych (disputed)

An a cappella performance of Hutsulka Ksenia

Hutsulka Ksenya (Also spelled: Hutzulka Ksenya or Hutsulka Ksenia; Ukrainian: Гуцулка Ксеня, pronounced [ɦʊˈt͡suɫkɐ ˈksɛnʲɐ]) is a Ukrainian folk-tango song that originated in the 1930s. Its authorship remains a subject of debate. The lyrics are often attributed to Roman Savitsky, a teacher from the village of Bachyna, while the music is frequently credited to Ivan Nedilsky, a composer and conductor from the village of Zolotyi Potik. Some sources, however, attribute both the lyrics and music to Yaroslav Barnych, a composer and conductor from Balyntsi, who later adapted the song into a popular operetta.

The song tells the story of a young Hutsul woman named Ksenya, admired for her beauty and vitality. Set in the Carpathian Mountains, the song reflects themes of love, admiration, and regional identity, while celebrating the traditions and spirit of Hutsul culture and life in the Ukrainian highlands.

== Background ==
There are two main accounts regarding the origins of this song

=== Version One ===
According to this version, the composer of the song is Yaroslav Barnych, a Ukrainian conductor, teacher, and public figure. His niece, Olena Verhanovska, recalled that Barnych often visited their home in Kolomyia while traveling from Stanislaviv (now Ivano-Frankivsk), and that he worked on the song there. This account is also supported by some of Barnych's students and contemporaries.

The inspiration for the character Ksenya is believed to have been Ksenya Klinovska from Nebyliv, a village in the Rozhniativ district. She reportedly studied in Stanislaviv and is said to have inspired Barnych. However, there is limited documentary evidence to verify these details.

In 1938, Barnych composed the operetta "Hutsulka Ksenya", which includes the song.

=== Version Two ===
Another account credits the song to Roman Savitsky, a teacher from the village of Bachyna in the Lviv region. Although he did not have formal musical training, Savitsky was involved in local musical activities in Stanislaviv.

He is said to have written the lyrics during a summer visit to the village of Sheshory, where he stayed with relatives. His cousin's daughter, Ksenia, participated in a local celebration and jokingly asked him to write a song for her. According to this version, Savitsky wrote the lyrics, and they were later set to music by Ivan Nedilsky.

Barnych later incorporated elements of the song into his 1938 operetta "Hutsulka Ksenya".

== Cultural Impact ==
The song, until then little known outside of Galicia, was frequently broadcast by the German-controlled radio in occupied Kyiv during World War II.

Hutsulka Ksenya continues to be relevant in Ukraine's culture today. The song is often performed at cultural events and folk festivals, and is regularly featured in various Ukrainian music programs. Additionally in 2019, a film adaptation of Barnych's operetta based on the song was created.
