= Staryi Sambir urban hromada =

Hromada in Lviv Oblast, Ukraine

Staryi Sambir urban hromada Старосамбірська міська громада
- Hromada
- Seal
- Interactive map of Staryi Sambir urban hromada
- Country: Ukraine
- Oblast: Lviv Oblast
- Raion: Sambir Raion
- Admin. center: Staryi Sambir

Area
  - Total: 3,358 km^{2} (1,297 sq mi)

Population (2021)
  - Total: 21,173
  - Density: 6.305/km^{2} (16.33/sq mi)
- CATOTTG code: UA46080150000050321
- Settlements: 26
- Cities: 1
- Rural settlements: 1
- Villages: 24
- Website: sts-gromada.gov.ua

Staryi Sambir urban hromada (Ukrainian: Старосамбірська міська громада) is a hromada in Ukraine, in Sambir Raion of Lviv Oblast. The administrative center is the city of Staryi Sambir.

== Settlements ==
The hromada consists of 1 city (Staryi Sambir), 1 rural settlement (Stara Sil) and 24 villages:

- Bachyna
- Bilychi
- Velyka Linyna
- Velykosillia
- Voloshynovo
- Volia
- Zavadka
- Koblo
- Lavriv
- Morozovychi
- Potik
- Rosokhy
- Sozan
- Sosnivka
- Spas
- Stara Ropa
- Strashevychi
- Strilbychi
- Sushytsia
- Tvari
- Tershiv
- Tykha
- Torhanovychi
- Torchynovychi
