= Rosokhy =

Rural locality in Lviv Oblast, Ukraine

Rosokhy Росохи
- Location in Lviv Oblast Rosokhy (Ukraine)
- Coordinates: 49°26′33″N 22°46′57″E
- Country: Ukraine
- Oblast: Lviv Oblast
- Raion: Sambir Raion
- Hromada: Staryi Sambir urban hromada
- Time zone: UTC+2 (EET)
  - Summer (DST): UTC+3 (EEST)
- Postal code: 82072

Rosokhy (Ukrainian: Росохи) is a village in the Staryi Sambir urban hromada of the Sambir Raion of Lviv Oblast in Ukraine.

== History ==
The first written mention of the village was in 16th century.

On 19 July 2020, as a result of the administrative-territorial reform and liquidation of the Staryi Sambir Raion, the village became part of the Sambir Raion.

== Religion ==
- Church of the Nativity of the Virgin Mary (15th–19th centuries)

== Bibliography ==
- "Rosochy (3)". Geographical Dictionary of the Kingdom of Poland (in Polish). 9. Warszawa: Kasa im. Józefa Mianowskiego. 1888. p. 765.
