= Church of the Nativity of the Virgin Mary, Rosokhy =

Ukrainian church in Rosokhy, Ukraine

Church of the Nativity of the Virgin Mary
- Церква Різдва Пресвятої Богородиці
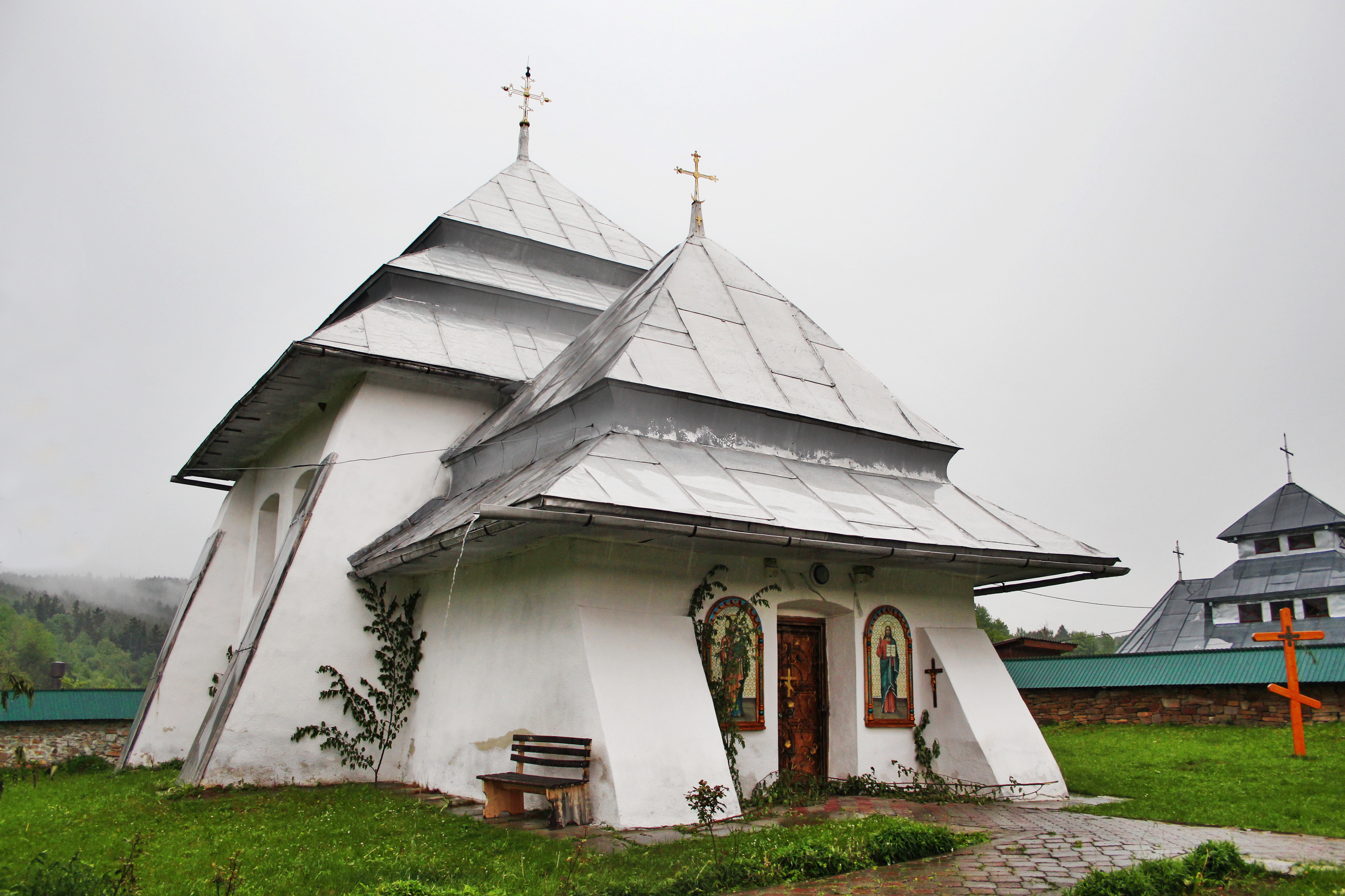

- Location within Lviv Oblast

Location
- Location: Rosokhy
- Interactive map of Church of the Nativity of the Virgin Mary
- Coordinates: 49°26′34″N 22°47′02″E

Architecture
- Completed: 15th–19th centuries

Immovable Monument of National Significance of Ukraine
- Official name: Церква Різдва Пресвятої Богородиці (Church of the Nativity of the Virgin Mary)
- Type: Architecture
- Reference no.: 130120/1

Church of the Nativity of the Virgin Mary (Ukrainian: Церква Різдва Пресвятої Богородиці) is a stone church, an architectural monument of national importance in Rosokhy, Sambir Raion, Lviv Oblast, Ukraine.

== History ==
At one time, the parish belonged to the Starosilskyi deanery. In 1926, a new brick church was built on the site of the old stone church. Until 1874, it functioned as a chapel, and later received parish status.

According to restoration expert Ivan Mohytych, the church was probably built in the 13th century (although most date it later). The building, located on a hill near the road, served a dual purpose: religious and defensive, serving as the main point of protection for residents during Tatar raids.

The temple is three-part, three-domed, built of broken stone on lime mortar. It consists of a nave, a narthex, and an apse. The massiveness and power of the structure are emphasized by sloping buttresses at the corners. An additional line of defense is created by a stone wall with rectangular loopholes surrounding the church grounds.

== Priests ==
- vacant position ([1828−1843], employee)
- Platon Denyshchak (1843–1844, employee)
- Antin Kroll (1845–1849, employee)
- Ivan Brittan (1849–1850, employee)
- Teofil Mentsinskyi (1850–1853, employee)
- Wincencij Chidajowski (1853–1872+, employee)
- Teofil Skobelski (1872–1874, employee)
- Józef Budzynowski (1874–1875, administrator; 1875–[1877])
- Vasyl Lebedynskyi (?–1879, administrator)
- Tymotei Dorosh (1879–1908+)
- Mykhailo Bula (1908–1921)
- Petro Maziar (1921–1927)
- Stefan Konkoliovskyi (1927–1929, administrator)
- Ivan Kits (1929–[1939])
