= Bachyna =

Village in Lviv Oblast, Ukraine

Bachyna Бачина
- Village
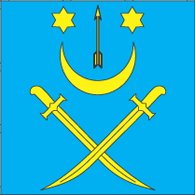
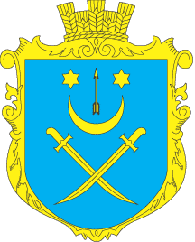
- Flag Coat of arms

- Location within Lviv Oblast
- Coordinates: 49°27′42″N 23°02′06″E
- Country: Ukraine
- Oblast: Lviv Oblast
- District: Sambir Raion
- Elevation /(average value of): 339 m (1,112 ft)

Population
  - Total: 366
  - Density: 1,679/km^{2} (4,350/sq mi)
- Time zone: UTC+2 (EET)
  - Summer (DST): UTC+3 (EEST)
- Postal code: 82080
- Area code: + 380 3238

Bachyna (Ukrainian: Бачина, Polish: Baczyna) is a village (selo) in Sambir Raion, Lviv Oblast, of Western Ukraine. It belongs to Staryi Sambir urban hromada, one of the hromadas of Ukraine.

Since 1905, the Uzhhorod - Sambir rail line runs through the village.

In 1921, the village numbered 301 inhabitants. During the Interwar period, when the settlement was part of the Lwów Voivodeship of the Second Polish Republic.

Until 18 July 2020, Bachyna belonged to Staryi Sambir Raion. The raion was abolished in July 2020 as part of the administrative reform of Ukraine, which reduced the number of raions of Lviv Oblast to seven. The area of Staryi Sambir Raion was merged into Sambir Raion.
