= Staryi Sambir =

City in Lviv Oblast, Ukraine

Staryi Sambir Старий Самбір
- City
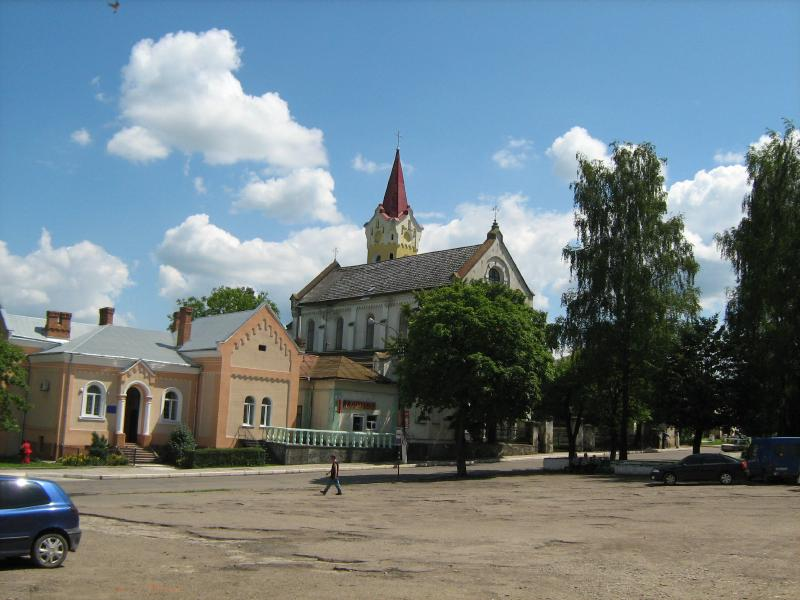
- Main square

- Flag Coat of arms
- Interactive map of Staryi Sambir
- Location within Lviv Oblast Location within Ukraine
- Coordinates: 49.443056°N 23.003333°E
- Country: Ukraine
- Oblast: Lviv Oblast
- Raion: Sambir Raion
- Hromada: Staryi Sambir urban hromada
- First mentioned: 1378

Population (2022)
  - Total: 6,440
- Time zone: UTC+2 (EET)
  - Summer (DST): UTC+3 (EEST)
- Website: sts-gromada.gov.ua.

Staryi Sambir (Ukrainian: Старий Самбір, IPA: [stɐˈrɪj ˈsɑmbir]; Polish: Stary Sambor, Staremiasto, Stare Miasto) is a city in Sambir Raion, Lviv Oblast of western Ukraine, close to the border with Poland. Staryi Sambir hosts the administration of Staryi Sambir urban hromada, one of the hromadas of Ukraine. Its population is approximately 6,440 (2022 estimate).

== History ==
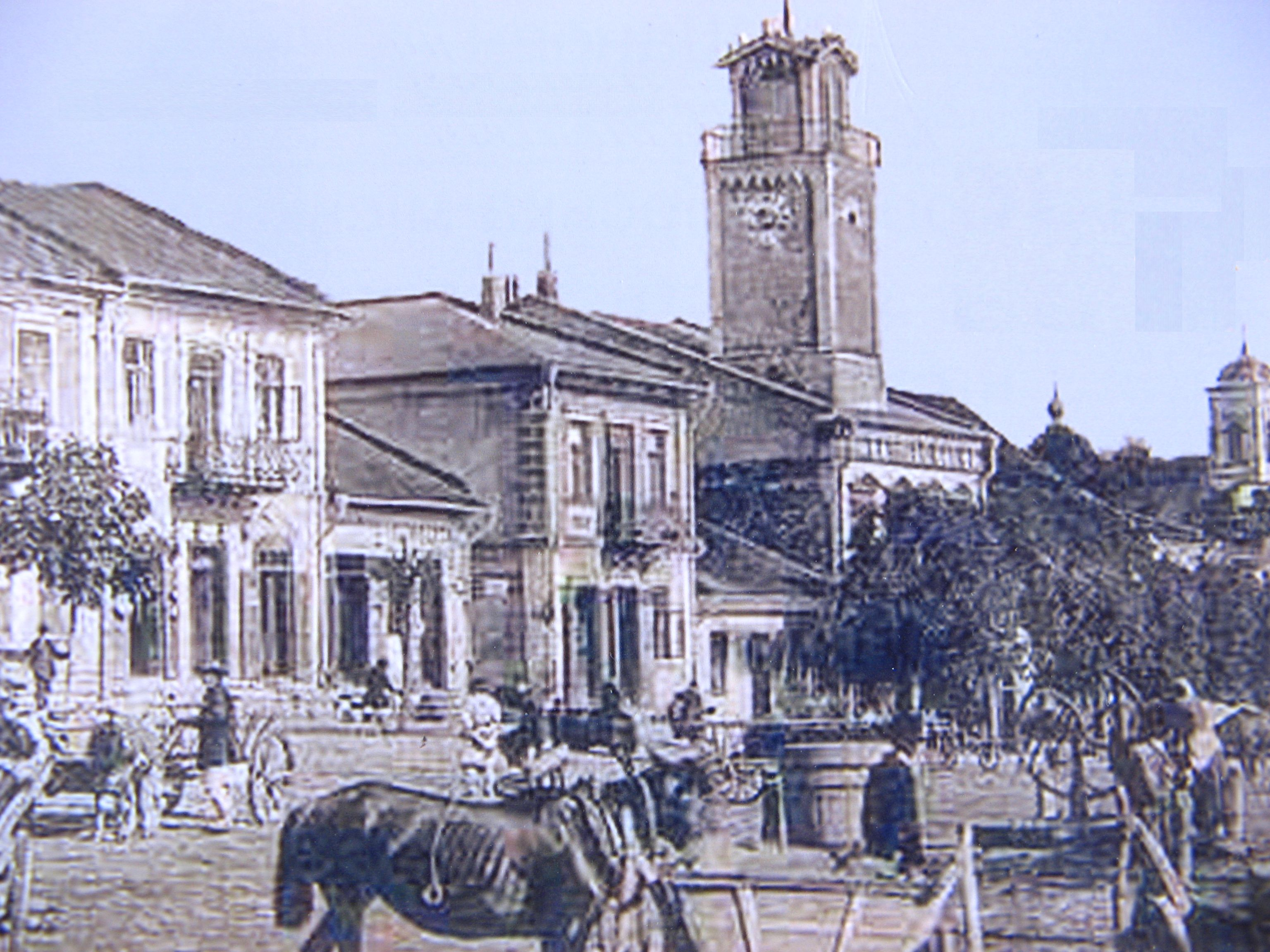
Market Square and the Town Hall, 1903

The exact date of establishment of the town is not known. Sambir, known in Polish as Sambor, was for the first time mentioned in documents in 1378. At that time, it was a private town of the noble Herburt family, part of Przemysl Land, Ruthenian Voivodeship, Kingdom of Poland. In 1501, a Roman Catholic church was opened here, and in 1553, Sambir received a town charter. In 1668, a town hall was built here, and in the early 18th century, the local church was remodelled. Until 1772 (see Partitions of Poland), Sambir belonged to Przemysl Land, Ruthenian Voivodeship. From 1772 until late 1918, Sambir belonged to Austrian Galicia. In 1880, its population was 3,482, with 1,399 Greek-Catholics, 704 Roman Catholics, and 1,377 Jews.

During the Polish-Ukrainian War, Sambir was seized by the Poles whose possession of the town was confirmed in the Peace of Riga. According to the 1921 census, the town had a population of 4,314, with 1,534 Jews. In the Second Polish Republic, it was the seat of a county in Lwow Voivodeship (until 1932). After the 1939 invasion of Poland, the town was annexed into the Soviet Union. Its Jewish residents were murdered in the Holocaust.

In the immediate postwar period, the remaining ethnic Poles were expelled. Most of them settled in the Recovered Territories. Ukrainians were resettled following Operation Vistula.

Until 18 July 2020, Staryi Sambir served as the administrative center of Staryi Sambir Raion. The raion was abolished in July 2020 as part of the administrative reform of Ukraine, which reduced the number of raions of Lviv Oblast to seven. The area of Staryi Sambir Raion was merged into Sambir Raion.

== Notable people ==
- Sebastian Engelberg (1899-1979), Polish-American singer and voice teacher
- Mikołaj Zyblikiewicz (1823–1887), Polish politician and lawyer
- Maria Jarema (1908–1958), Polish painter and sculptor
- Anda Meisels Rosen, Holocaust Survivor and author of "Middle Andzia"

== Gallery ==
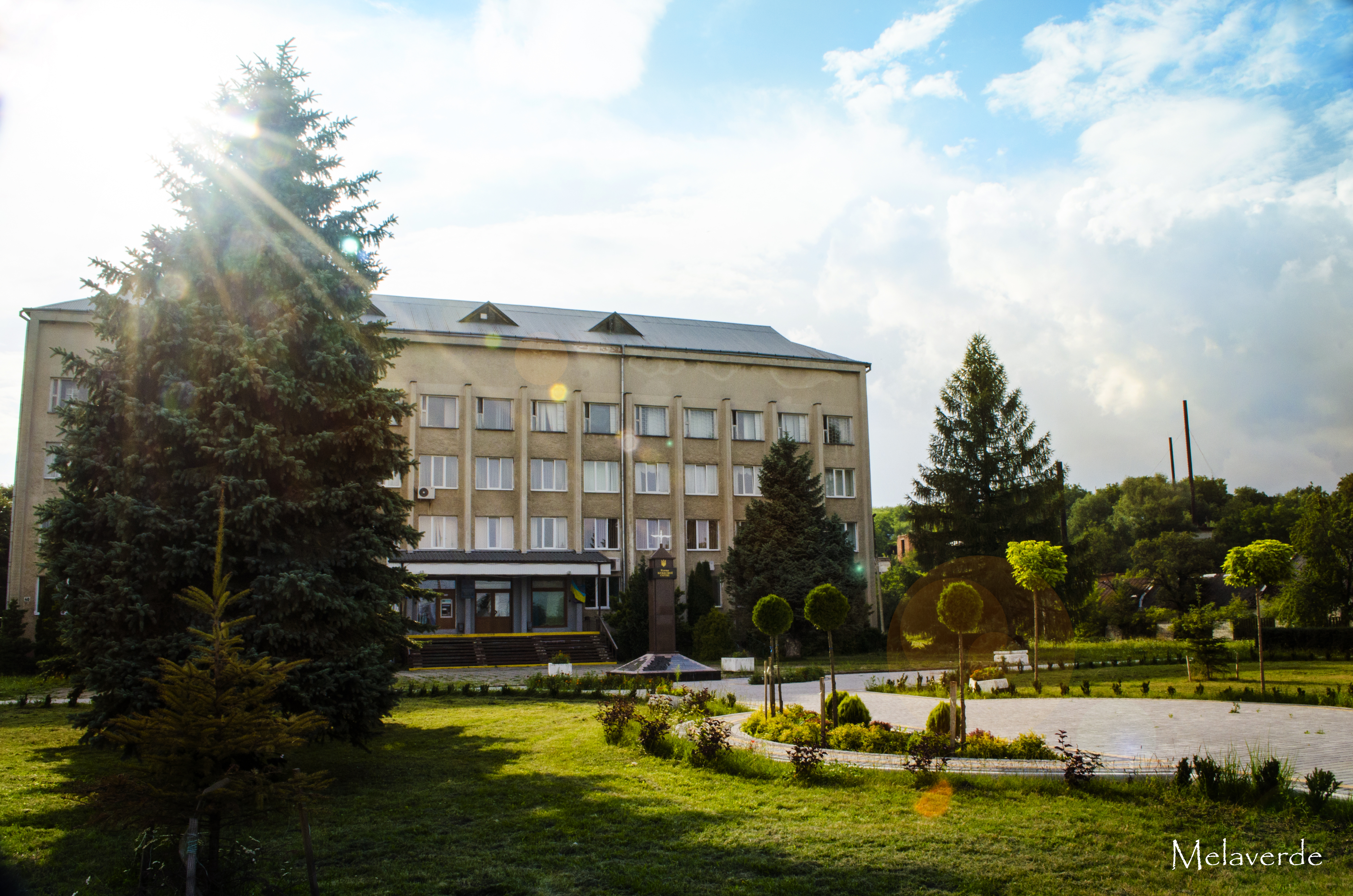
Local administration building

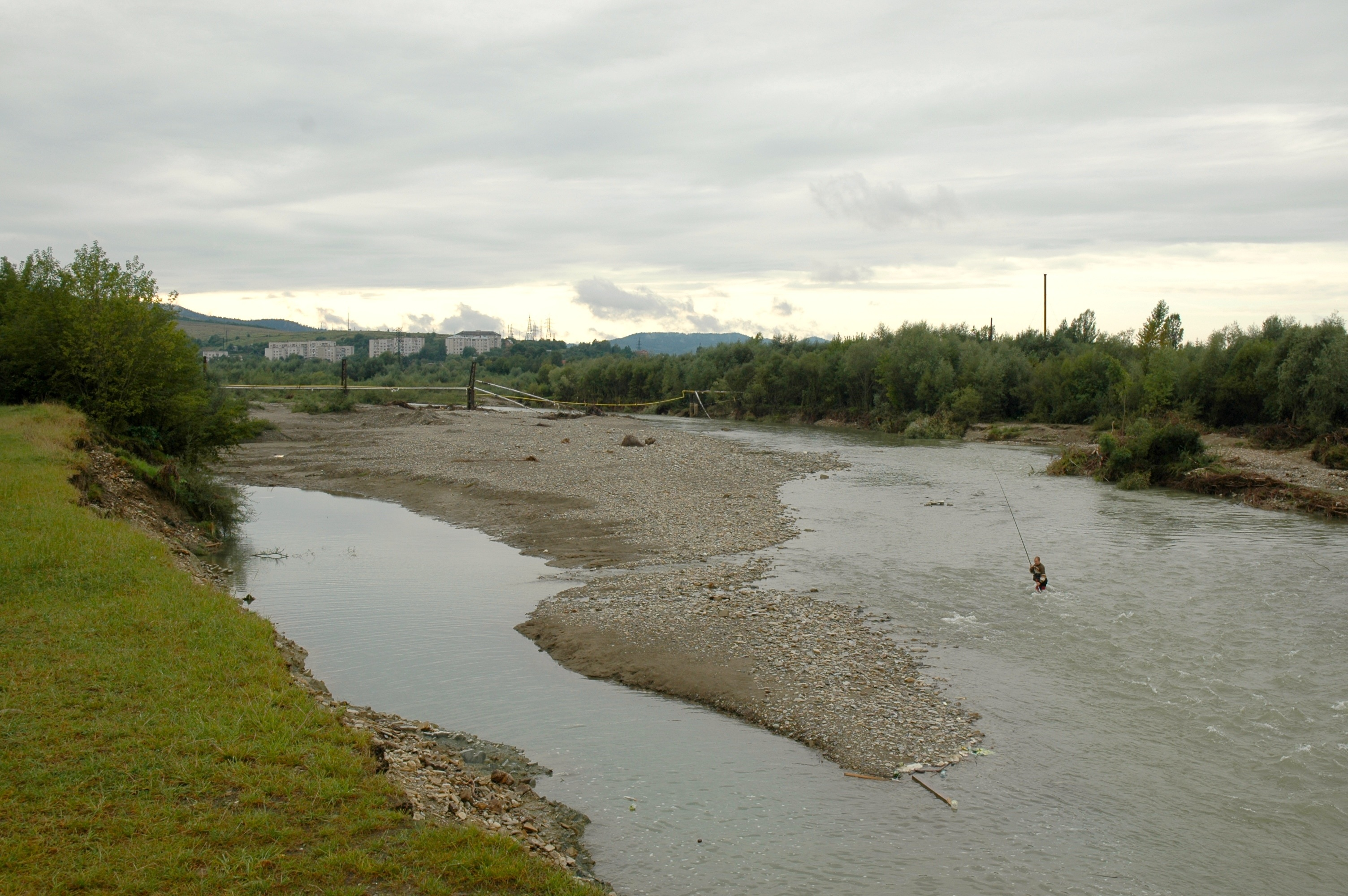
Dniester River near Staryi Sambir

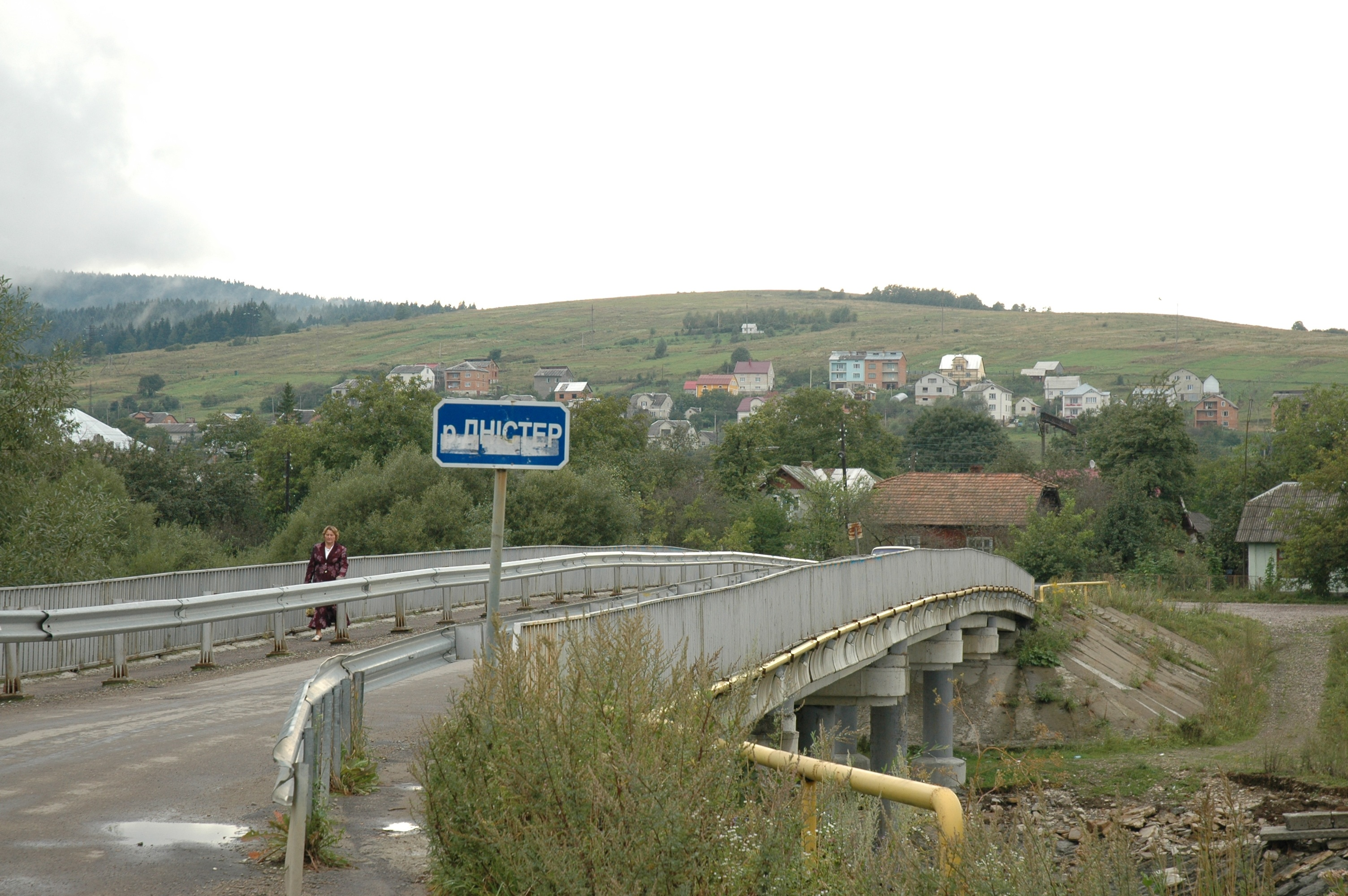
Dniester River bridge

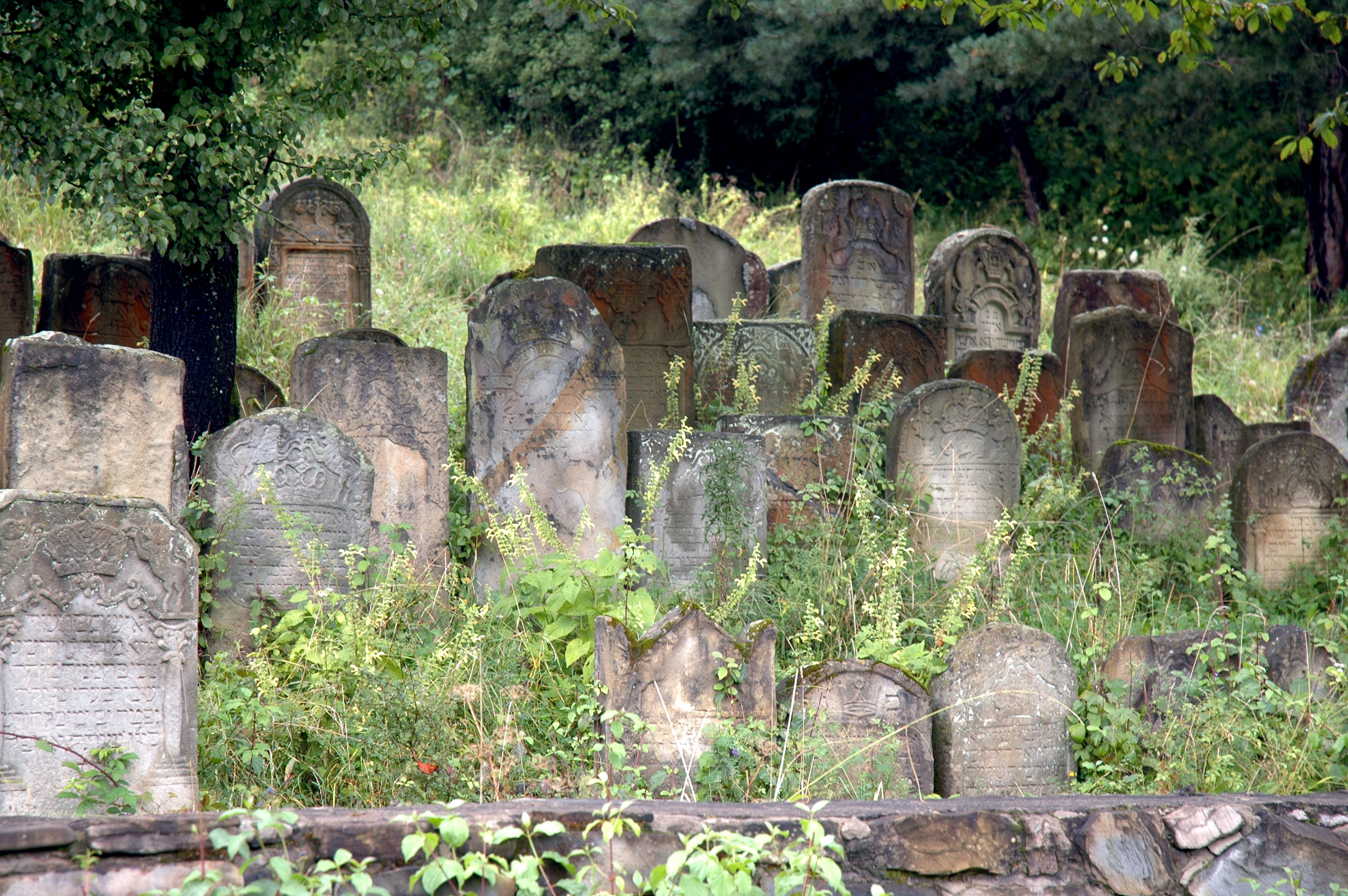
Jewish cemetery

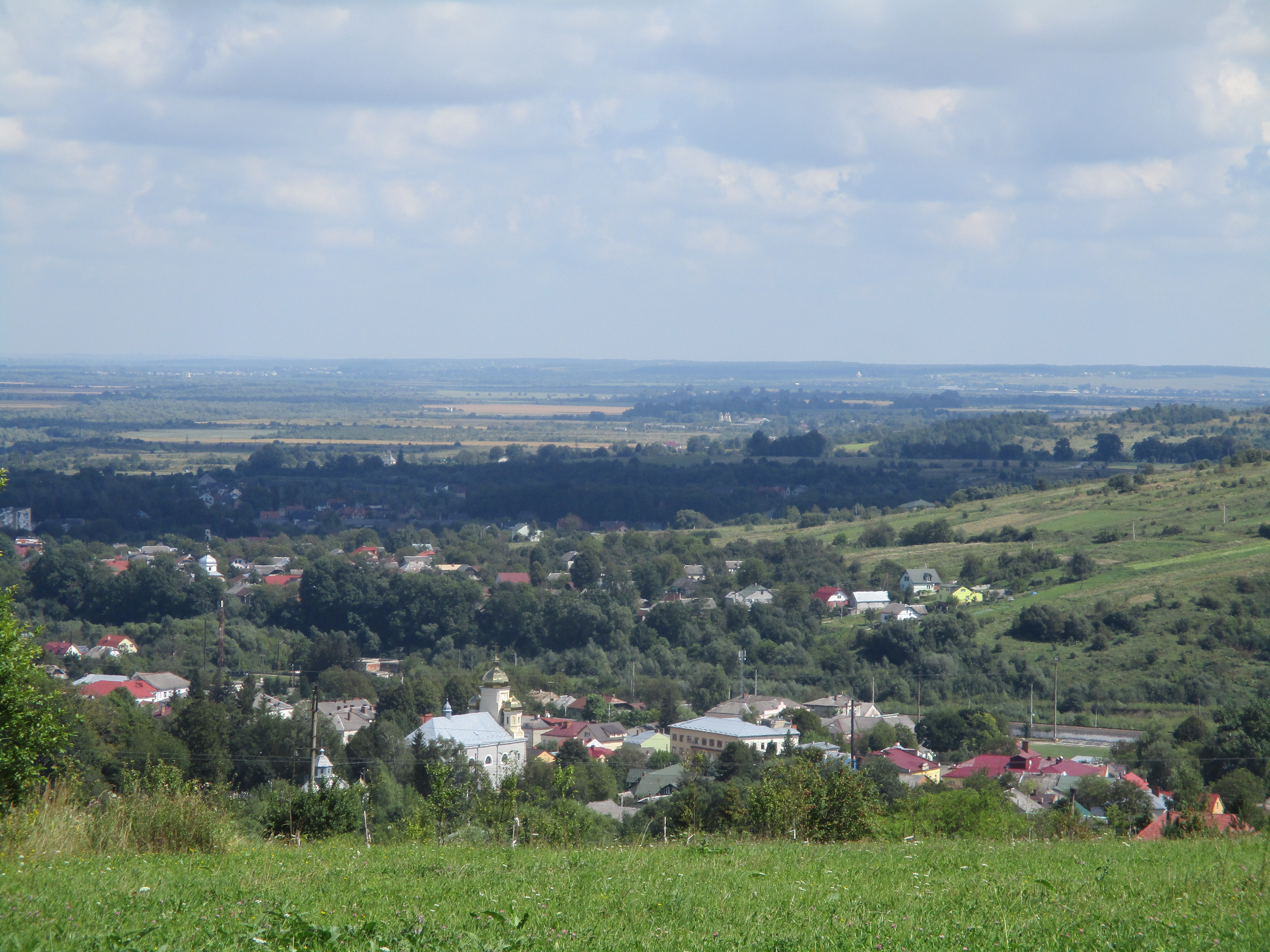
A view of Staryi Sambir with the Orthodox Church of St. Nicholas

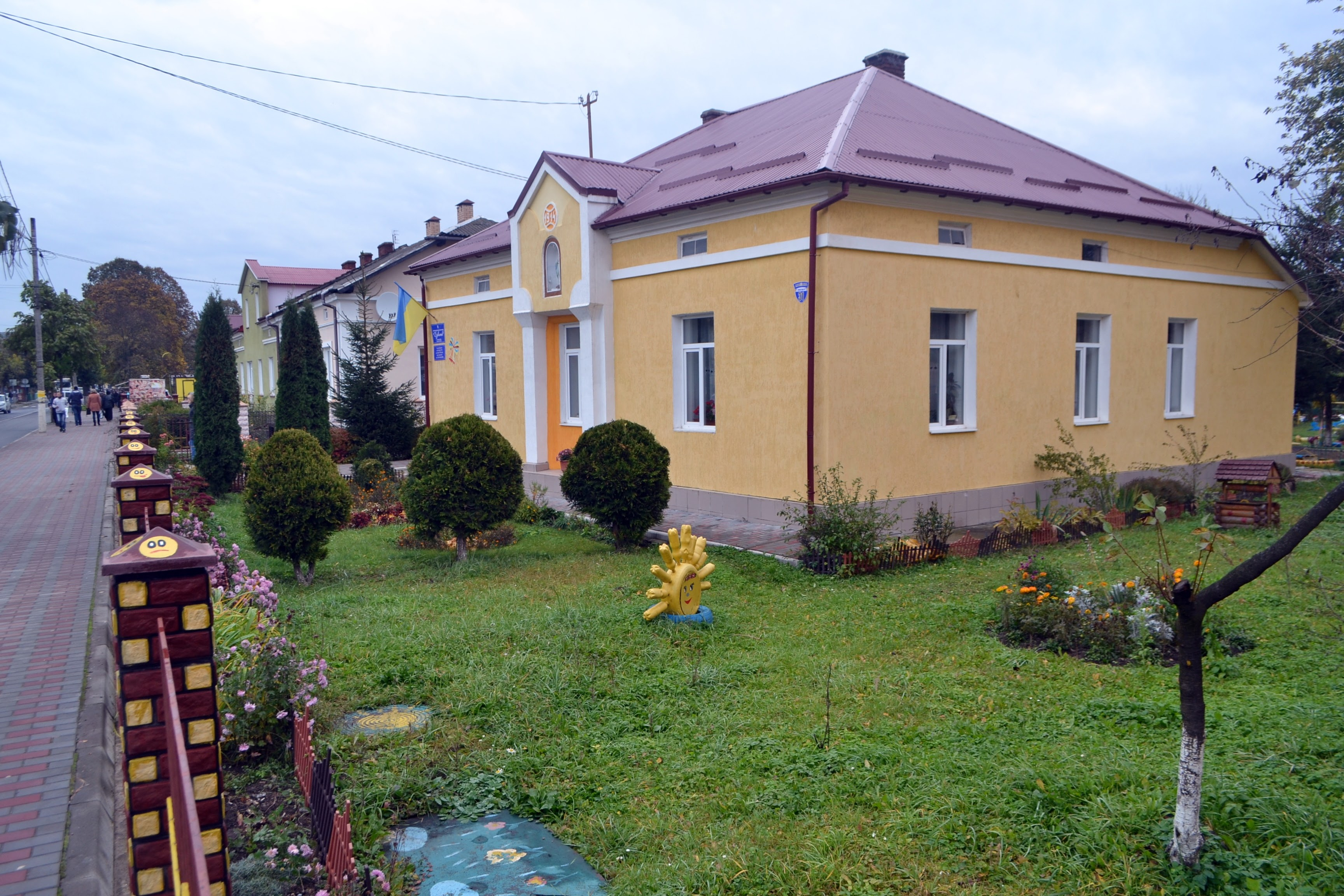
Old house

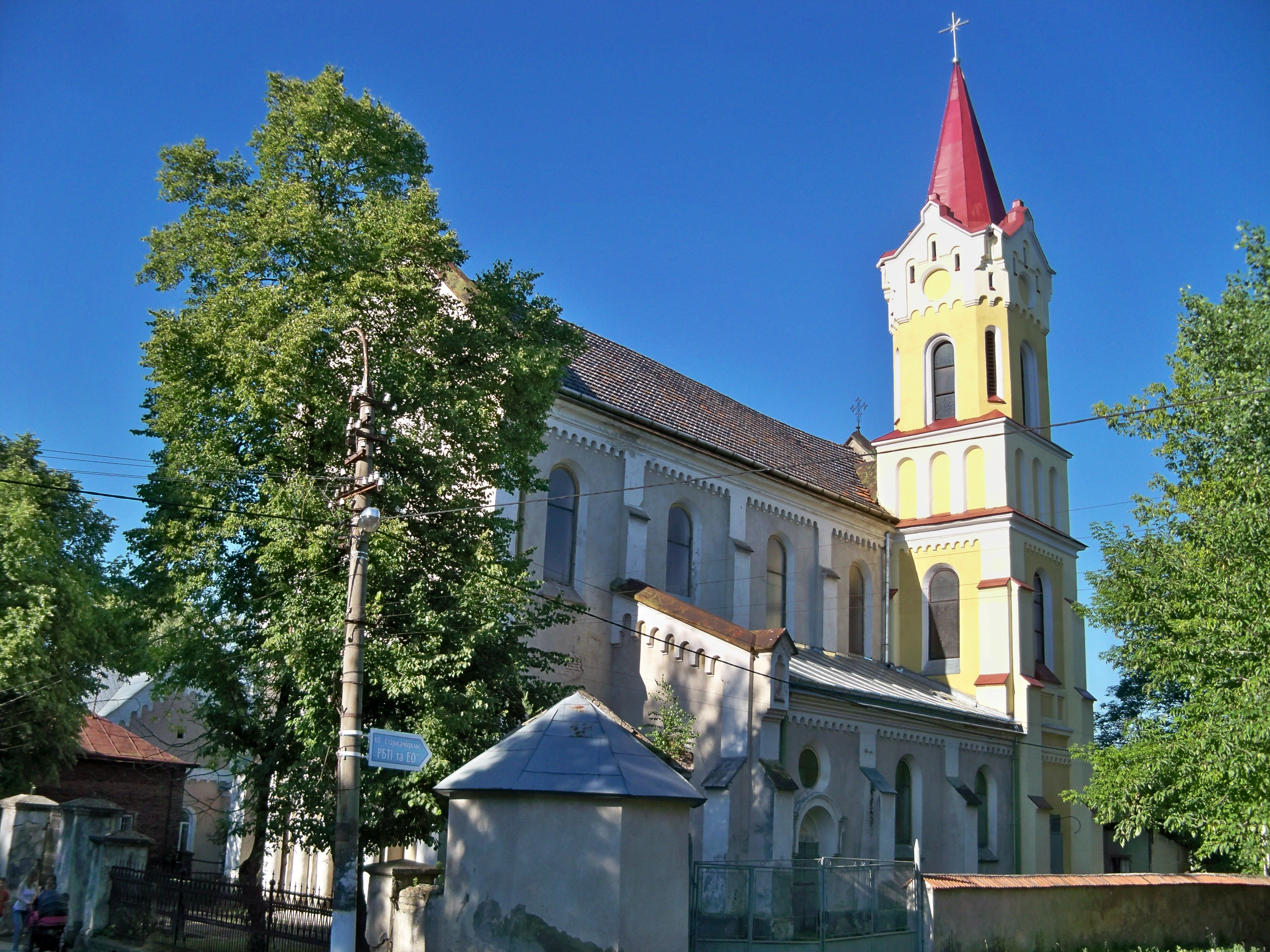
Catholic Church of St. Nicholas

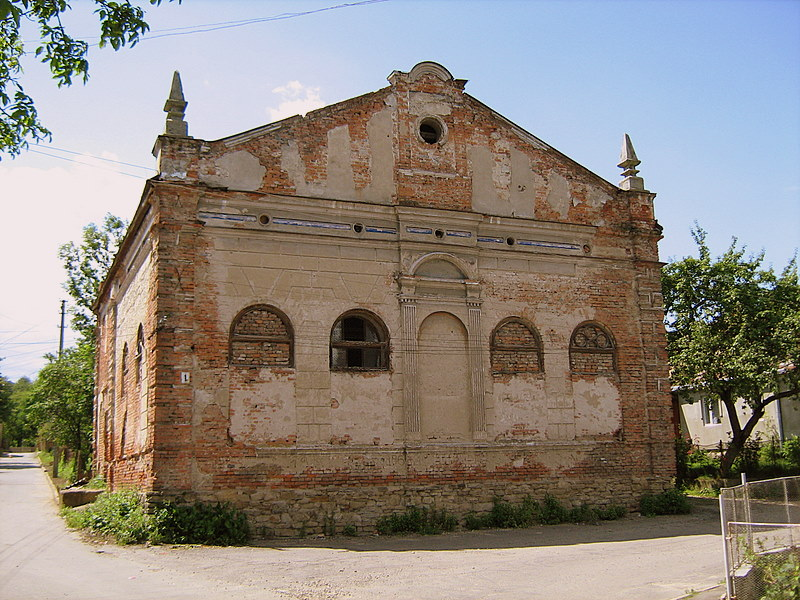
Staryi Sambir Synagogue

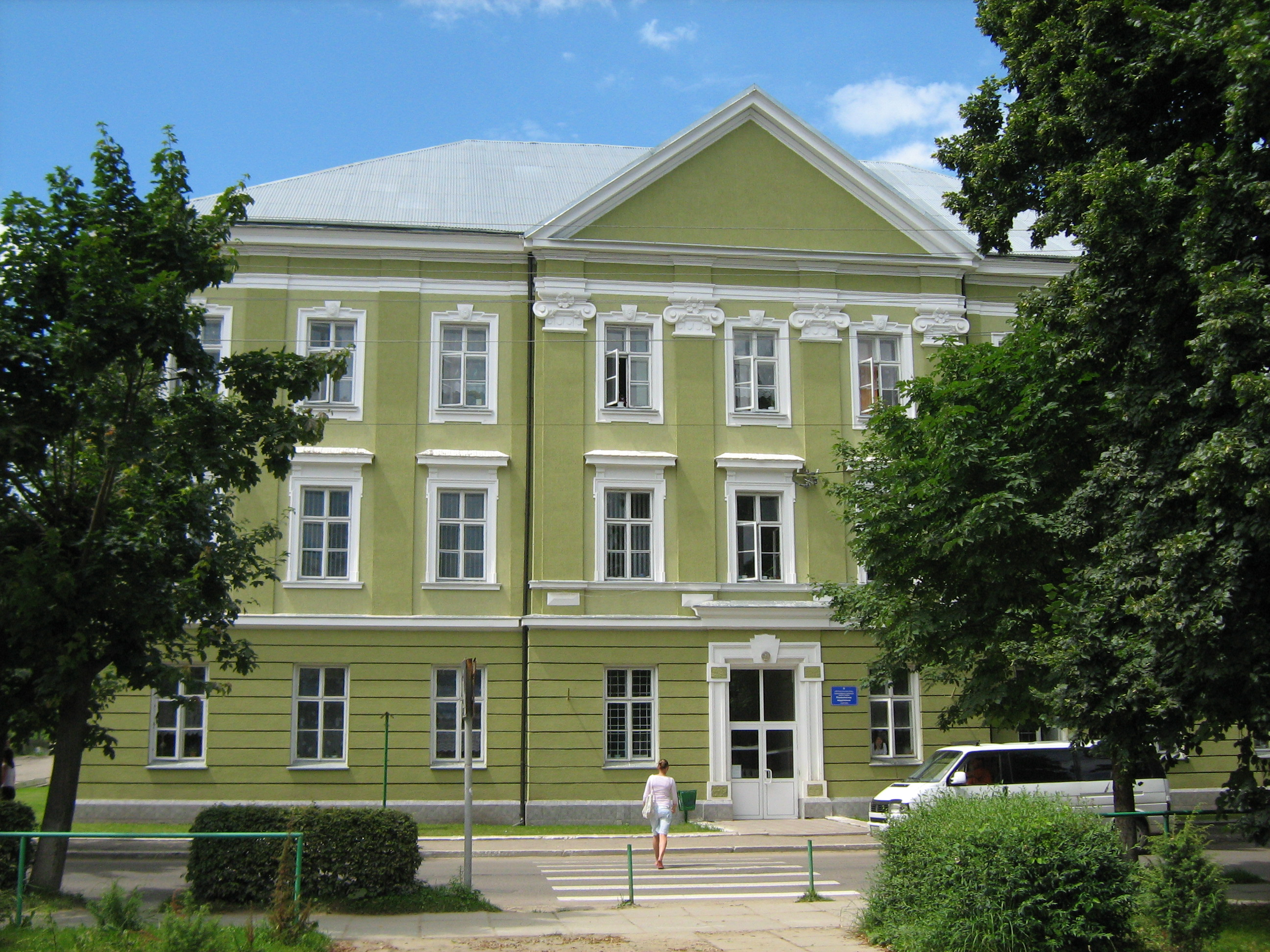
Clinic

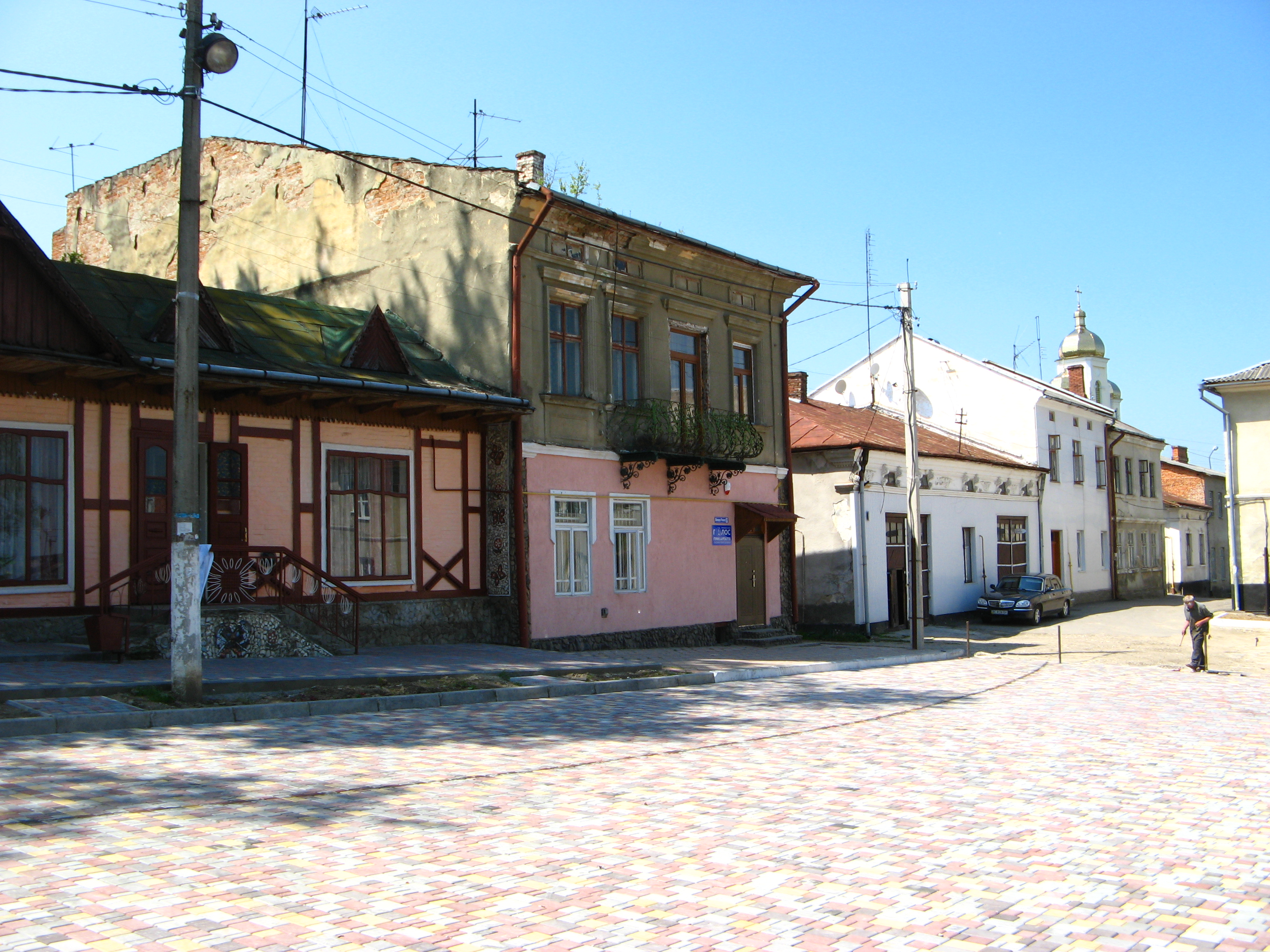
Premises of the editorial office of a newspaper

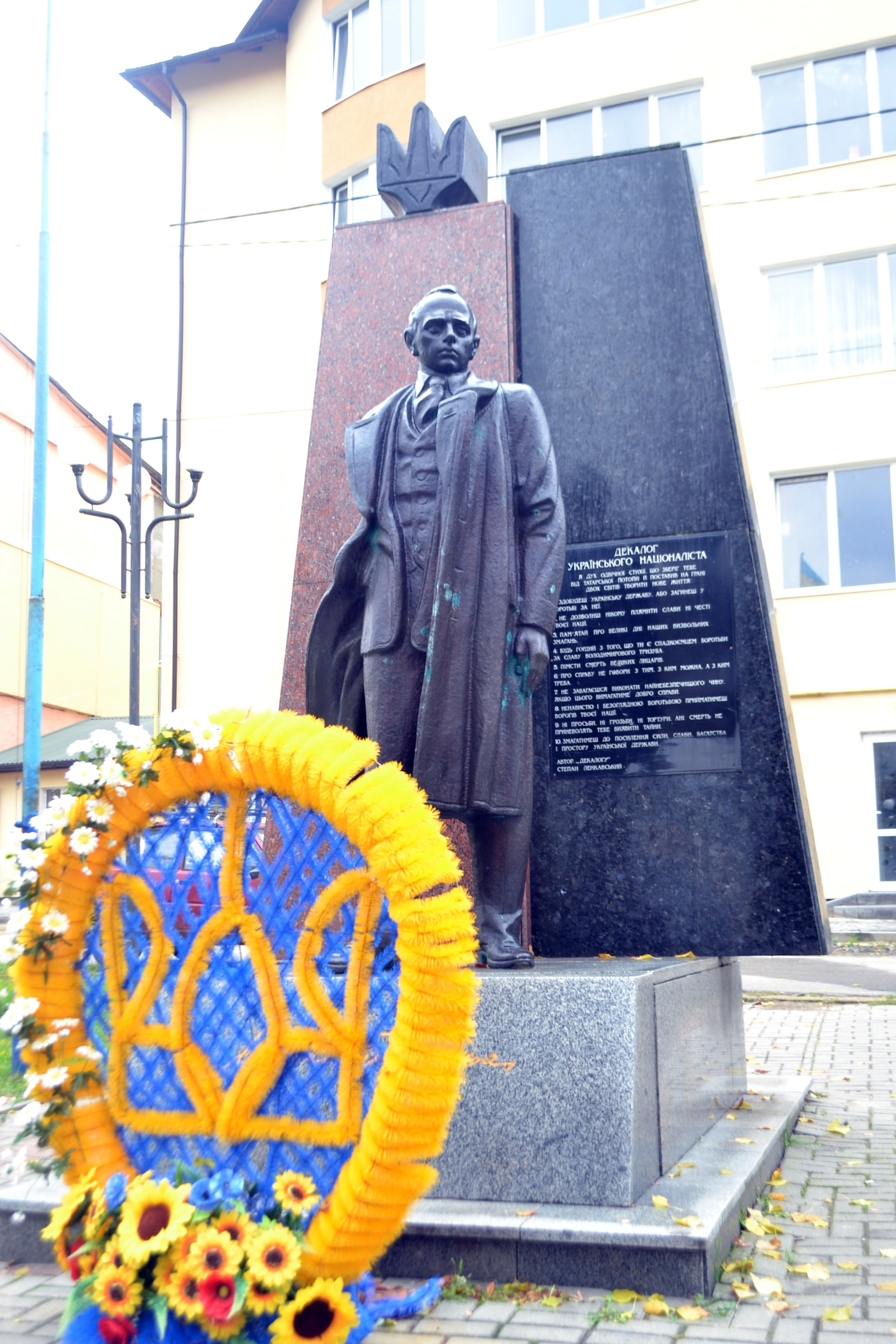
Monument to Stepan Bandera

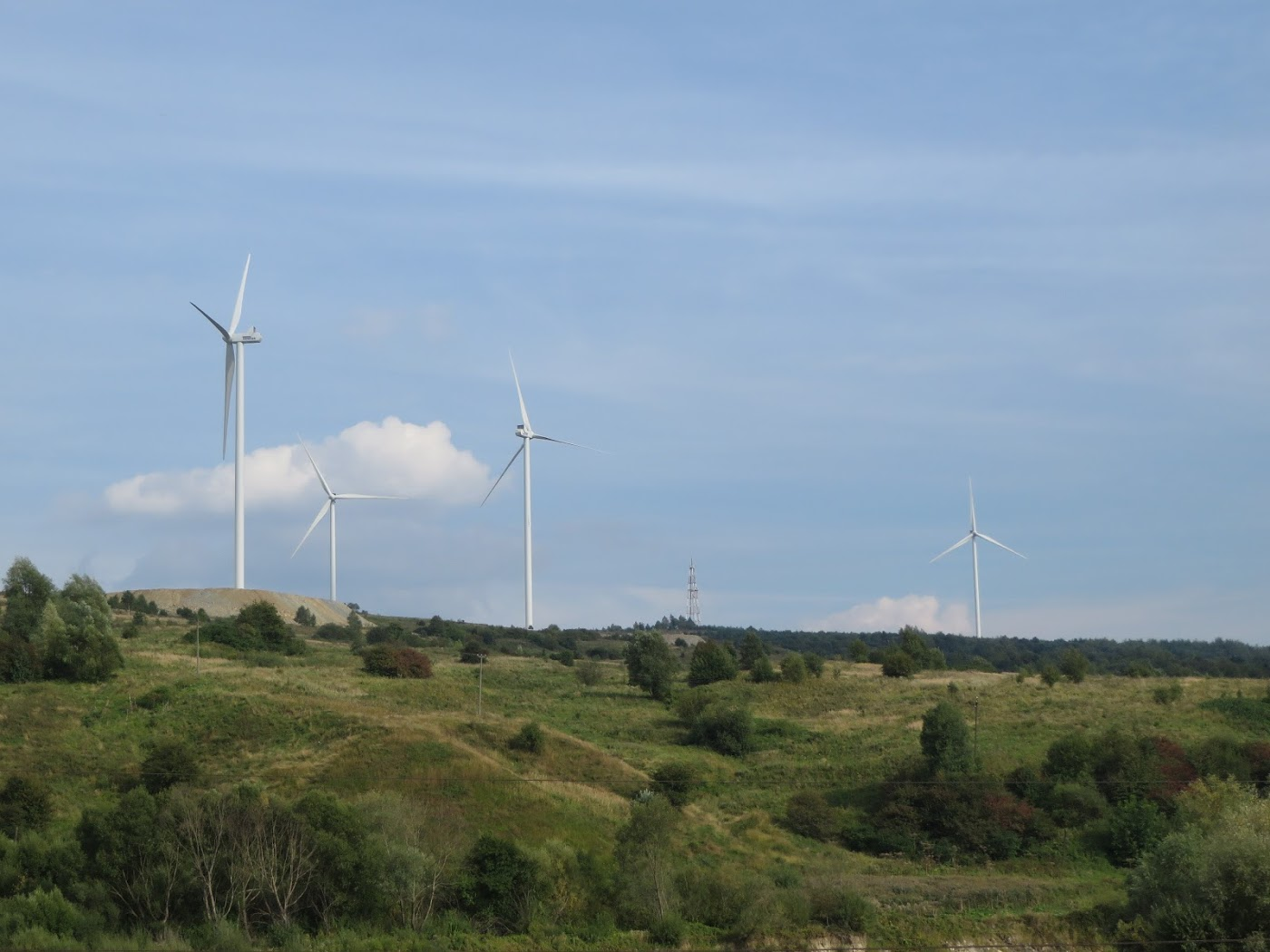
Wind turbines near the city
