= Kalinov =

Kalinov can refer to several settlements:

- in Slovakia:
  - Kalinov, a village in Medzilaborce District
  - a part of the municipality Krásno nad Kysucou
- in Ukraine (Ukrainian: Kalyniv):
  - Kalyniv
  - a settlement in Lviv Oblast
  - Kalyniv
  - a settlement in Sumska Oblast
- in Russia, a settlement situated in the administrative units:
  - Orlovskaya Oblast
  - Kurskaya Oblast
  - Voronezhskaya Oblast
  - Rostovskaya Oblast
  - Krasnodar Krai
  - Volgogradskaya Oblast

Kalinov airfield (Ukrainian: Kalyniv)

- in Ukraine:
  - Kalyniv (airfield)
