= Dubliany (disambiguation) =

Dubliany is a city in Lviv Oblast, Ukraine.

Dubliany may also refer to other places in Ukraine:

- Dubliany, Sambir Raion, Lviv Oblast, an urban-type settlement
- Dubliany, Rivne Oblast, a village
