= Dubliany, Sambir Raion, Lviv Oblast =

Rural locality in Lviv Oblast, Ukraine

Dubliany Дубляни
- Rural settlement
- Location in Lviv Oblast Location in Ukraine
- Coordinates: 49°29′55″N 23°23′17″E
- Country: Ukraine
- Oblast: Lviv Oblast
- Raion: Sambir Raion
- Hromada: Novyi Kalyniv urban hromada

Population (2022)
  - Total: 1,647
- Time zone: UTC+2 (EET)
  - Summer (DST): UTC+3 (EEST)

Dubliany (Ukrainian: Дубляни) is a rural settlement in Sambir Raion of Lviv Oblast in Ukraine. It is located southwest of Lviv and about 10 kilometres (6.2 mi) east of the town of Sambir. Dubliany belongs to Novyi Kalyniv urban hromada, one of the hromadas of Ukraine. Population: 1,647 (2022 estimate)

Until 26 January 2024, Dubliany was designated urban-type settlement. On this day, a new law entered into force which abolished this status, and Dubliany became a rural settlement.

== Geography ==
Dubliany is located in the Dniester Lowland geographic area.

== Economy ==
=== Transportation ===
Dubliany railway station is on the railway line connecting Sambir and Stryi. There is regular passenger traffic.

The settlement has access, via both Sambir and Novyi Kalyniv, to Highway H13 which connects Lviv and Uzhhorod.
