= Kornalovychi =

Rural locality in Lviv Oblast, Ukraine

Kornalovychi Корналовичі
- Village
- Location within Ukraine
- Coordinates: 49°32′26″N 23°21′28″E
- Country: Ukraine
- Oblast: Lviv
- Raion: Sambir
- Area: 24.246 km^{2} (9.361 sq mi)
- Population: 1,047
  - Density: 43.18/km^{2} (111.8/sq mi)

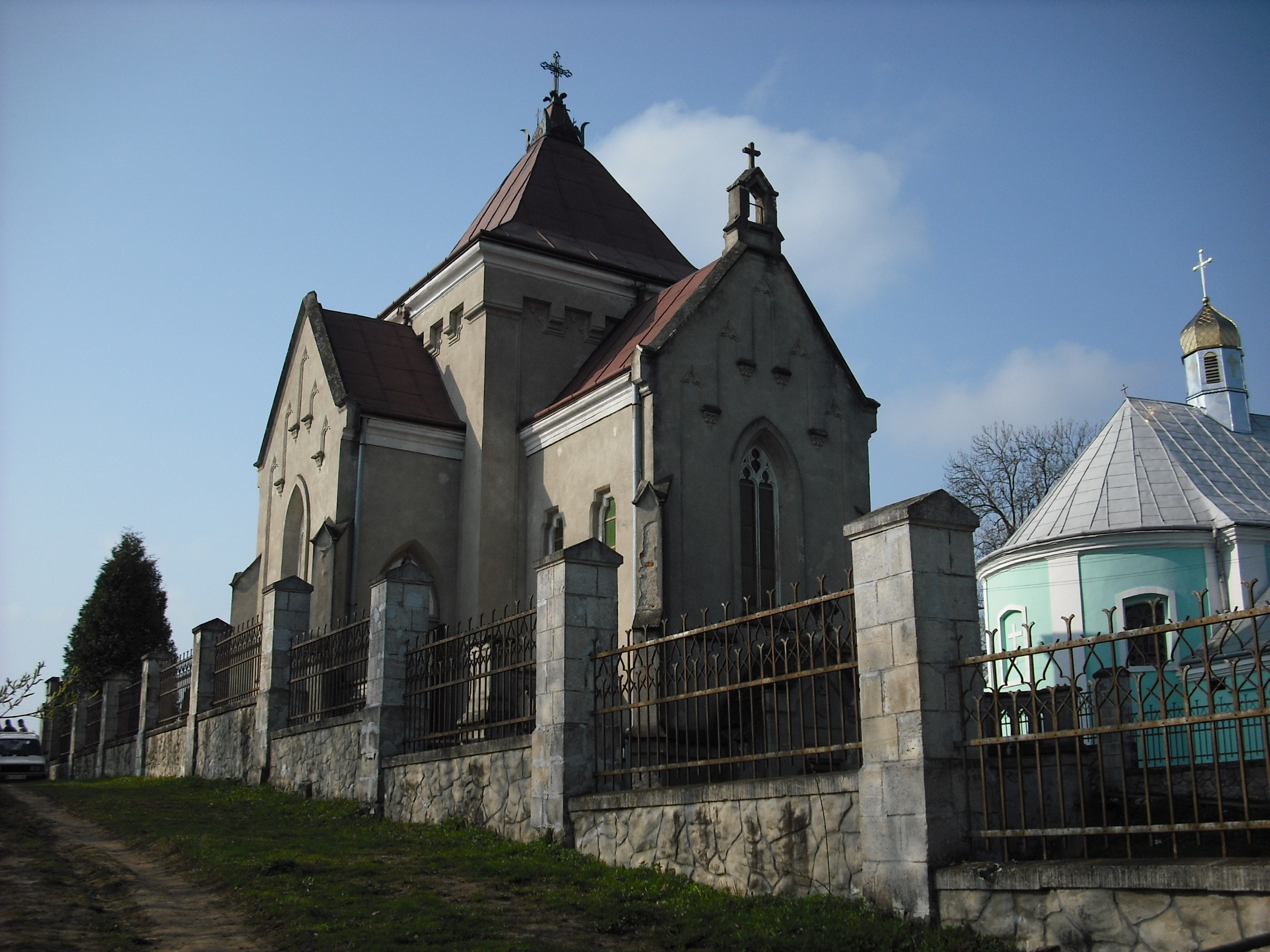
Our Lady of Częstochowa church in Kornalovychi

Kornalovychi (Ukrainian: Корналовичі, Polish: Kornalowice or Kornałowice) is a village (selo) in Sambir Raion, Lviv Oblast, in south-west Ukraine. It belongs to Novyi Kalyniv urban hromada, one of the hromadas of Ukraine.

The local Catholic parish was first mentioned in 1375. An Orthodox church was mentioned already in 1507. In the interwar period the village belonged to Poland and had around 2,000 inhabitants, over half of them were Poles.
