= Hordynia =

Rural locality in Lviv Oblast, Ukraine

Hordynia Гординя
- Village
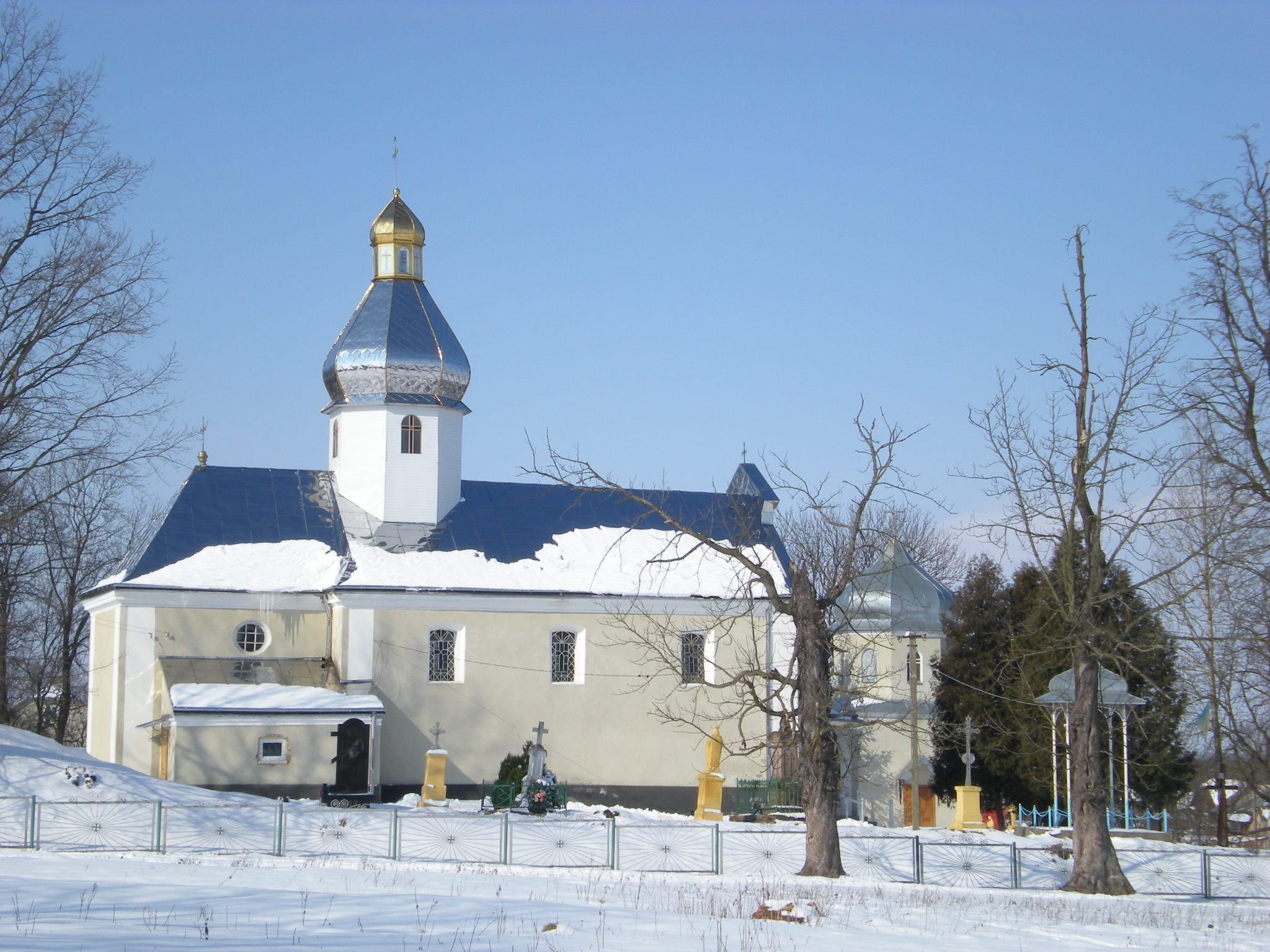
- Hordynia

- Location within Ukraine
- Coordinates: 49°32′13″N 23°23′12″E
- Country: Ukraine
- Oblast: Lviv Oblast
- Raion: Sambir Raion
- Hromada: Novyi Kalyniv urban hromada
- Area: 26.023 km^{2} (10.048 sq mi)
- Population: 988
  - Density: 38.0/km^{2} (98.3/sq mi)

Hordynia (Ukrainian: Гординя; Polish: Hordynia) is a village (selo) in Sambir Raion, Lviv Oblast, in south-west Ukraine. Hordynia belongs to Novyi Kalyniv urban hromada, one of the hromadas of Ukraine.

The local Catholic parish was first mentioned in 1400.
