= Novyi Kalyniv Air Base =

Airport in Lviv Oblast

Kalyniv airfield
- IATA: none; ICAO: UKLA

Summary
- Serves: Novyi Kalyniv
- Location: Kalyniv
- Elevation AMSL: 860 ft (260 m)
- Coordinates: 49°33′0″N 023°20′6″E
- Interactive map of Kalyniv

Runways
Direction	Length		Surface
Direction	ft	m	Surface
07/25	7,300	2,225	Concrete

Airfield "Kalyniv" (Ukrainian: Авіабаза Калинів) (ICAO: UKLA) is an airfield in Ukraine, located about 0.5 km (0.31 mi) northeast of Kalyniv and 10 km (6.2 mi) northeast of Sambir, near the Polish border.

It is home to the 12th Separate Army Aviation Brigade.

== Notes ==
- Carpathian military district's USSR air force
