= Novyi Kalyniv urban hromada =

Hromada in Lviv Oblast, Ukraine

Novyi Kalyniv urban hromada Новокалинівська міська громада
- Hromada
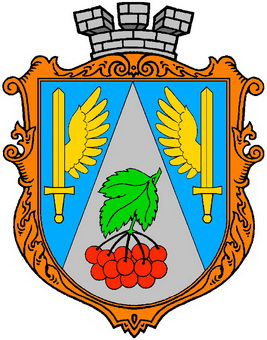
- Seal
- Interactive map of Novyi Kalyniv urban hromada
- Country: Ukraine
- Oblast: Lviv Oblast
- Raion: Sambir Raion
- Admin. center: Novyi Kalyniv

Area
  - Total: 2,521 km^{2} (973 sq mi)

Population (2021)
  - Total: 14,227
  - Density: 5.643/km^{2} (14.62/sq mi)
- CATOTTG code: UA46080070000035761
- Settlements: 25
- Cities: 1
- Rural settlements: 1
- Villages: 23
- Website: novokalynivska-gromada.gov.ua

Novyi Kalyniv urban hromada (Ukrainian: Новокалинівська міська громада) is a hromada in Ukraine, in Sambir Raion of Lviv Oblast. The administrative center is the city of Novyi Kalyniv.

== Settlements ==
The hromada consists of 1 city (Novyi Kalyniv), 1 rural settlement (Dubliany) and 23 villages:

- Babyna
- Berehy
- Birchytsi
- Velyka Bilyna
- Velyka Ozymyna
- Velyka Khvoroshcha
- Hordynia
- Zaluzhany
- Zaraiske
- Kalyniv
- Klymivshchyna
- Kovynychi
- Kornalovychi
- Kornychi
- Kruzhyky
- Luka
- Mainych
- Mala Bilyna
- Mala Ozymyna
- Mala Khvoroshcha
- Mistkovychi
- Novi Birchytsi
- Pyniany
