= Zaluzhany, Sambir Raion =

Rural locality in Lviv Oblast, Ukraine

Zaluzhany Залужани
- Village
- Location within Ukraine Location within Europe
- Coordinates: 49°30′38″N 23°27′13″E
- Country: Ukraine
- Oblast: Lviv Oblast
- Raion: Sambir Raion
- Hromada: Novyi Kalyniv
- Founded: 10th century
- Area: 8.5 km^{2} (3.3 sq mi)
- Elevation: 280 m (920 ft)
- Population (2001): 386
  - Density: 45/km^{2} (120/sq mi)
- Time zone: UTC+2 (EET)
  - Summer (DST): UTC+3 (EEST)
- Postal codes: 81472
- Area code: +380 3236

Zaluzhany (Ukrainian: Залужани, before 1946 – Tatary) is a village (selo) in Sambir Raion, Lviv Oblast, in Western Ukraine. It belongs to Novyi Kalyniv urban hromada, one of the hromadas of Ukraine. As of 2001, it has a population of 386.

== Climate ==
Zaluzhany

Climate chart (precipitation, max. and min. temperature)
J	F	M	A	M	J	J	A	S	O	N	D
46 0 −6	50 1 −5	55 7 −2	63 14 4	91 18 9	90 21 12	110 23 15	80 23 14	75 18 10	62 13 5	55 7 1	53 2 −3
- █ Average max. and min. temperatures in °C
- █ Precipitation totals in mm
- Source: Zaluzhany «Climate-Data.org»
Imperial conversion
J	F	M	A	M	J	J	A	S	O	N	D
1.8 31 21	2 34 23	2.2 44 29	2.5 57 39	3.6 65 47	3.5 71 54	4.3 74 58	3.1 74 57	3 65 49	2.4 55 41	2.2 45 34	2.1 35 26
- █ Average max. and min. temperatures in °F
- █ Precipitation totals in inches

== History ==
In the village the settlement of the Copper Age was studied.

== Demographics ==
1880	1885	1892	1903	1939	1989	2001
→ 852	↗ 858	↘ 853	↗ 967	↗ 1013	↘ 398	↘ 386

According to the 2001 census, the entire population of villages was Ukrainian-speaking (100%).

== Bibliography ==
- Богдан Виханський (2004). Залужани: Історія та сучасність. Історико — краєзнавчий нарис (in Ukrainian). Дрогобич: Видавництво «Коло».
