= Dubliany, Rivne Oblast =

Village in Rivne Oblast, Ukraine

Dubliany Дубляни
- Village
- Location in Rivne Oblast Location in Ukraine
- Coordinates: 50°26′41″N 25°20′28″E
- Country: Ukraine
- Oblast: Rivne Oblast
- Raion: Dubno Raion

Population (2001)
  - Total: 726
- Time zone: UTC+2 (EET)
  - Summer (DST): UTC+3 (EEST)
- Postal code: 35209
- Area code: +380 3637

Dubliany (Ukrainian: Дубляни) is a village in Rivne Oblast, Ukraine. The village is located in Demydivka Hromada, Dubno Raion, approximately 2 km from the urban-type settlement of Demydivka, and has a population of 726.

== History ==
The village is known to have suffered from Tatar invasion in the spring of 1621.

In the 1940s, the villages of Dubliany and Old Dubliany were merged to form the modern-day village of Dubliany.

On 12 June 2020, the village was transferred to Demydivka Hromada in Demydivka Raion following the signing of Order 722 ("On the definition of administrative centres and the confirmation of the territory of territorial communities in Rivne Oblast") of the Cabinet of Ministers of Ukraine.

On 17 July 2020, the village was further transferred to Dubno Raion as a result of the dissolution of Demydivka Raion.

== Demographics ==
According to the 2001 Ukrainian census, the village had a population of 726.

=== Language ===
The distribution of native languages in the 2001 census was as follows:

Native languages in Dubliany (2001)
Language	% of population
Ukrainian	99.59%
Russian	0.41%

== Religion ==
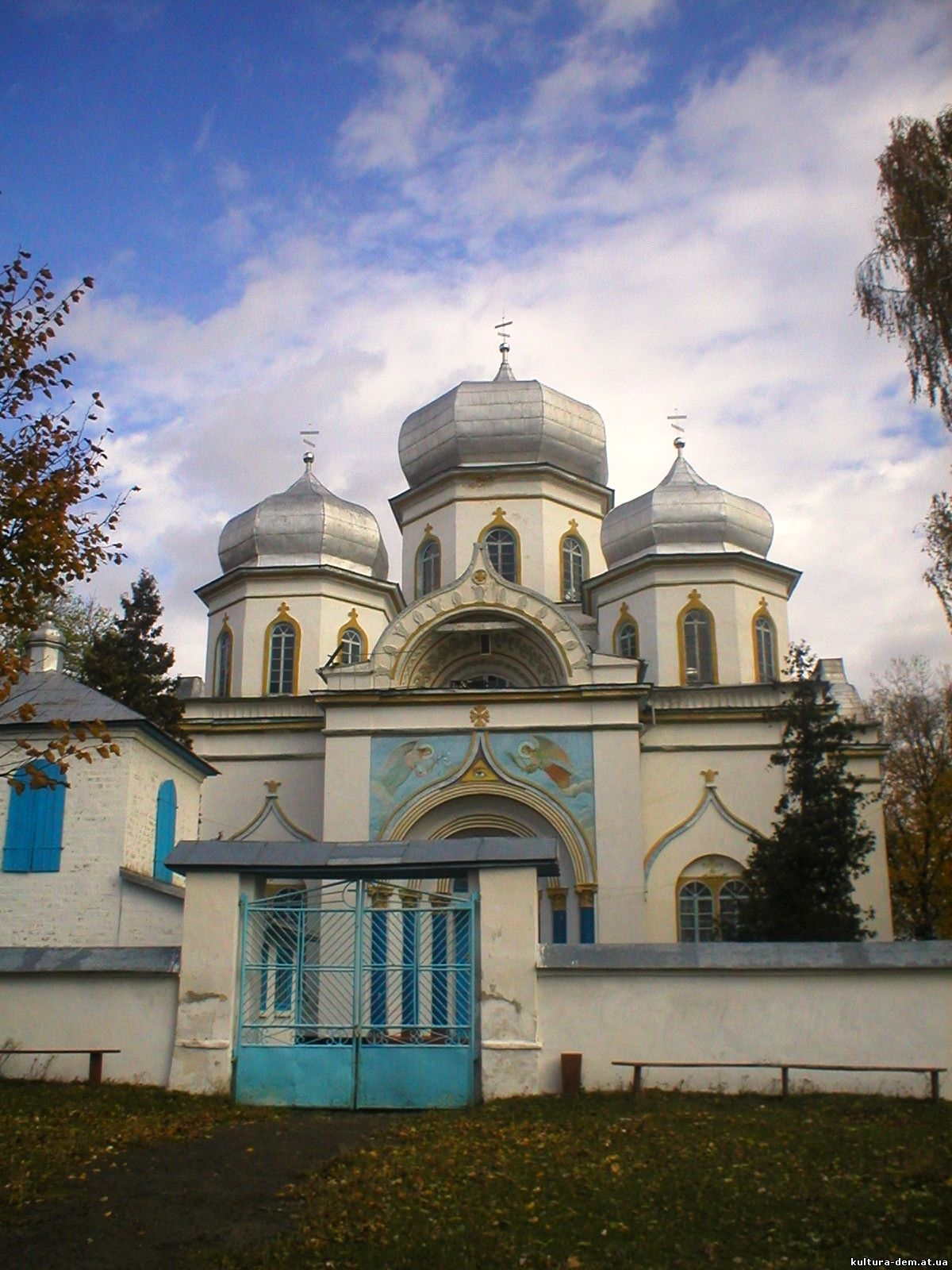
St. Nicholas Church in Dubliany

The village is known for the St. Nicholas Church, which was constructed in 1848 and is a member church of the Orthodox Church of Ukraine. The church has five domes in the typical diocesan style, with a main entrance consisting of three archways of decreasing size. The interior of the church features painted icons.

According to local legend, the church was never intended to be built in Dubliany, but rather in the much larger nearby city of Dubno. Following a successful petition to Tsar Alexander II, the Russian Imperial Treasury allocated funds for the construction of a church in Dubno, but due to a clerical error, the money was instead designated for Dubliany. By the time the people of Dubno had alerted the imperial government to this mistake, construction of the St. Nicholas Church was already underway and therefore the church was completed in Dubliany.
