= Kalinov, Medzilaborce District =

Kalinov
- Municipality
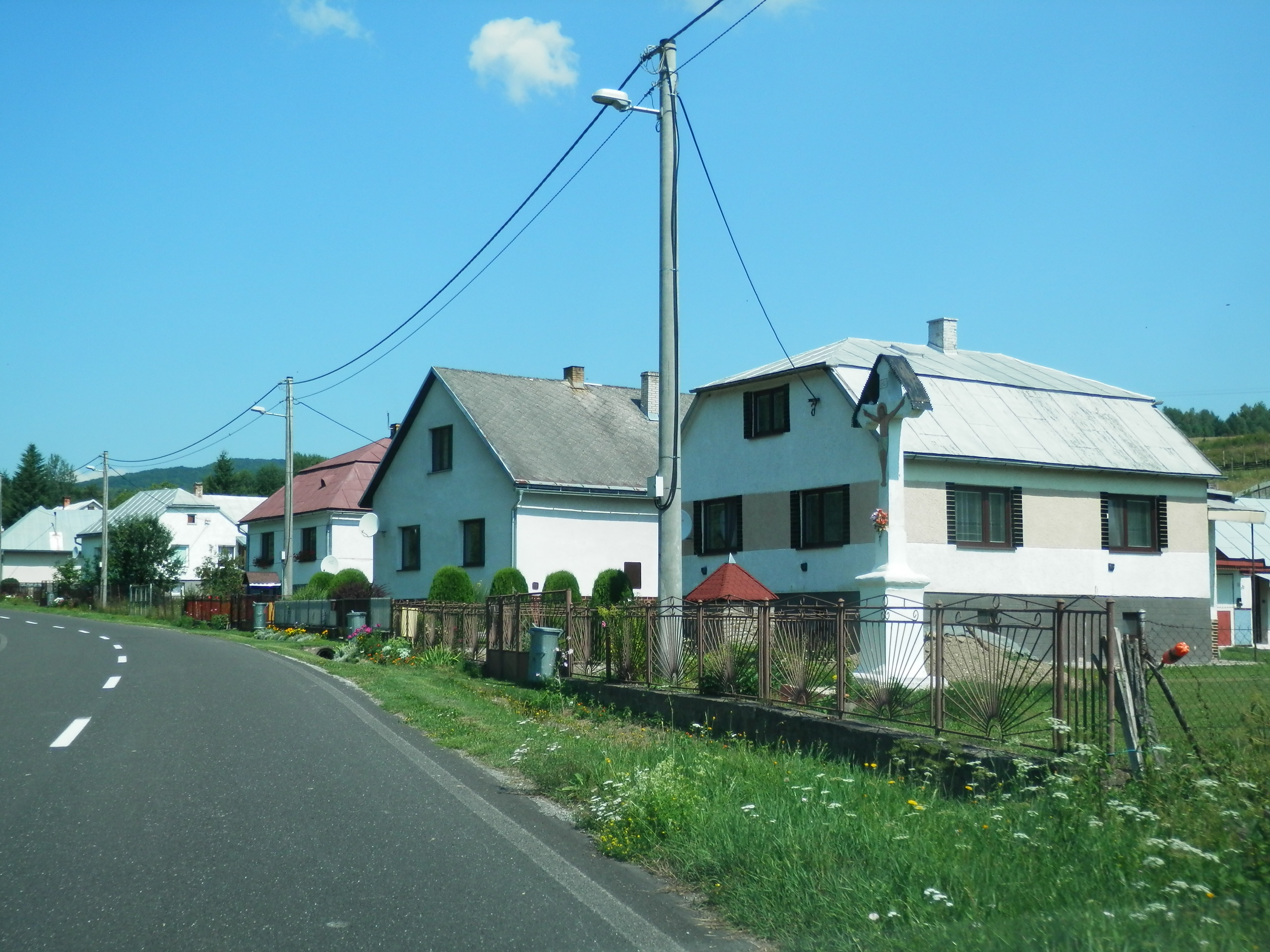

- Flag

- Location of Kalinov in the Prešov Region Location of Kalinov in Slovakia
- Coordinates: 49.32°N 21.93°E
- Country: Slovakia
- Region: Prešov Region
- District: Medzilaborce District
- First mentioned: 1604

Area
  - Total: 13.78 km^{2} (5.32 sq mi)
- Elevation: 432 m (1,417 ft)

Population (2025)
  - Total: 238
- Time zone: UTC+1 (CET)
  - Summer (DST): UTC+2 (CEST)
- Postal code: 675 1
- Area code: +421 57
- Vehicle registration plate (until 2022): ML
- Website: www.kalinov.sk

Kalinov (Rusyn: Калинів; Hungarian: Kalenó) is a village and municipality in the Medzilaborce District in the Prešov Region of far north-eastern Slovakia.

== History ==
In historical records the village was first mentioned in 1596 and 1604. Before the establishment of independent Czechoslovakia in 1918, it was part of Zemplén County within the Kingdom of Hungary. From 1939 to 1944, it was part of the Slovak Republic, a client state of Nazi Germany. On 21 September 1944, the Red Army dislodged the Wehrmacht from Kalinov and it was once again part of Czechoslovakia. It was the first municipality in Czechoslovakia to be liberated from German occupation.

== Geography ==
The municipality lies at an altitude of 432 metres (1,417 ft) and covers an area of 13.78 km^{2} (5.32 sq mi) (2025).

== Population ==
Population statistic (10 years)
Year	1995	2005	2015	2025
Count	365	303	265	238
Difference		−16.98%	−12.54%	−10.18%

Population statistic
Year	2024	2025
Count	243	238
Difference		−2.05%

It has a population of 238 people (31 December 2025).

=== Ethnicity ===
Census 2021 (1+ %)
Ethnicity	Number	Fraction
Slovak	181	69.34%
Rusyn	130	49.8%
Ukrainian	9	3.44%
Not found out	3	1.14%
Total	261	

In year 2021 was 261 people by ethnicity 181 as Slovak, 130 as Rusyn, 9 as Ukrainian, 3 as Not found out, 2 as Czech and 2 as Other.

Note on population: The difference values of population numbers in the table "Population statistic" and in the sections "Ethnicity" & "Religion" is caused by the use of various statistical methods.

=== Religion ===
Census 2021 (1+ %)
Religion	Number	Fraction
Greek Catholic Church	227	86.97%
Eastern Orthodox Church	13	4.98%
None	9	3.45%
Roman Catholic Church	8	3.07%
Not found out	3	1.15%
Total	261	

In year 2021 was 261 people by religion 227 from Greek Catholic Church, 13 from Eastern Orthodox Church, 9 from None, 8 from Roman Catholic Church, 3 from Not found out and 1 from Ad hoc movements.

== Genealogical resources ==
The records for genealogical research are available at the state archive "Statny Archiv in Presov, Slovakia"

- Roman Catholic church records (births/marriages/deaths): 1786-1898 (parish B)
- Greek Catholic church records (births/marriages/deaths): 1794-1895 (parish B)

== Gallery ==
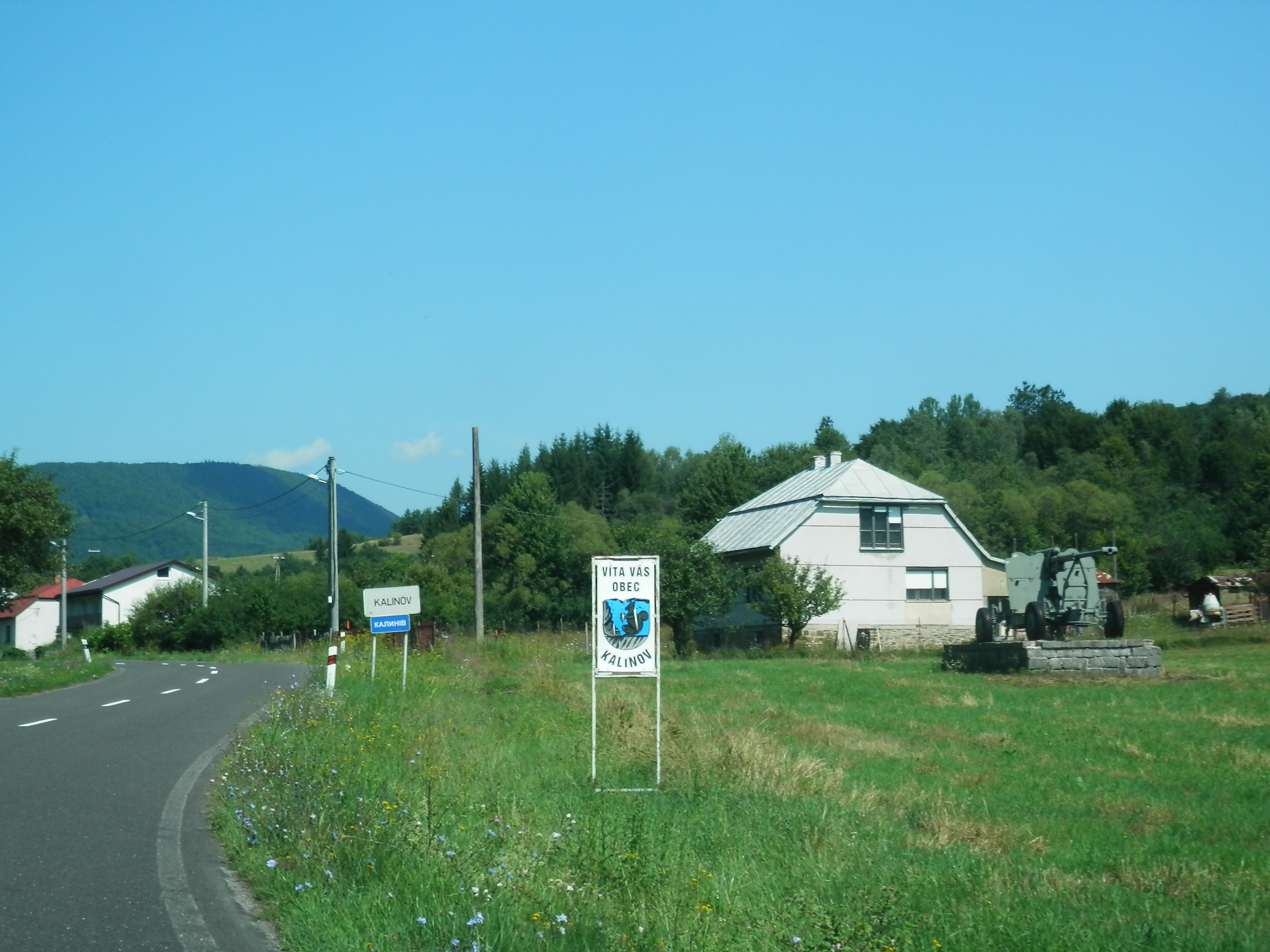
Entering the village of Kalinov

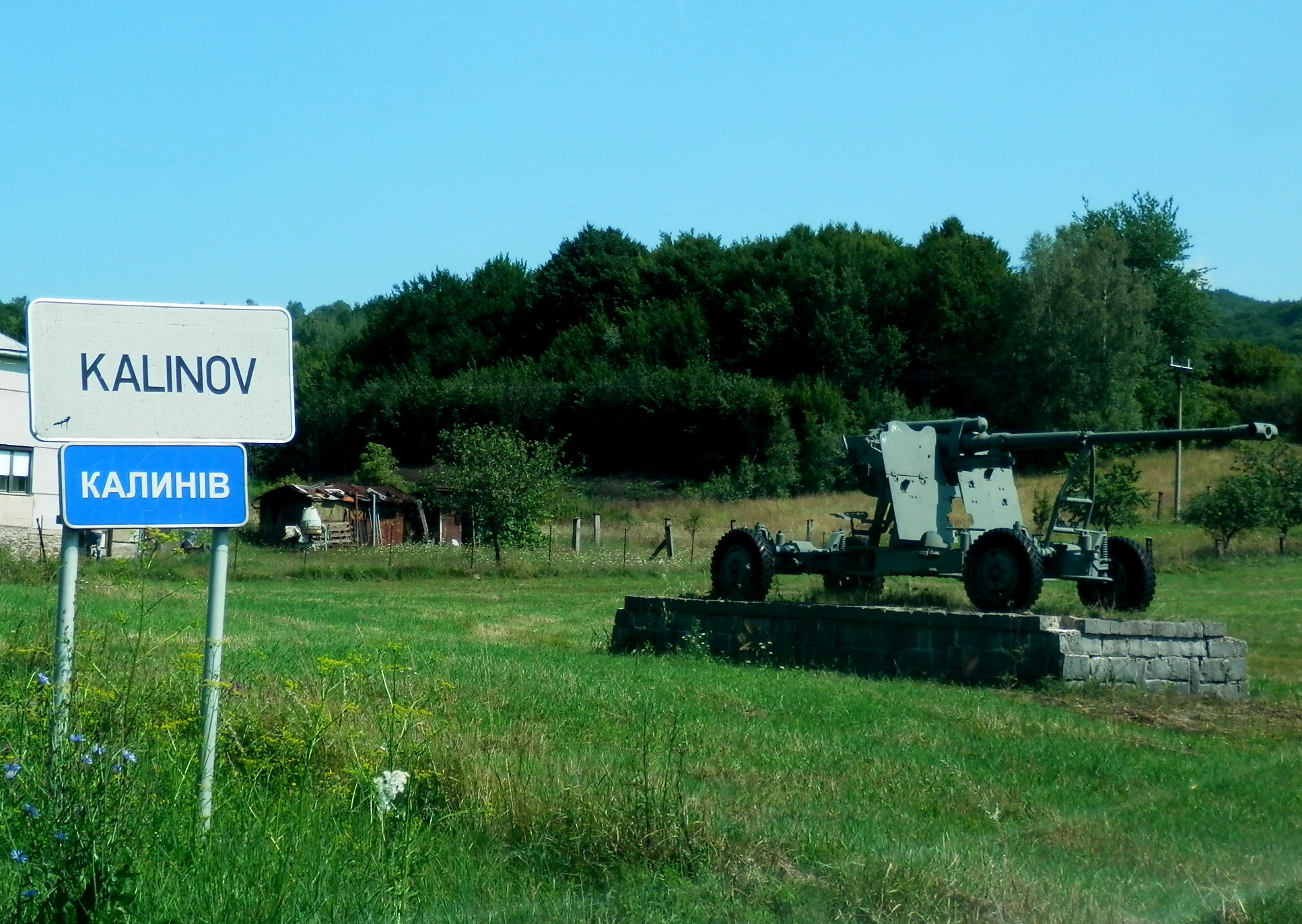
Entering the village of Kalinov (WWII liberation memorial with displayed artillery piece)

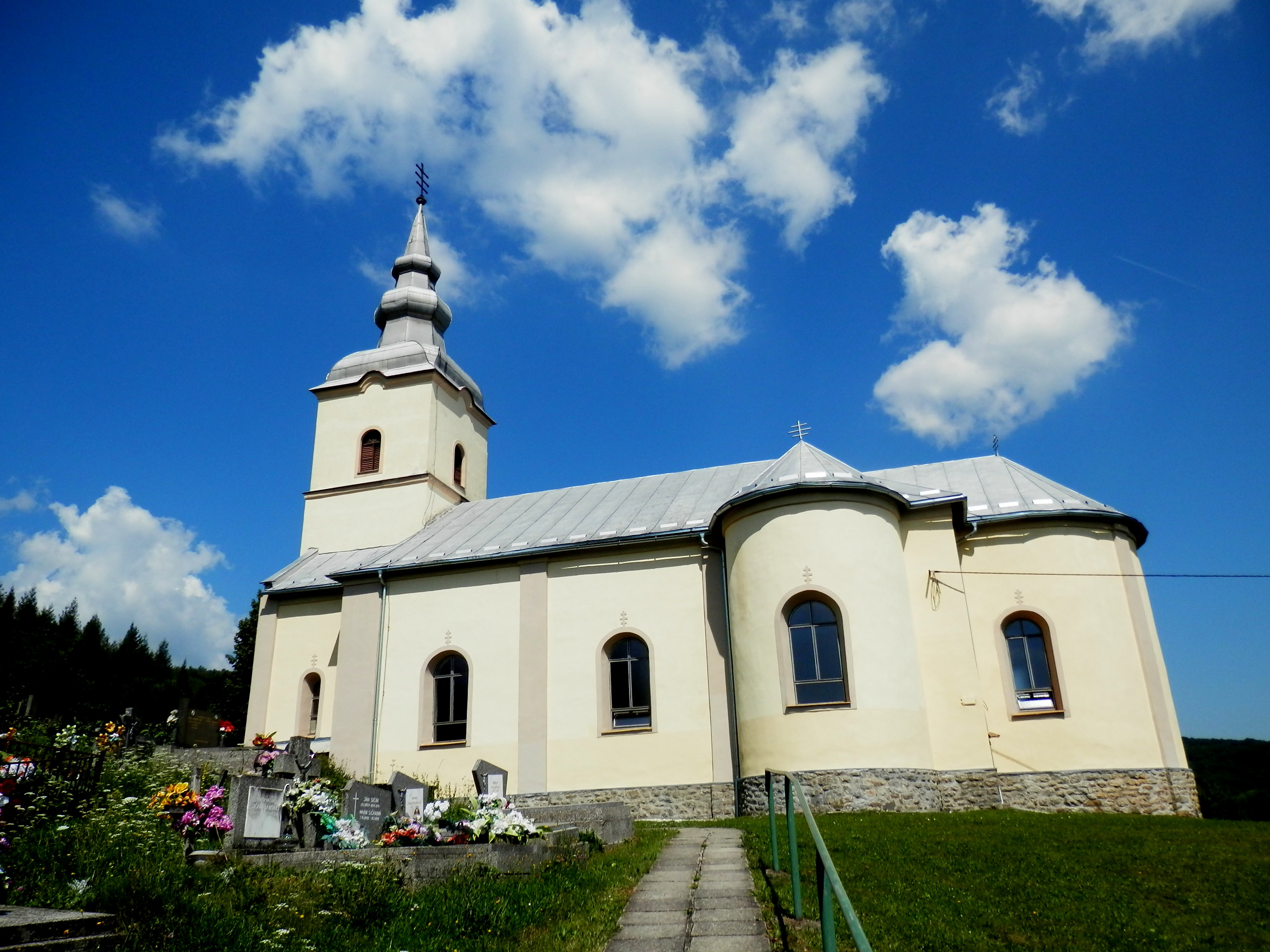
Greek Catholic church of the Sleep of Our Lady in Kalinov (est. first half of the 18th century)

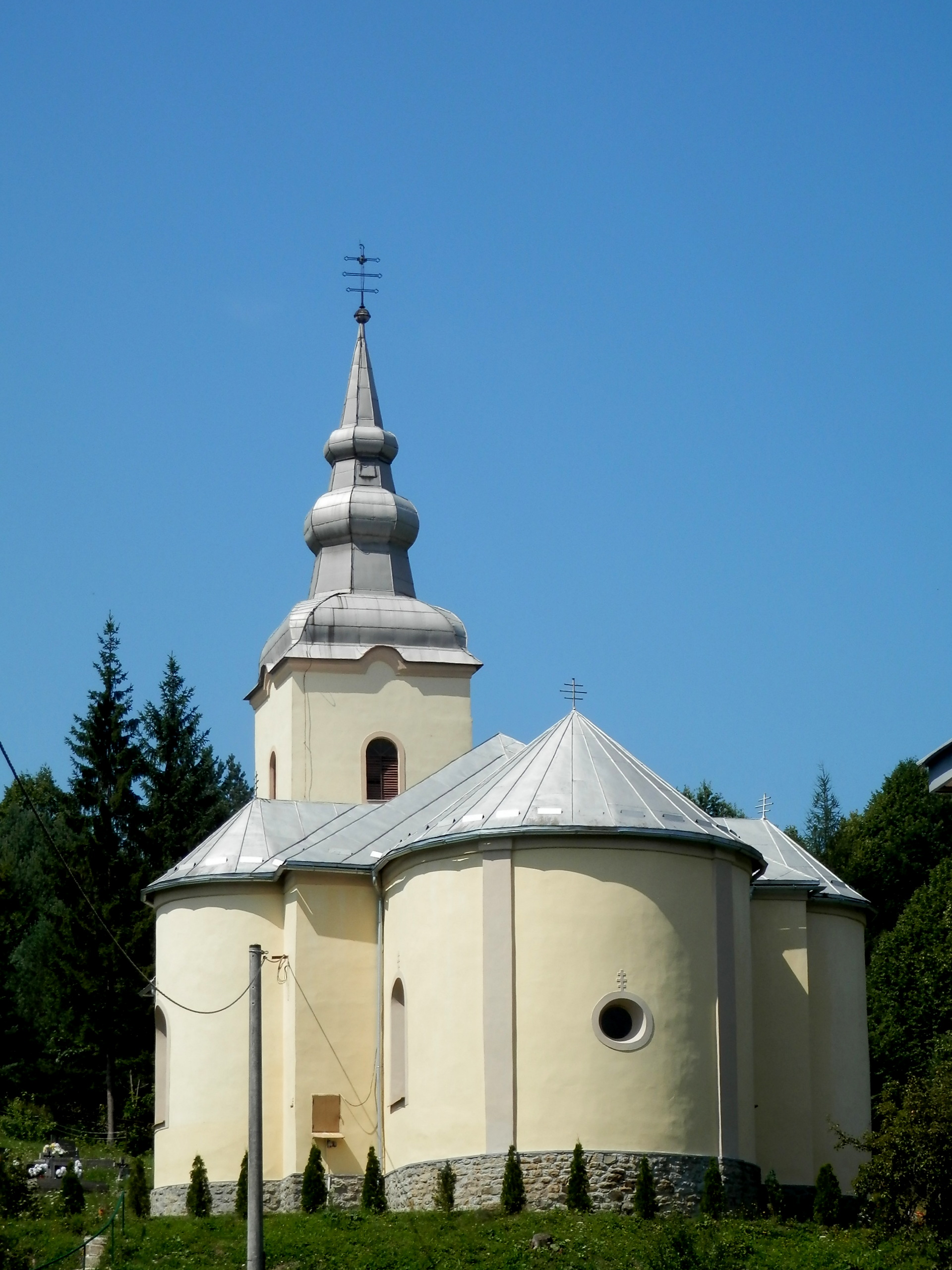
Greek Catholic church of the Sleep of Our Lady in Kalinov (est. first half of the 18th century)

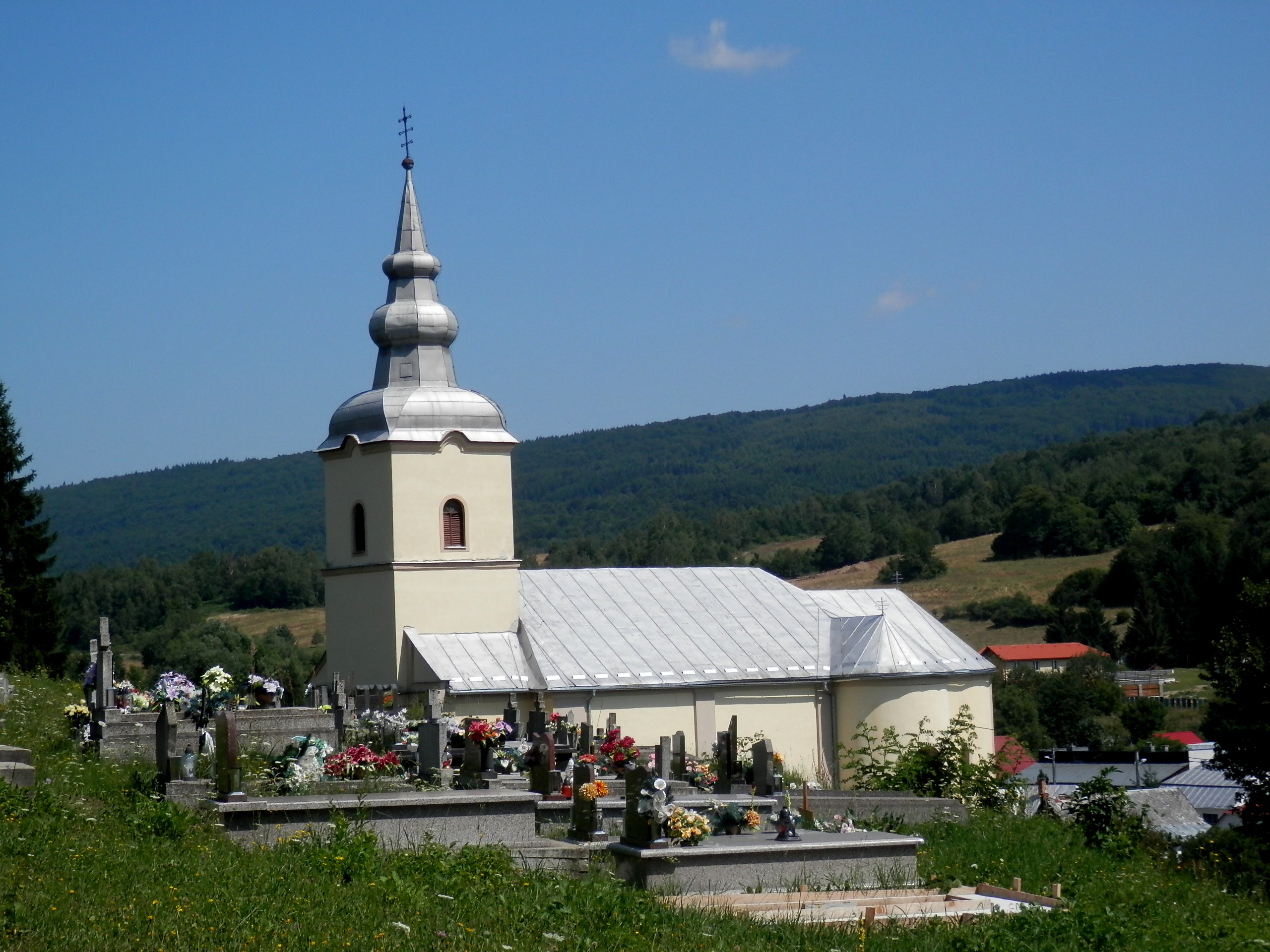
Greek Catholic church of the Sleep of Our Lady in Kalinov (est. first half of the 18th century) and village cemetery

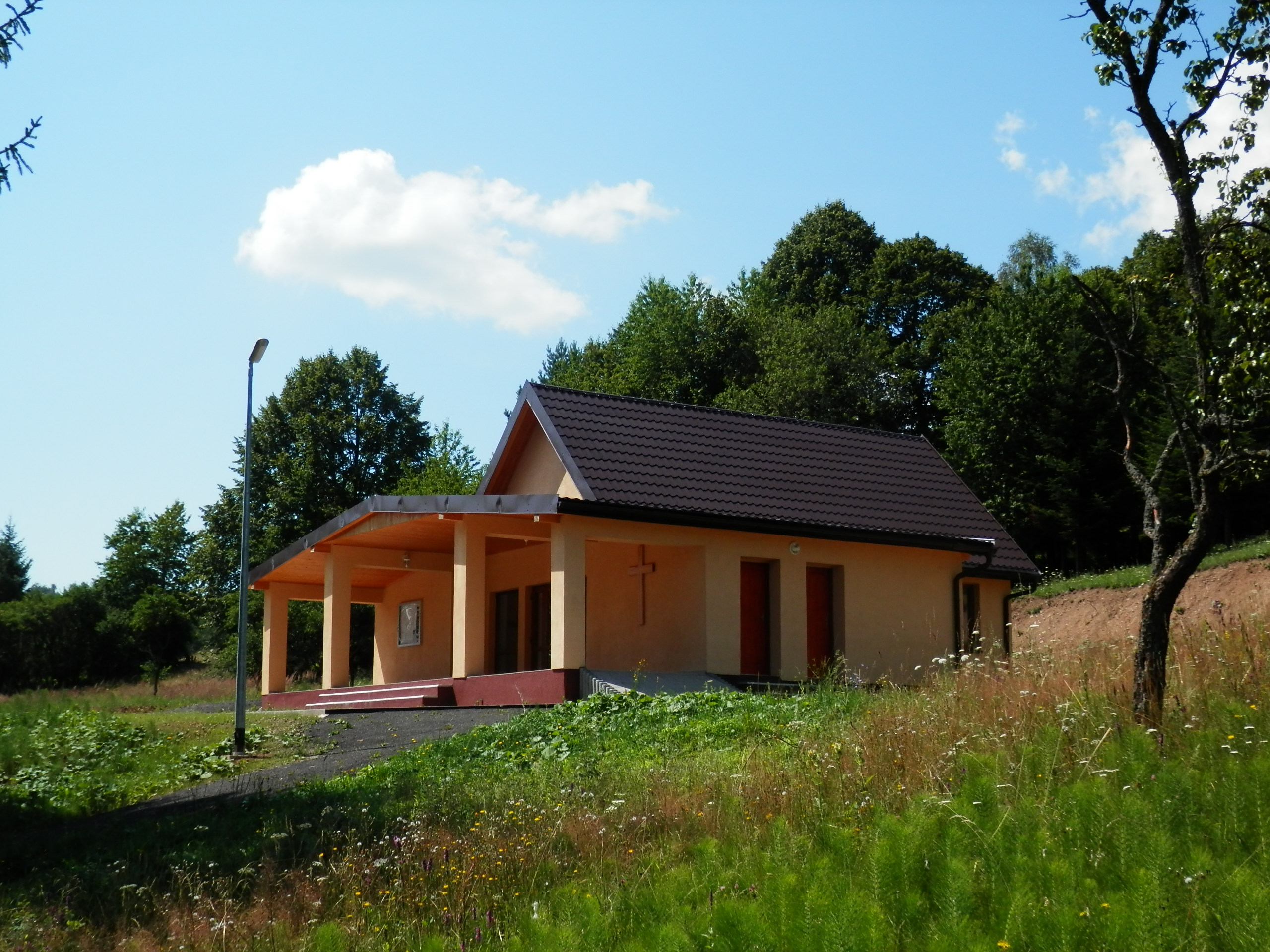
Funeral home in Kalinov

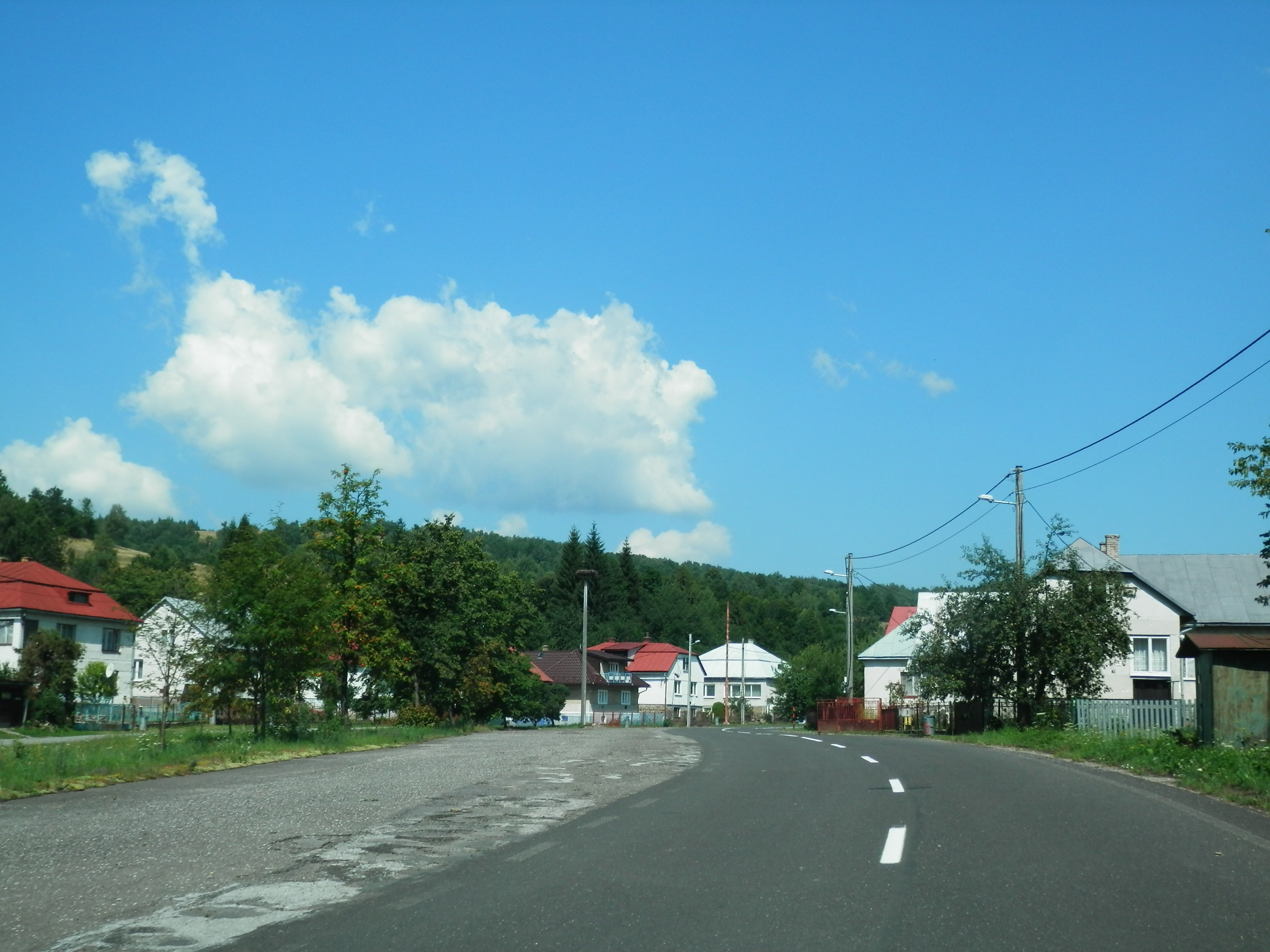
Main street in Kalinov

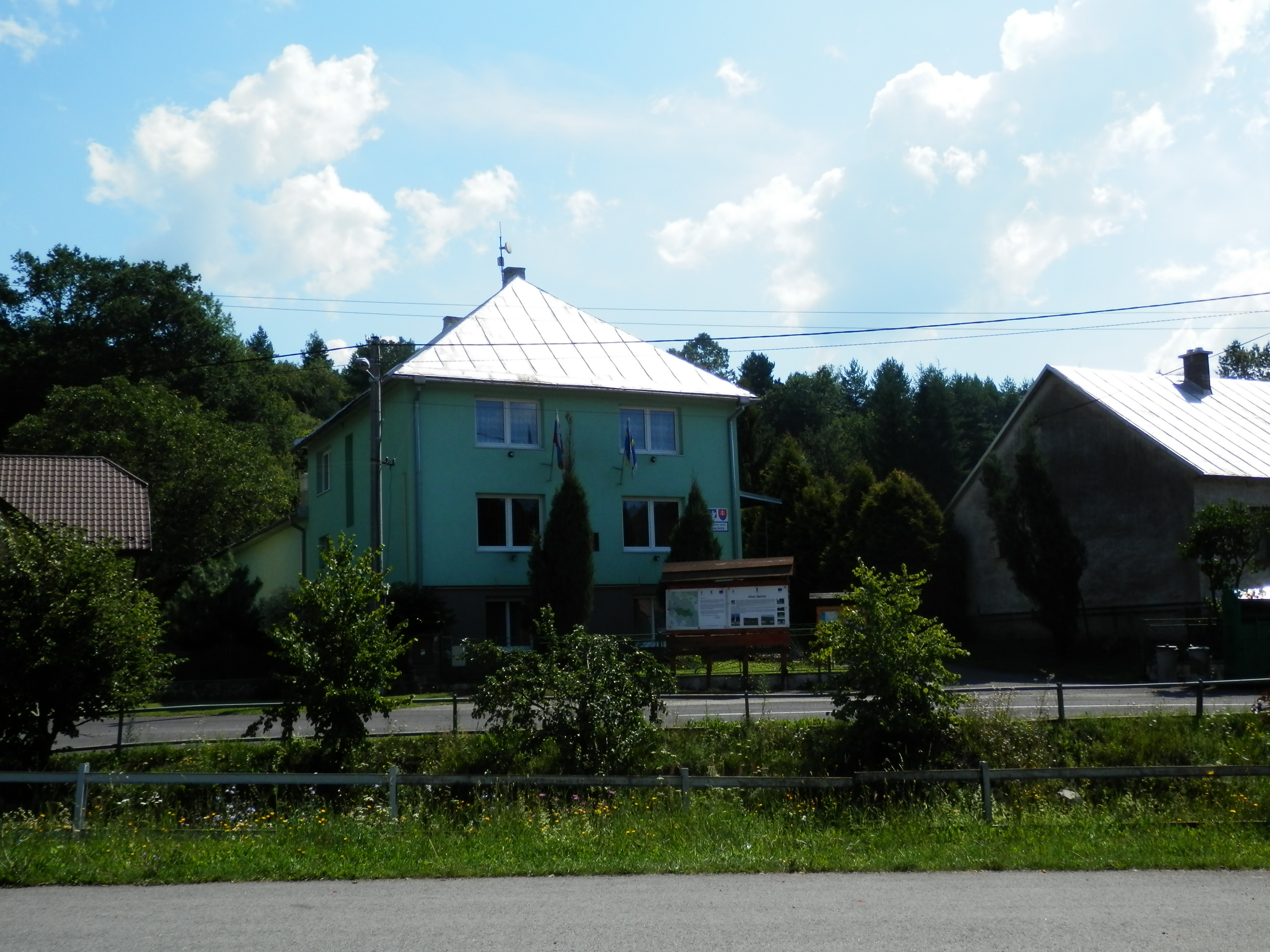
Municipal office in Kalinov

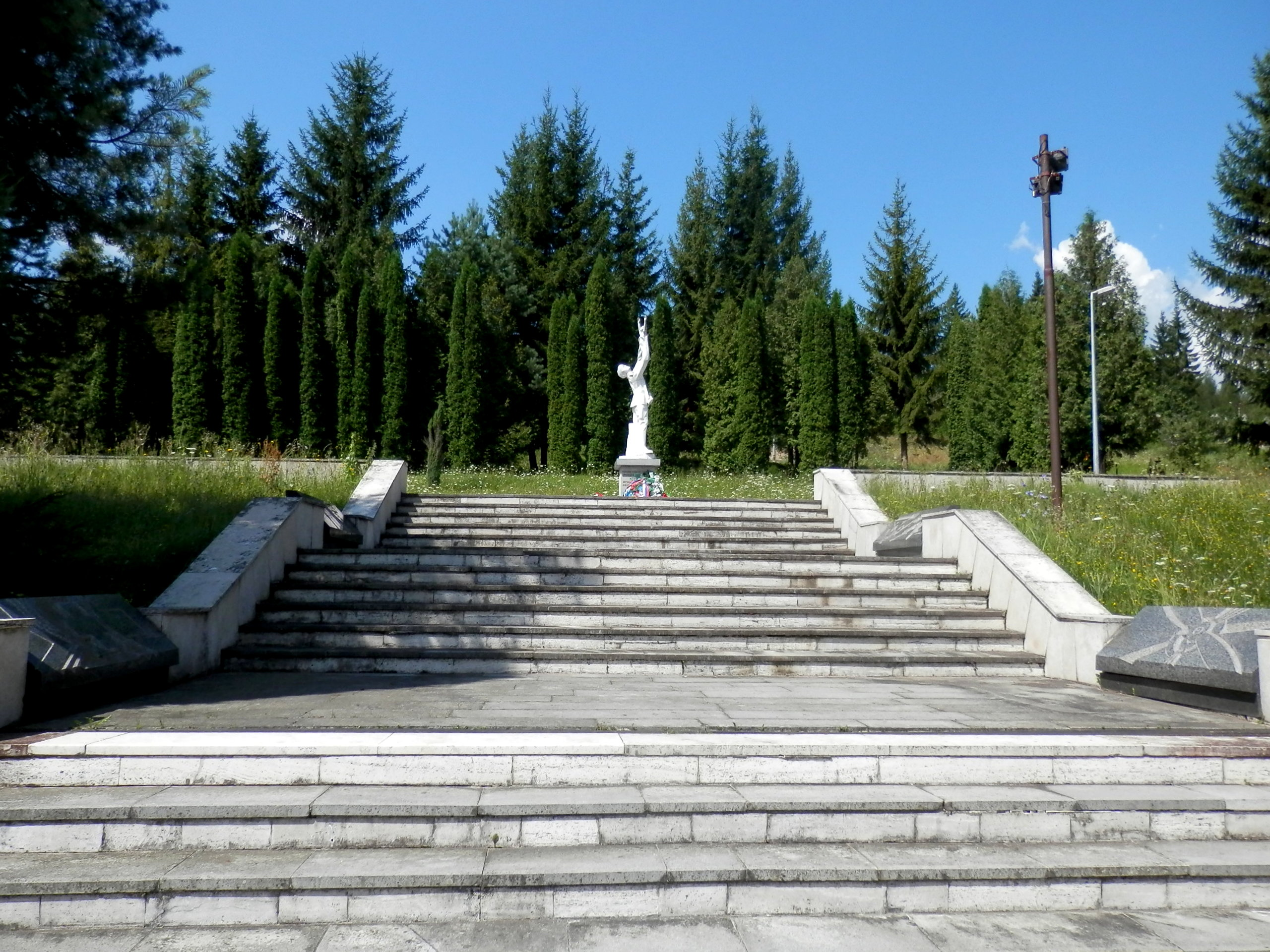
WWII liberation memorial in Kalinov

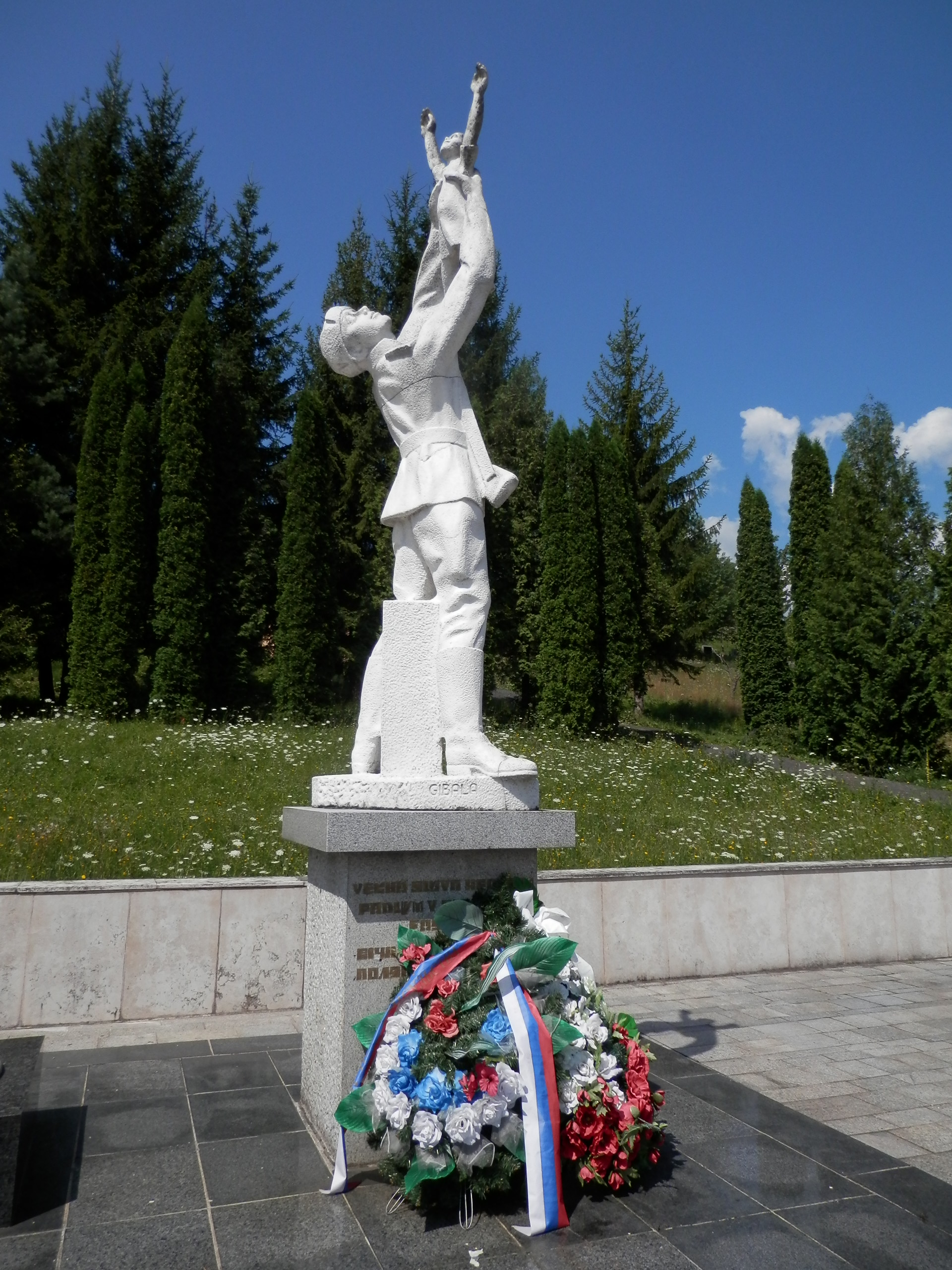
WWII liberation memorial in Kalinov

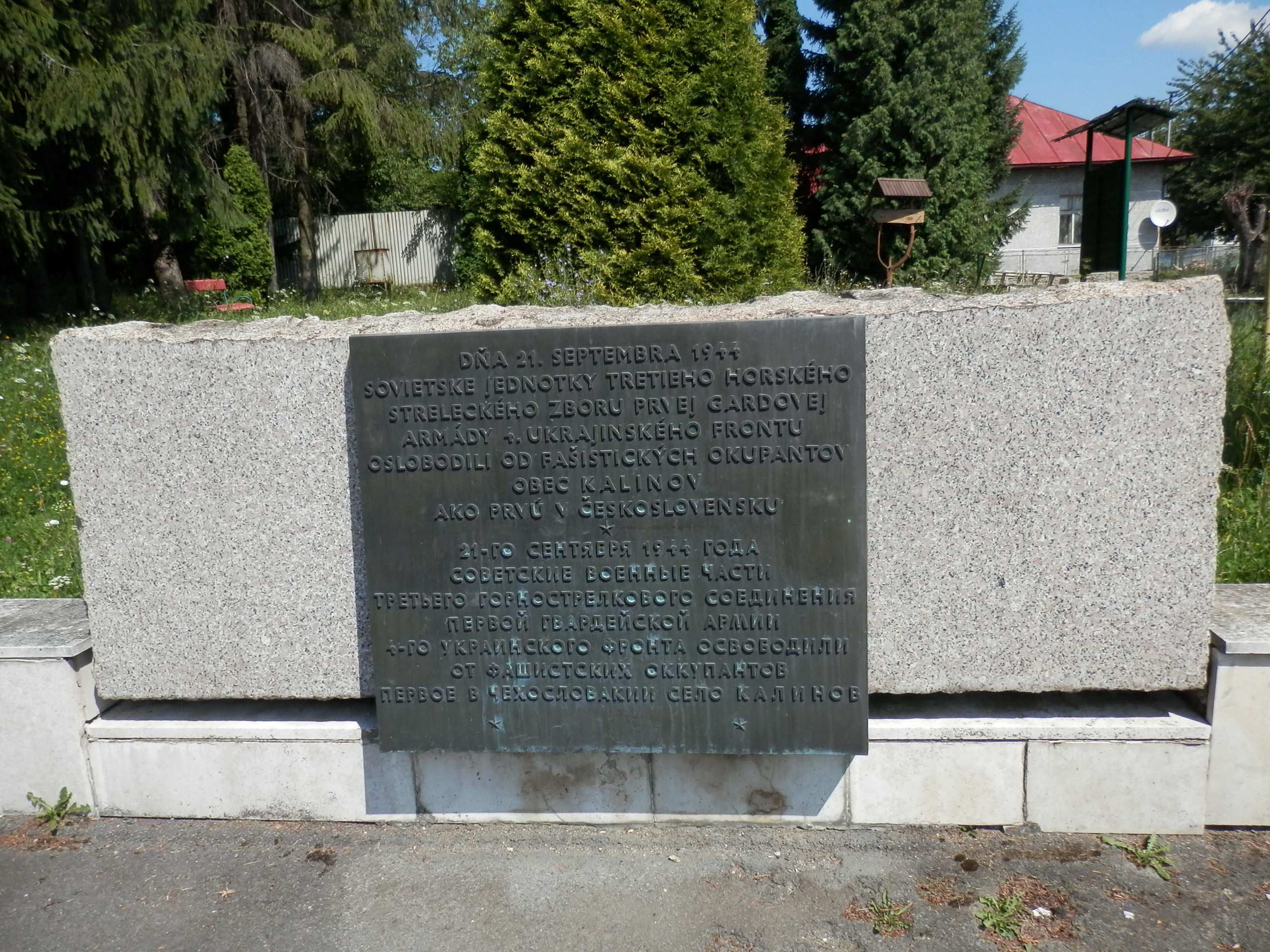
Commemorative plaque of WWII liberation memorial in Kalinov

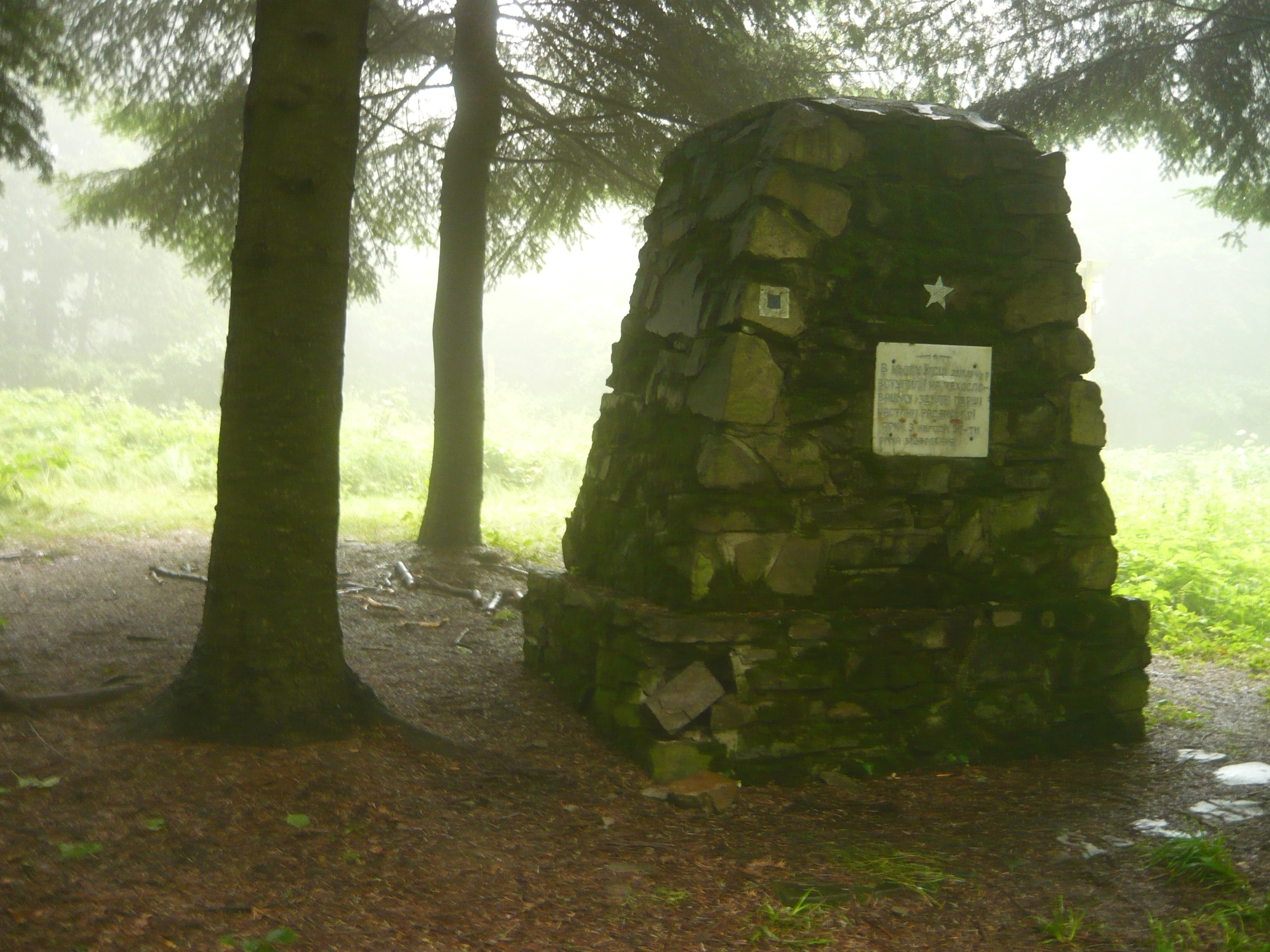
Red Army soldiers memorial in Kalinov

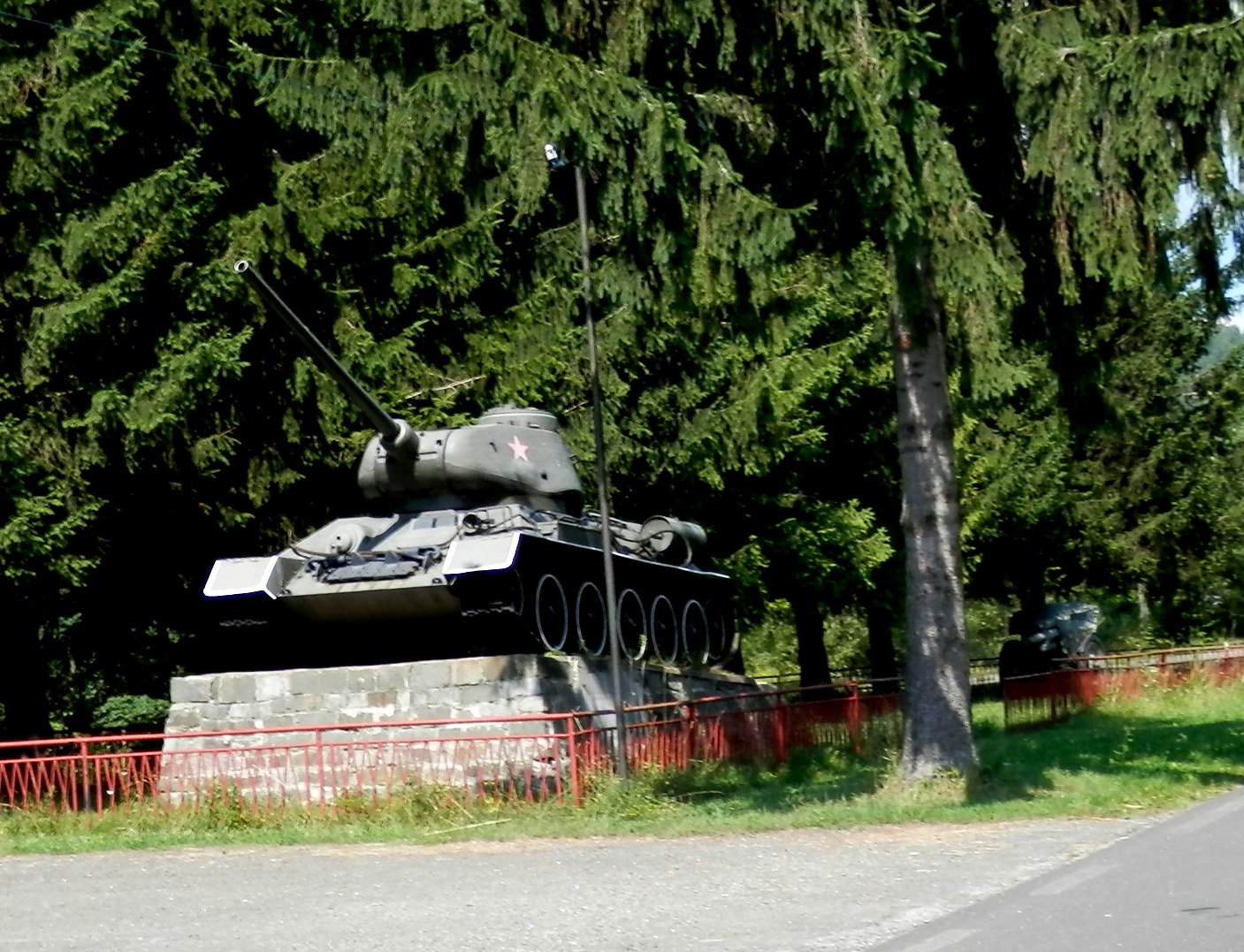
T-34 medium tank on display at WWII memorial park in Kalinov

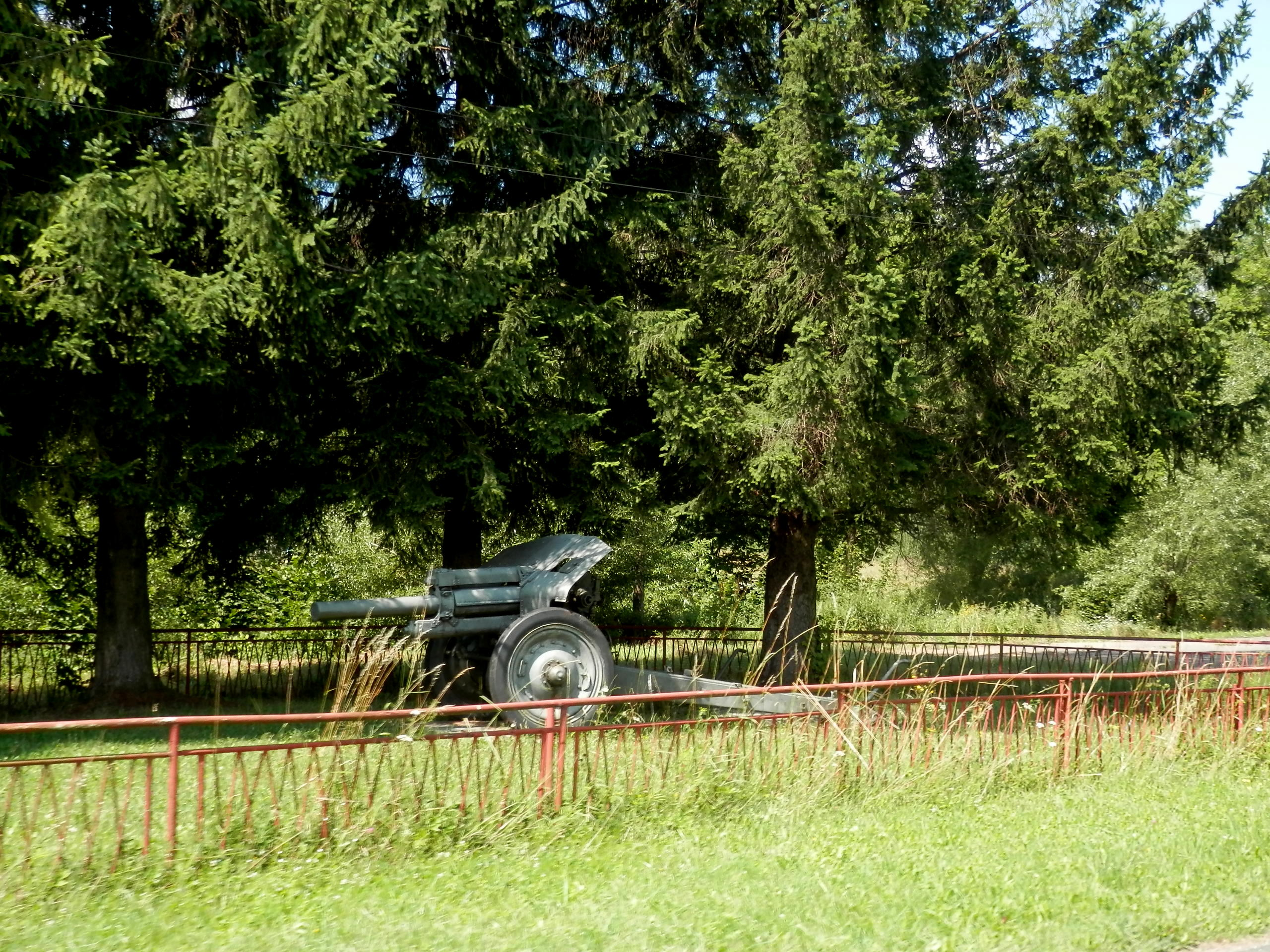
Artillery piece on display at WWII memorial park in Kalinov

== See also ==
- List of municipalities and towns in Slovakia
