= Kalyniv =

Rural locality in Lviv Oblast, Ukraine

- Village
- Location within Lviv Oblast Location within Ukraine
- Coordinates: 49°33′04″N 23°18′20″E
- Country: Ukraine
- Oblast: Lviv
- Raion: Sambir
- Area: 263.2 km^{2} (101.6 sq mi)
- Population: 441
  - Density: 1.68/km^{2} (4.34/sq mi)

Kalyniv (Ukrainian: Калинів, Russian: Калинов, German: Kaisersdorf, Polish: Kalinów) is a village (selo) in Sambir Raion, Lviv Oblast, in south-west Ukraine. It belongs to Novyi Kalyniv urban hromada, one of the hromadas of Ukraine.

The village was established in the course of Josephine colonization by German Roman Catholic settlers in 1783. In the planning process the village was to have a Catholic church built, which, however, did not happen.

From 1918 to 1939 the village was in Lwów Voivodeship in Poland. In 1940 the local German population was moved out (Heim ins Reich), later replaced by Ukrainians.

== See also ==
Kalyniv (airfield)
