= Novyi Kalyniv =

City in Lviv Oblast, Ukraine

Coordinates: 49°33′38″N 23°18′16″E

- City
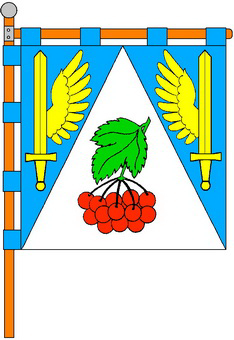
- Flag Coat of arms
- Interactive map of Novyi Kalyniv
- Country: Ukraine
- Oblast: Lviv Oblast
- Raion: Sambir Raion
- Hromada: Novyi Kalyniv urban hromada
- Founded: 1951
- City status: 2005

Area
  - Total: 2.10 km^{2} (0.81 sq mi)

Population (2022)
  - Total: 4,243
  - Density: 2,020/km^{2} (5,230/sq mi)
- Time zone: UTC+2 (EET)
  - Summer (DST): UTC+3 (EEST)
- Postal code: 81464
- Area code: +380-3236

Location in Lviv Oblast, Ukraine

Novyi Kalyniv (Ukrainian: Новий Калинів, IPA: [noˈwɪj kɐˈlɪn⁽ʲ⁾iu̯]) is a small city in Sambir Raion (district), Lviv Oblast (region) of Ukraine. Novyi Kalyniv hosts the administration of Novyi Kalyniv urban hromada, one of the hromadas of Ukraine.

The population of the city is 4,243 (2022 estimate). Local government — Novyi Kalyniv city council.

== History ==
The city was built in 1951, as a military settlement for the Soviet airbase Novy Kalinov. It received the status of a city in 2005 (Resolution of the Verkhovna Rada of Ukraine No. 2686-IV dated June 21, 2005).
