= Zashkovychi =

Rural locality in Lviv Oblast, Ukraine

Zashkovychi Зашковичі
- Village
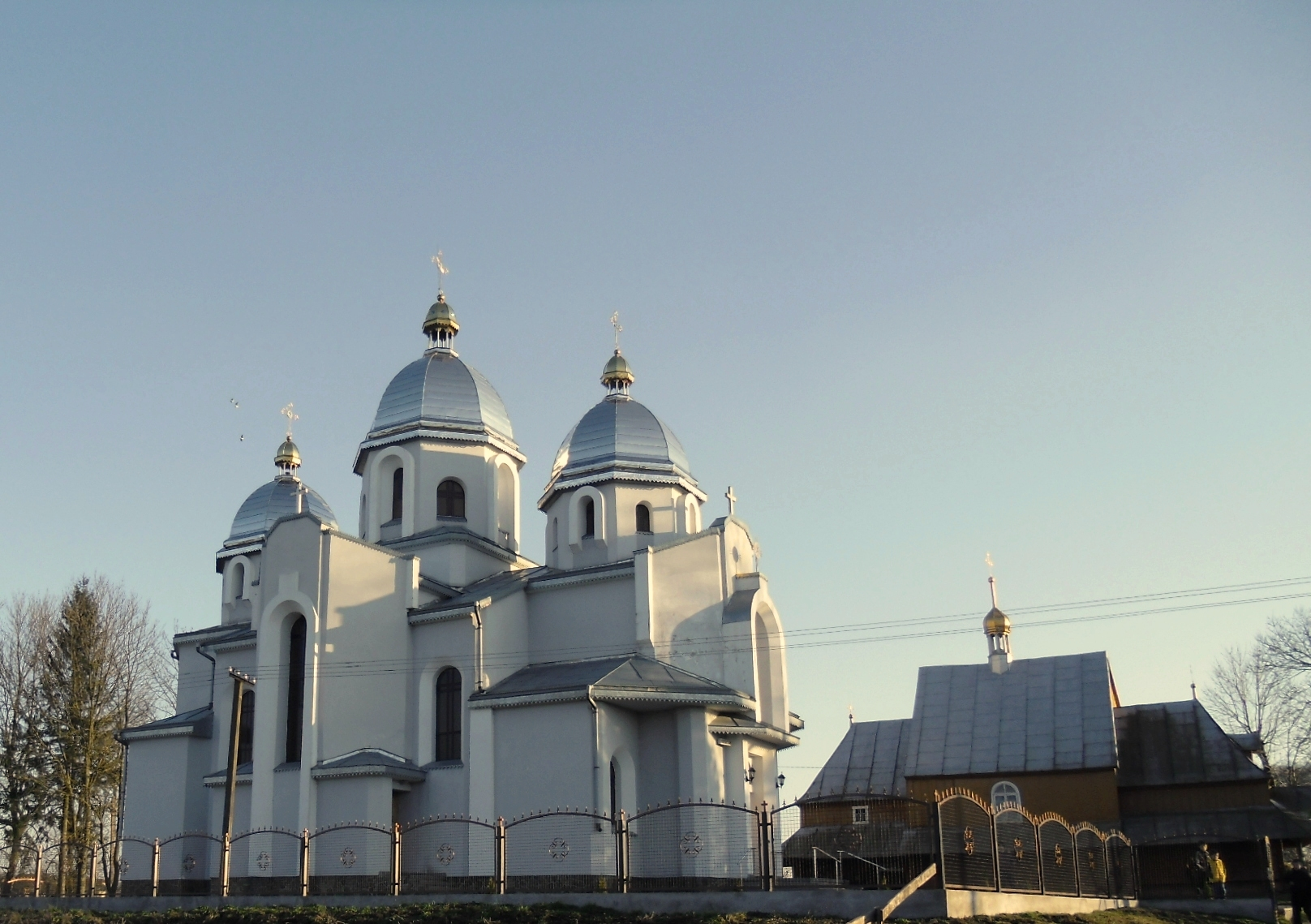
- Church of St. of Elijah in Zashkovychi

- Location within Lviv Oblast
- Coordinates: 49°40′59″N 23°39′40″E
- Country: Ukraine
- Oblast: Lviv Oblast
- District: Lviv Raion
- Established: 1571

Area
  - Total: 214 km^{2} (83 sq mi)
- Elevation /(average value of): 270 m (890 ft)

Population
  - Total: 295
  - Density: 25,794/km^{2} (66,810/sq mi)
- Time zone: UTC+2 (EET)
  - Summer (DST): UTC+3 (EEST)
- Postal code: 81560
- Area code: +380 3231
- Website: село Зашковичі ^{(Ukrainian)}

Zashkovychi (Ukrainian: За́шковичі) is a village (selo) in Lviv Raion, Lviv Oblast (province) of Ukraine. It belongs to Horodok urban hromada, one of the hromadas of Ukraine. The village is small and has an area of 2,14 km^{2} and population of the village is around 300 persons. Local government is administered by Zavydovytska village council.

== Geography ==
It is located in the Horodok Raion (district) at a distance of 4 kilometres (2.5 mi) from the Highway in Ukraine ( H 13) – Lviv – Sambir – Uzhhorod. A distance from Zashkovychi to the district center Horodok is 12 kilometres (7.5 mi), to the regional center of Lviv is 39 kilometres (24 mi) and 8 kilometres (5.0 mi) to the Komarno.

== History ==
About the village Zashkovychi in writing first mention exists of 1571.

Until 18 July 2020, Zashkovychi belonged to Horodok Raion. The raion was abolished in July 2020 as part of the administrative reform of Ukraine, which reduced the number of raions of Lviv Oblast to seven. The area of Horodok Raion was merged into Lviv Raion.

== Cult constructions and religion ==
In the village there are the Saint prophet Elijah church (Wooden church, 1830). The church occasionally is used to celebrations. Local architectural monument of Horodok Raion (1571-М).
The new church of St. of Elijah (stone) is built beside.

== Gallery ==
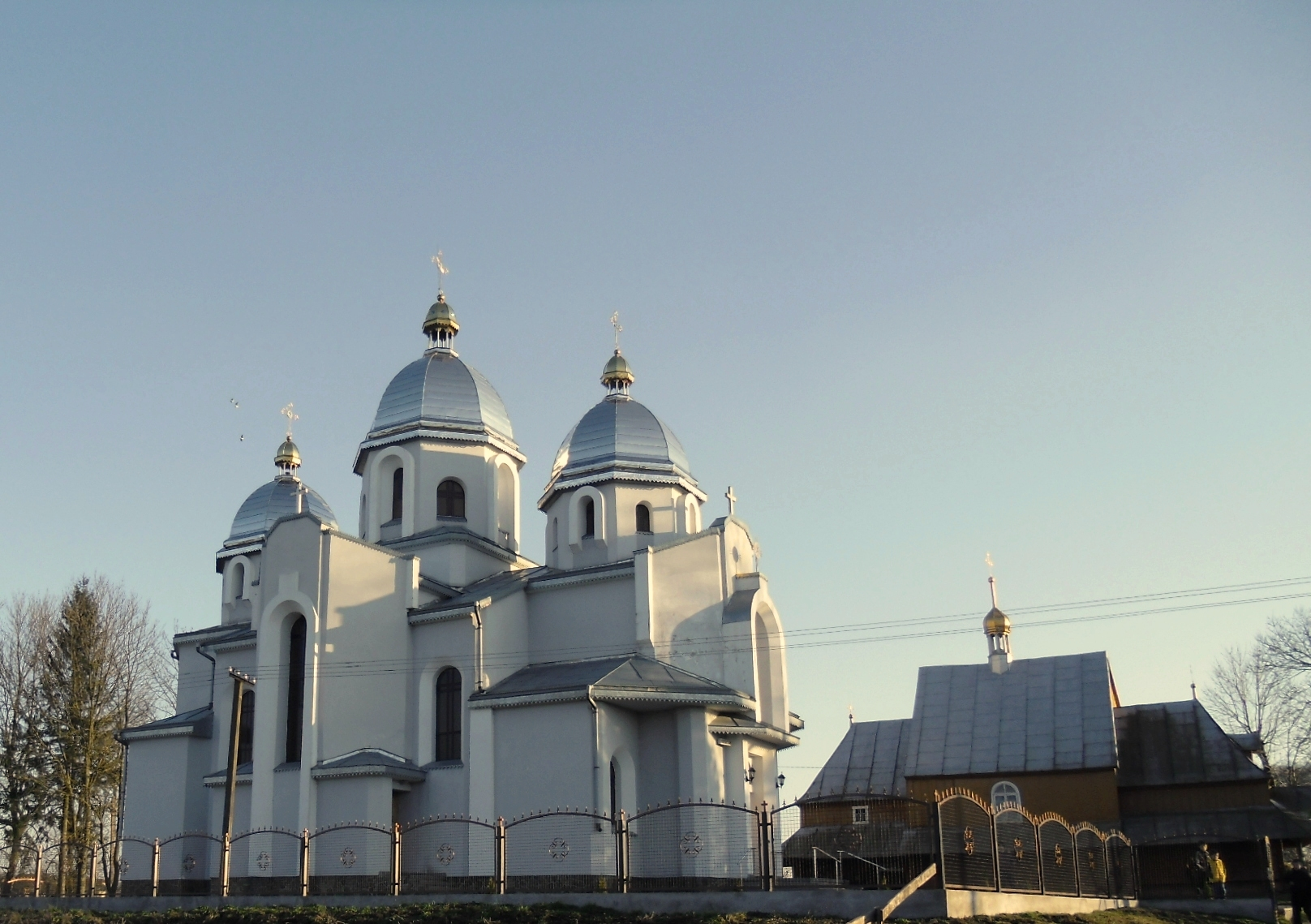
Church of St. of Elijah (stone).

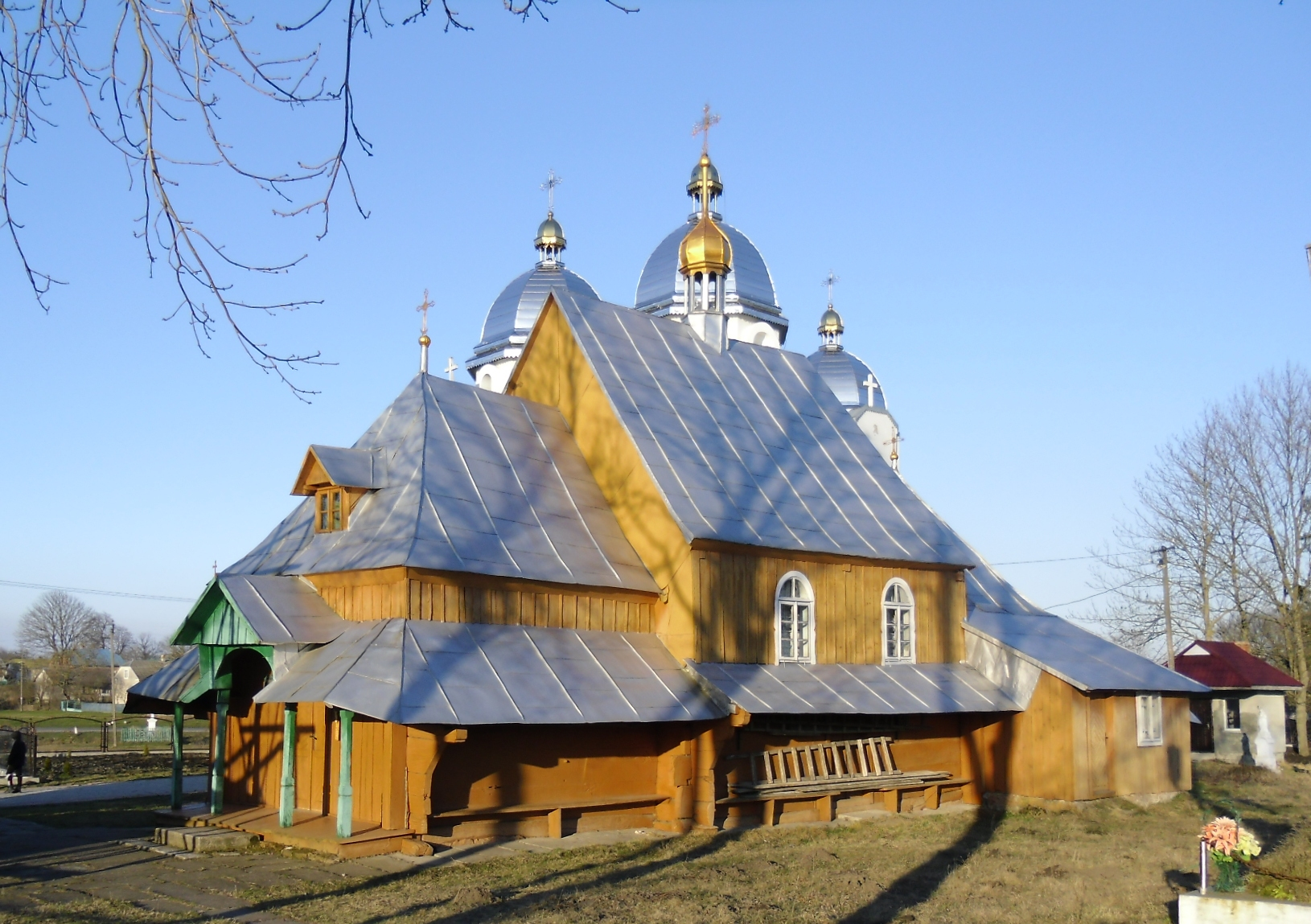
Saint prophet Elijah church (Wooden church, 1830).
