= Vovchukhy =

Rural locality in Lviv Oblast, Ukraine

Vovchukhy Вовчухи
- Village
- Location within Lviv Oblast
- Coordinates: 49°46′57″N 23°31′47″E
- Country: Ukraine
- Oblast (province): Lviv Oblast
- Raion (district): Lviv Raion
- Hromada (municipality): Horodok urban hromada
- Established: 1428

Area
  - Total: 2,310 km^{2} (890 sq mi)
- Elevation: 262 m (860 ft)

Population
  - Total: 747
  - Density: 0.323/km^{2} (0.838/sq mi)
- Time zone: UTC+2 (EET)
  - Summer (DST): UTC+3 (EEST)
- Postal code: 81506
- Area code: +380 3231
- Website: село Вовчухи (in Ukrainian)

Vovchukhy (Ukrainian: Вовчу́хи, Polish: Wołczuchy) is a village (selo) in Lviv Raion, Lviv Oblast (province) of Ukraine. It belongs to Horodok urban hromada, one of the hromadas of Ukraine. The population of the village is just about 747 people.

== Geography ==
The village is surrounded by Dobrjany, Dolyniany, Rodatychi and Bratkovychi. It is located at a distance of 2 kilometres (1.2 mi) from the highway in Ukraine M 11 connecting Lviv with Przemyśl. Near the village passes railway from Lviv to Przemyśl in Poland. A distance from Kernytsia to the district center Horodok is 10 kilometres (6.2 mi), to the regional center of Lviv is 40 kilometres (25 mi) and 51 kilometres (32 mi) to Przemyśl.

== History and Attractions ==
The village was founded in 1428.

Until 18 July 2020, Vovchukhy belonged to Horodok Raion. The raion was abolished in July 2020 as part of the administrative reform of Ukraine, which reduced the number of raions of Lviv Oblast to seven. The area of Horodok Raion was merged into Lviv Raion.

The village has attractions of monumental art of Horodok Raion – a monument to Ivan Franko, and the priest Zahayevych. In the village there is a monument to Taras Shevchenko, a monument to Ukrainian Sich Riflemen.

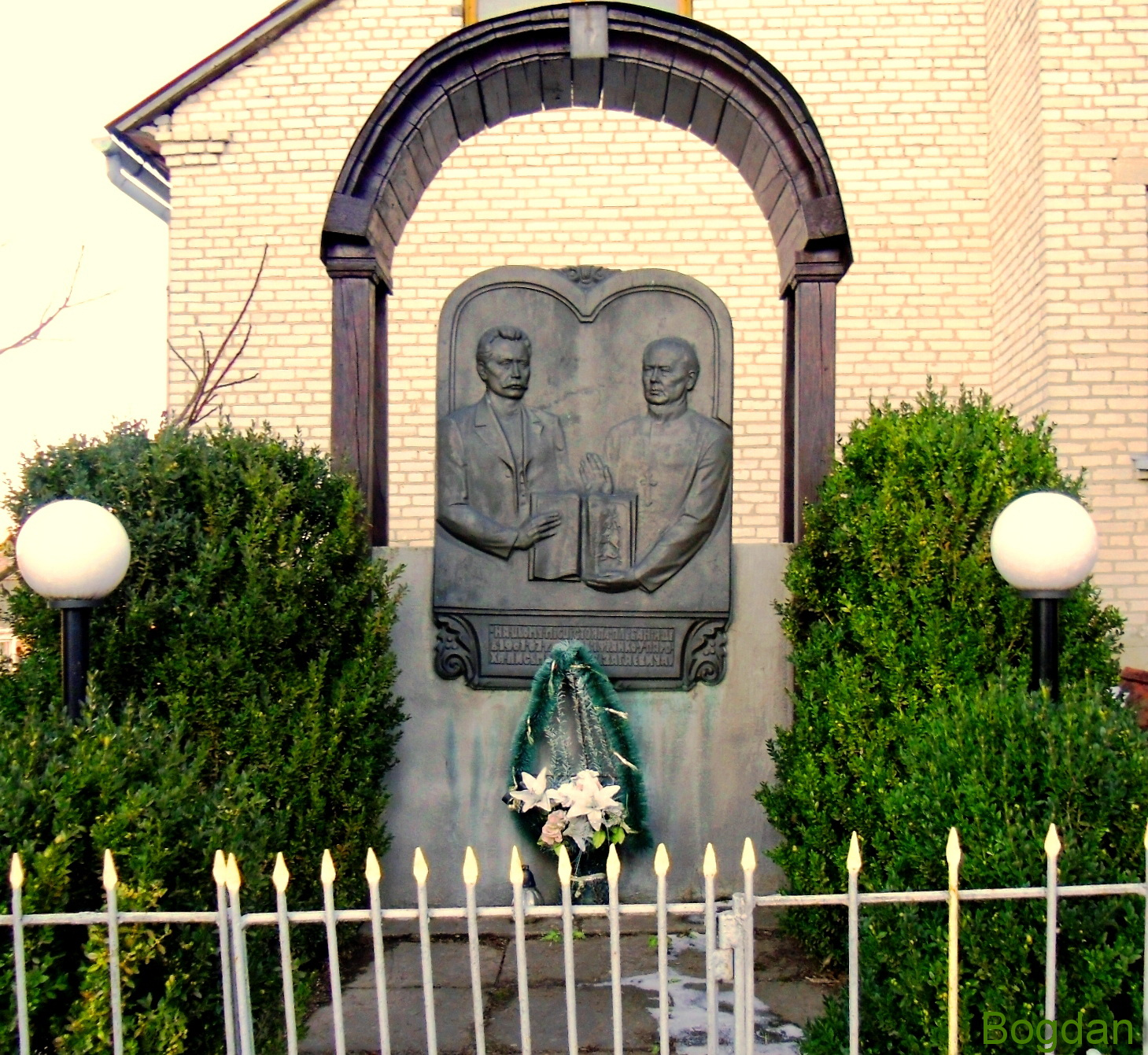
The Monument of Ivan Franko and the priest Vasyl Zahayevych

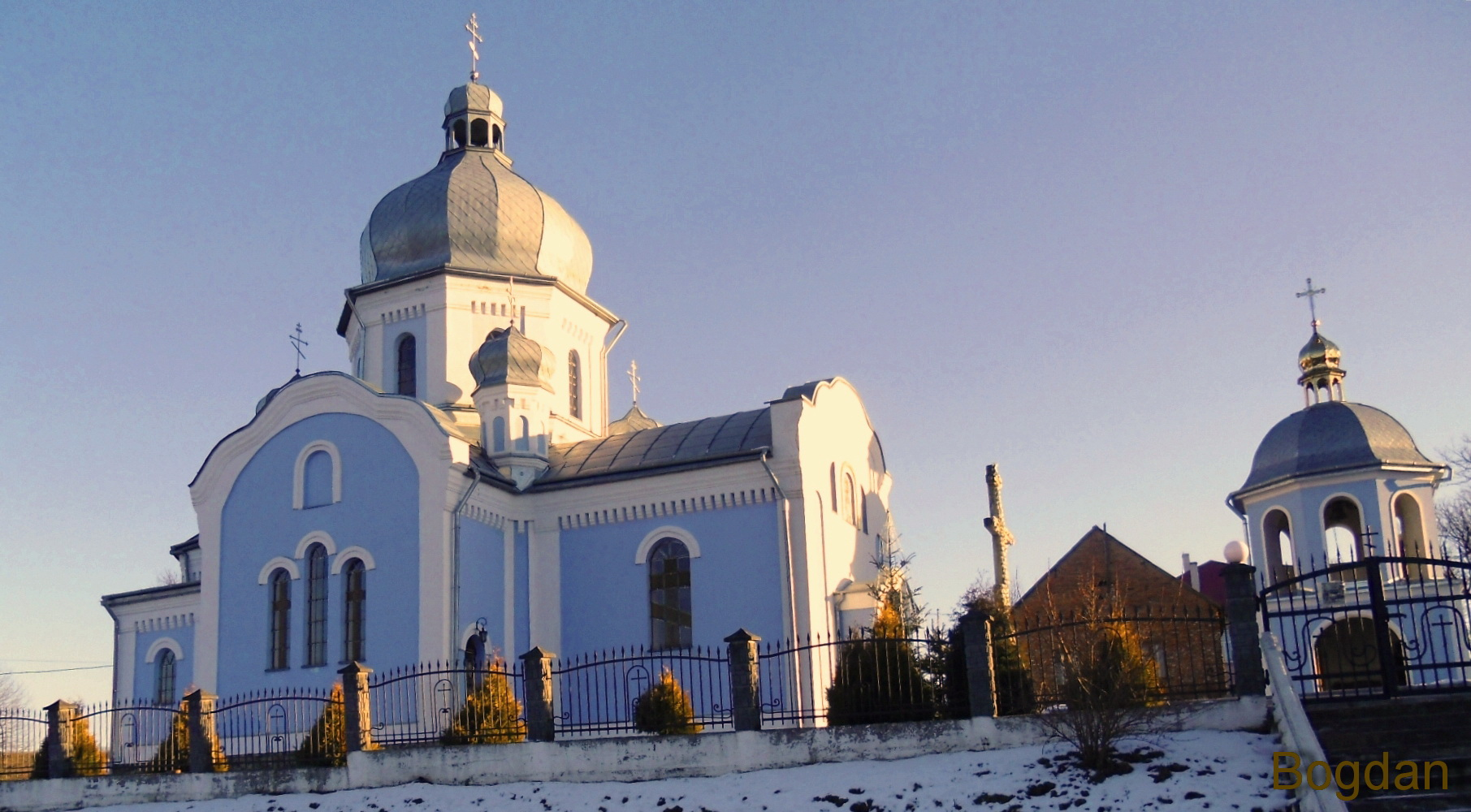
A newly built Church of the Epiphany

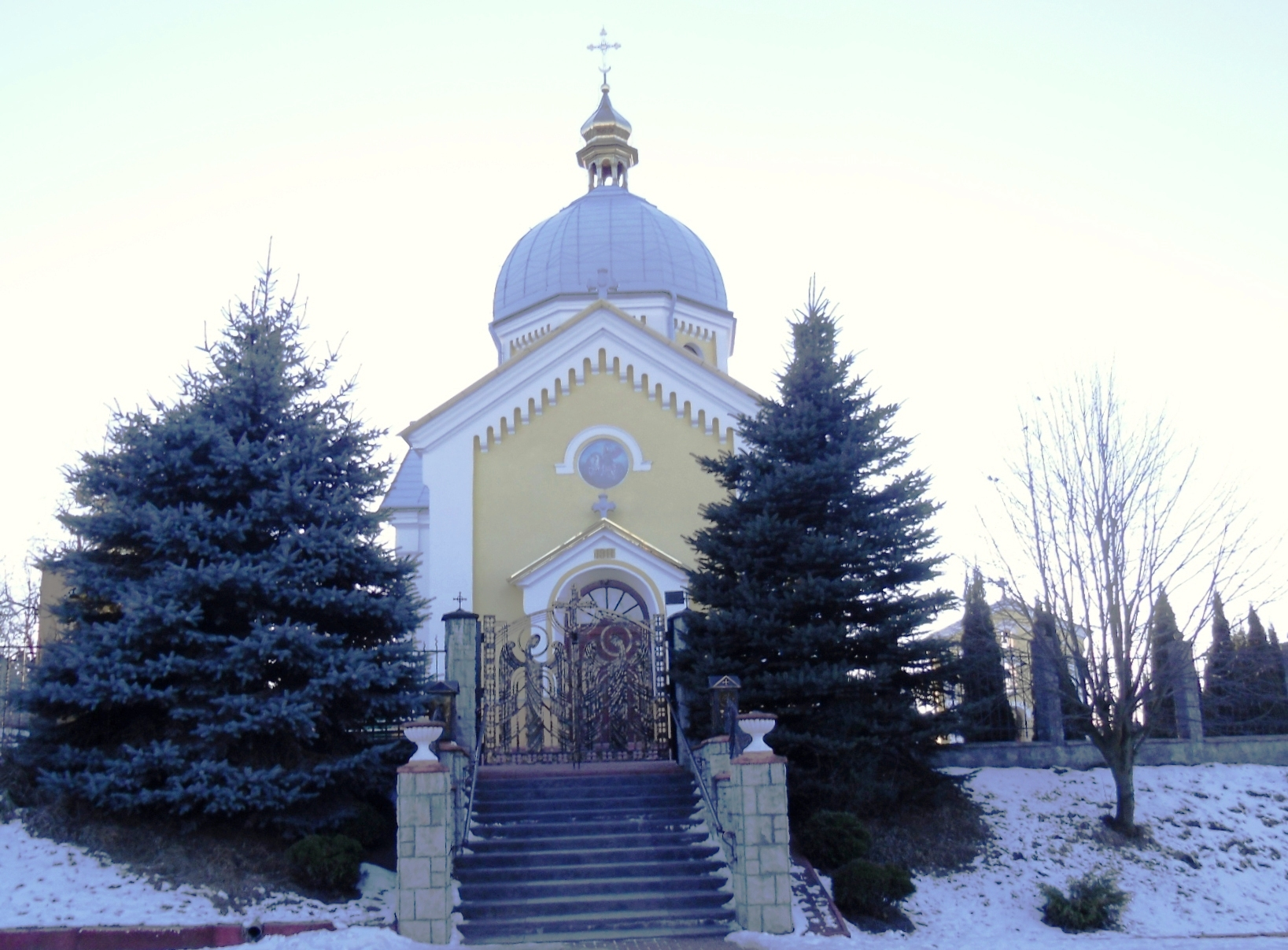
The Parish Church of St George in the village Vovchukhy

== Personalities ==
- Vasyl Otkovych (1950–2017), Ukrainian art historian and museum worker.
- Vasyl Zahaievych (1866–1948), Ukrainian writer, educator. The priest of the Greek Catholic Church, the pastor of the village Vovchukhy. A close associate of Ivan Franko.
