= Artyshchiv =

Rural locality in Lviv Oblast, Ukraine

Artyschiv Артищів
- Village
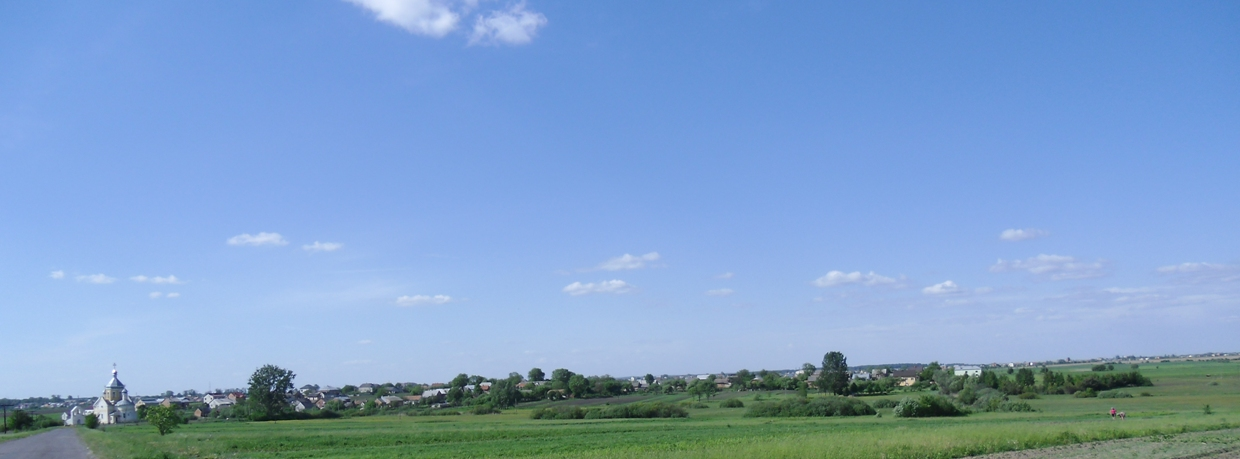

- Location within Lviv Oblast
- Coordinates: 49°46′00″N 23°40′33″E
- Country: Ukraine
- Oblast: Lviv Oblast
- District: Lviv Raion
- Established: 1490

Area
  - Total: 0,347 km^{2} (134 sq mi)
- Elevation /(average value of): 273 m (896 ft)

Population
  - Total: 336
  - Density: 0.968/km^{2} (2.51/sq mi)
- Time zone: UTC+2 (EET)
  - Summer (DST): UTC+3 (EEST)
- Postal code: 81550
- Area code: +380 3231
- Website: село Артищів ^{(Ukrainian)}

Artyshchiv (Ukrainian: Арти́щів)–- village (selo) in Lviv Raion, Lviv Oblast (province) of western Ukraine. It belongs to Horodok urban hromada, one of the hromadas of Ukraine. Population of the village is around 336 persons. Local government – Kernytska village council.

== Geography ==
The village Artyschiv is placed along the way Horodok - Velykyi Liubin at a distance of 4 kilometres (2.5 mi) from the district center Horodok. It is 28 kilometres (17 mi) from the regional center of Lviv and 7 kilometres (4.3 mi) from the urban-type Velykyi Liubin.
Near the village passes highway in Ukraine M 11 connecting Lviv with Przemyśl.

== History ==
The first record of the village dates back to 1490 year.

During the First World War (in 1916) in the village settled several persons from the village Chystopady Ternopil region.

Until 18 July 2020, Artyshchiv belonged to Horodok Raion. The raion was abolished in July 2020 as part of the administrative reform of Ukraine, which reduced the number of raions of Lviv Oblast to seven. The area of Horodok Raion was merged into Lviv Raion.

== Cult constructions and religion ==
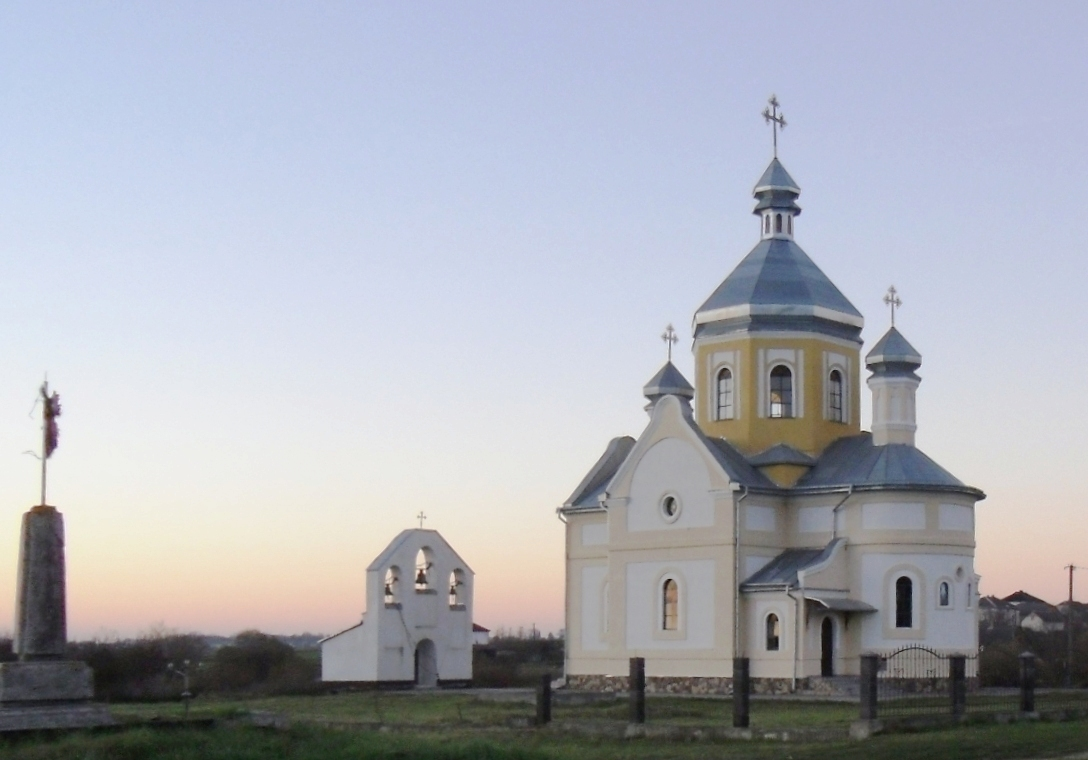
Church of the Holy Virgin

In the village was registered religious community the Church of the Intercession of the Blessed Mother (Ukrainian Greek-Catholic Church). There is a new Church of the Holy Virgin. She was consecrated on October 14, 2010.

== Literature ==
- History of Towns and Villages of the Ukrainian SSR, Lvov region. – К. : ГРУРЕ, 1968 р. (in Ukrainian)
