= Dubanevychi =

Rural locality in Lviv Oblast, Ukraine

Dubanevychi Дубаневичі
- Village
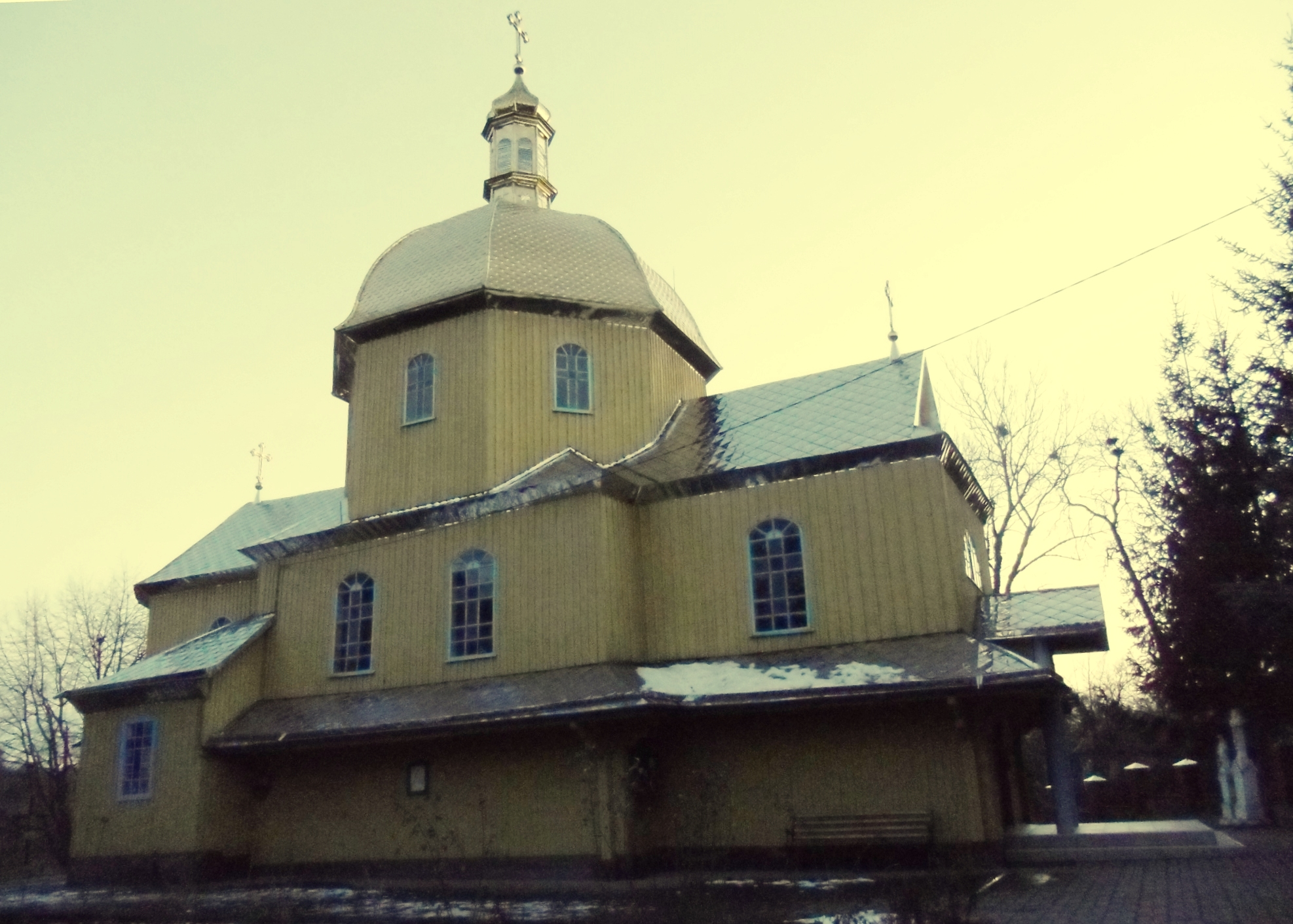
- St. Nicholas Church

- Location within Lviv Oblast
- Coordinates: 49°41′47″N 23°30′28″E
- Country: Ukraine
- Oblast: Lviv Oblast
- District: Lviv Raion
- Established: 1430

Area
  - Total: 1,175 km^{2} (454 sq mi)
- Elevation /(average value of): 277 m (909 ft)

Population
  - Total: 1,277
  - Density: 1.087/km^{2} (2.815/sq mi)
- Time zone: UTC+2 (EET)
  - Summer (DST): UTC+3 (EEST)
- Postal code: 81540
- Area code: +380 3231
- Website: село Дубаневичі / райцентр Городок / облцентр Львів ^{(Ukrainian)}

Dubanevychi (Ukrainian: Дубане́вичі) is a village in Lviv Raion, Lviv Oblast in western Ukraine. It belongs to Horodok urban hromada, one of the hromadas of Ukraine. The population of the village is about 1277 people. Local government is administered by Dubanevytska village council.

== Geography ==
The village is located at a distance of 2 kilometres (1.2 mi) from the roads Highway H13 (Ukraine) ( H 13) from Lviv to Uzhhorod and is located at a distance of 20 kilometres (12 mi) from the district center of Horodok, 46 kilometres (29 mi) from the regional center of Lviv and 32 kilometres (20 mi) from the town of Sambir.
And this village is located on the altitude of 277 metres (910 ft) above sea level.
In territory of village and surrounding area is dominated by gray forest soils, black soils. The village is surrounded by coniferous and deciduous forests and the average January temperature at −4 °C (25 °F), and July–- 18 °C (64 °F)

== History ==
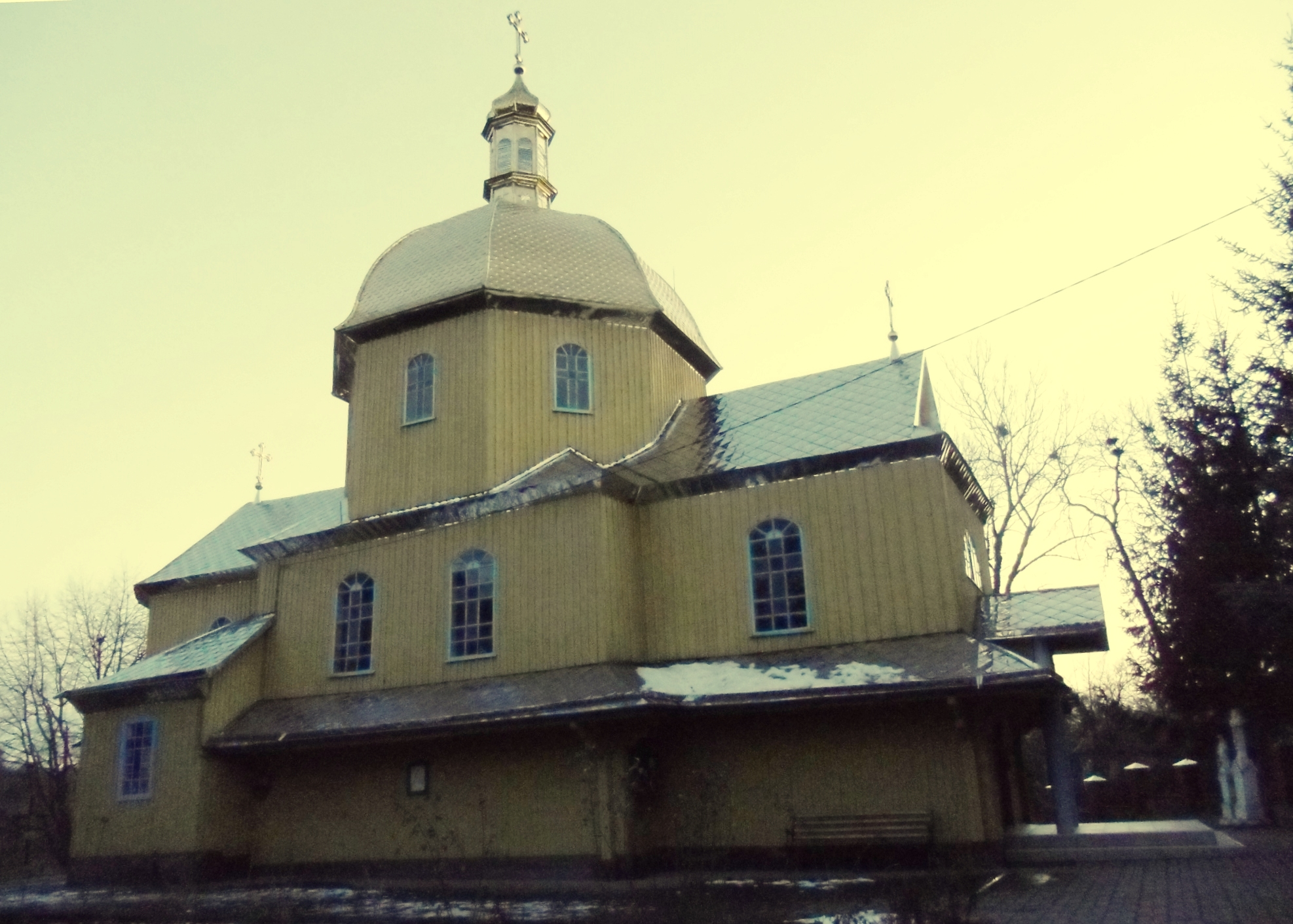
St. Nicholas church 1880. Dubanevychi.

The date of establishment the village is considered 1430. But the first mention of the village in a document dating from 1266 – 1301 years.

In 1870 Mary Fredro has allocated wood and hired of masters to build the church, which was consecrated in 1880 (1892) year.

Until 18 July 2020, Dubanevychi belonged to Horodok Raion. The raion was abolished in July 2020 as part of the administrative reform of Ukraine, which reduced the number of raions of Lviv Oblast to seven. The area of Horodok Raion was merged into Lviv Raion.

== Cult constructions and religion ==
In the village there is a wooden church of St. Nicholas (1870-1892), wooden belfry (1845?) and sculptures of St. John and the Mother of God.

== Personalities ==
- Mary (Maria) Fredro (1862 – 1937)–- the owner of the village the late 19th century, was the sponsor for the construction of the church of St. Nicholas (1870-1892).

== Literature ==
- (in Russian)СОФИЯ ИЗ ФРЕДРО ШЕПТИЦКАЯ. МОЛОДОСТЬ И ПРИЗВАНИЕ о. РОМАНА ШЕПТИЦКОГО. Львов. Издавтельство “Свічадо”. 2009
