= Sukhovolia, Lviv Raion, Lviv Oblast =

Rural locality in Lviv Oblast, Ukraine

Sukhovolia
- Village
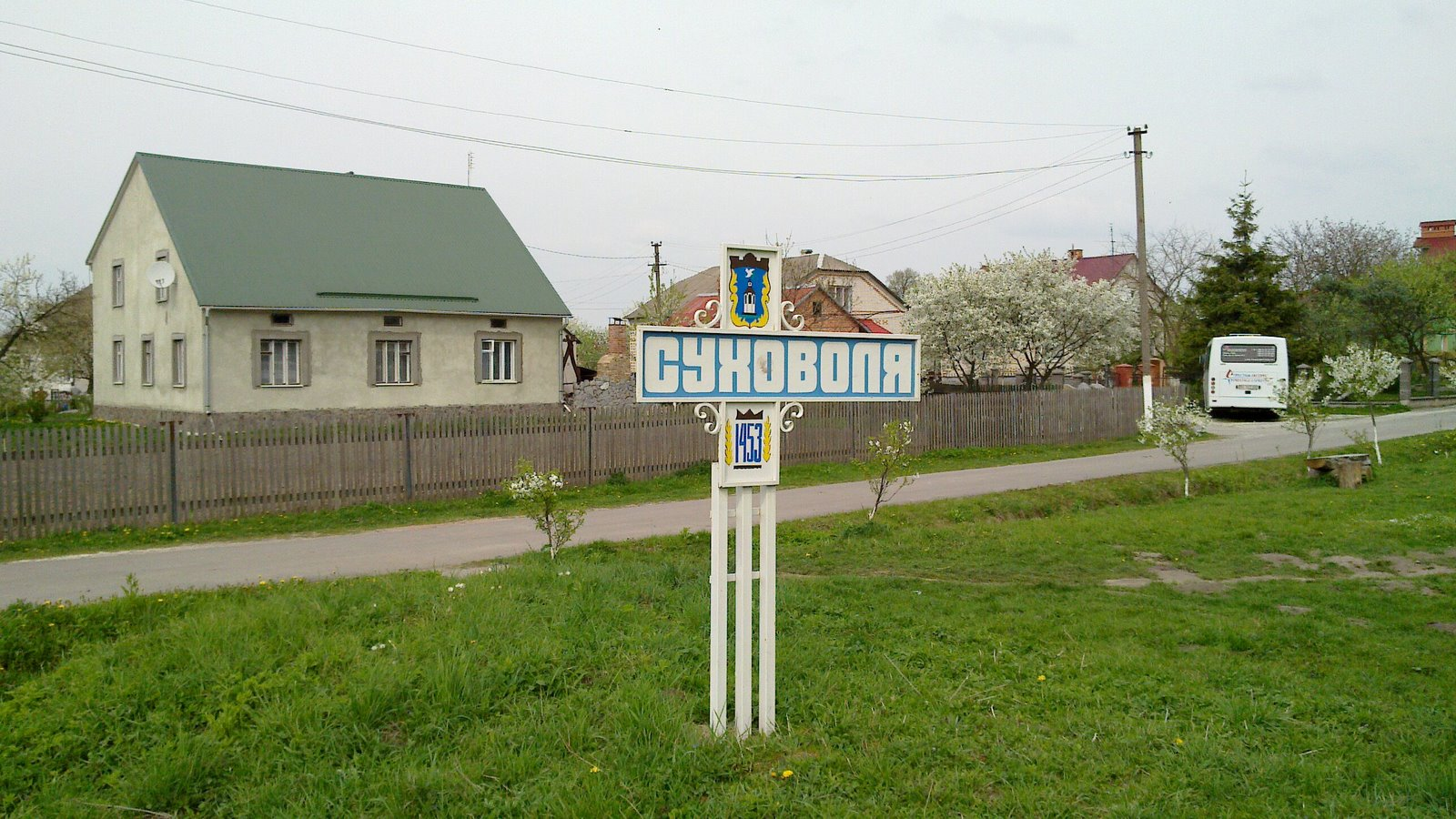

- Location within Lviv Oblast Location within Ukraine
- Coordinates: 49°49′44″N 23°50′17″E
- Country: Ukraine
- Oblast: Lviv
- Raion: Lviv
- Hromada: Zymna Voda
- Area: 9.52 km^{2} (3.68 sq mi)
- Elevation: 303 m (994 ft)
- Population: 4,100

Sukhovolia (Ukrainian: Суховоля; Polish: Suchowola) is a village (selo) in Lviv Raion, Lviv Oblast, in western Ukraine. It belongs to Zymna Voda rural hromada, one of the hromadas of Ukraine.

Until 18 July 2020, Sukhovolia belonged to Horodok Raion. The raion was abolished in July 2020 as part of the administrative reform of Ukraine, which reduced the number of raions of Lviv Oblast to seven. The area of Horodok Raion was merged into Lviv Raion.
