= Kernytsia =

Rural locality in Lviv Oblast, Ukraine

Kernytsia Керниця
- Village
- Location within Lviv Oblast Location within Ukraine
- Coordinates: 49°46′52″N 23°45′20″E
- Country: Ukraine
- Oblast: Lviv Oblast
- Raion: Lviv Raion
- Hromada: Horodok urban hromada
- Established: 1465

Area
  - Total: 1,655 km^{2} (639 sq mi)
- Elevation /(average value of): 281 m (922 ft)

Population
  - Total: 1,500
  - Density: 9,063/km^{2} (23,470/sq mi)
- Time zone: UTC+2 (EET)
  - Summer (DST): UTC+3 (EEST)
- Postal code: 81550
- Area code: +380 3231
- Website: селище Керниця ^{(Ukrainian)}

Kernytsia (Ukrainian: Керниця) is a village in Lviv Raion, Lviv Oblast, of Western Ukraine. Chuchenosy villages name has been in antiquities. The modern name of village was constituted in 1780. It belongs to Horodok urban hromada, one of the hromadas of Ukraine. Local government is administered by Kernytsia Village Council.

== Geography ==
The village is located at a distance of 3 kilometres (1.9 mi) from the highway in Ukraine M 11 connecting Lviv with Przemyśl. A distance from Kernytsia to Horodok is 8 kilometres (5.0 mi), to the regional center of Lviv is 28 kilometres (17 mi) and 75 kilometres (47 mi) to Przemyśl.

== History and Attractions ==
The first mention of Kernytsia dates from the year 1465. On the territory of village was a German colony Brundorf before World War II. The village was burned during World War II.

Until 18 July 2020, Kernytsia belonged to Horodok Raion. The raion was abolished in July 2020 as part of the administrative reform of Ukraine, which reduced the number of raions of Lviv Oblast to seven. The area of Horodok Raion was merged into Lviv Raion.

The village has an architectural monument of local importance of the former Horodok Raion – Church of the Exaltation of the Cross 1888 (1572 –м).

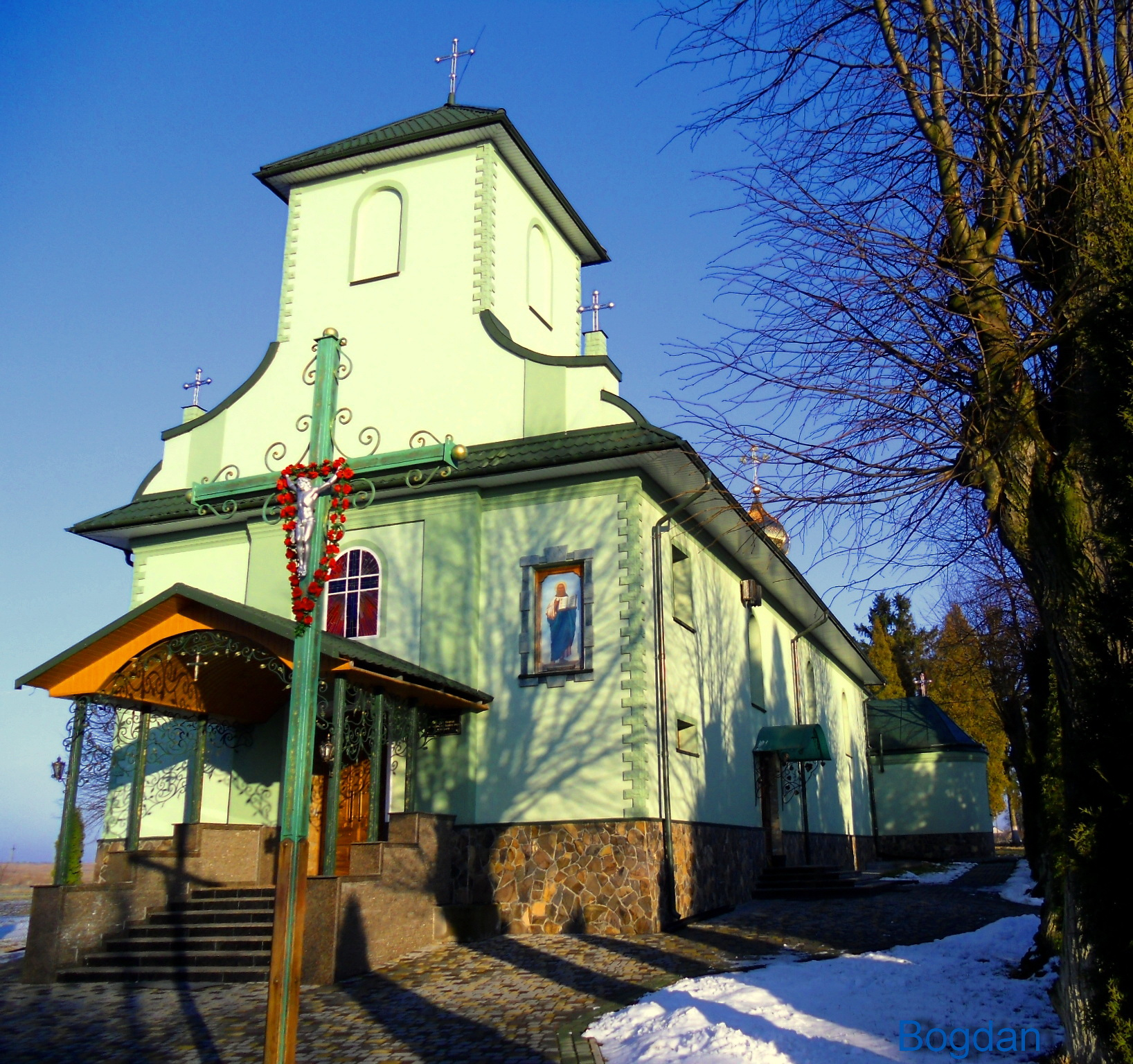
Exaltation of the Holy Cross Church (1888)

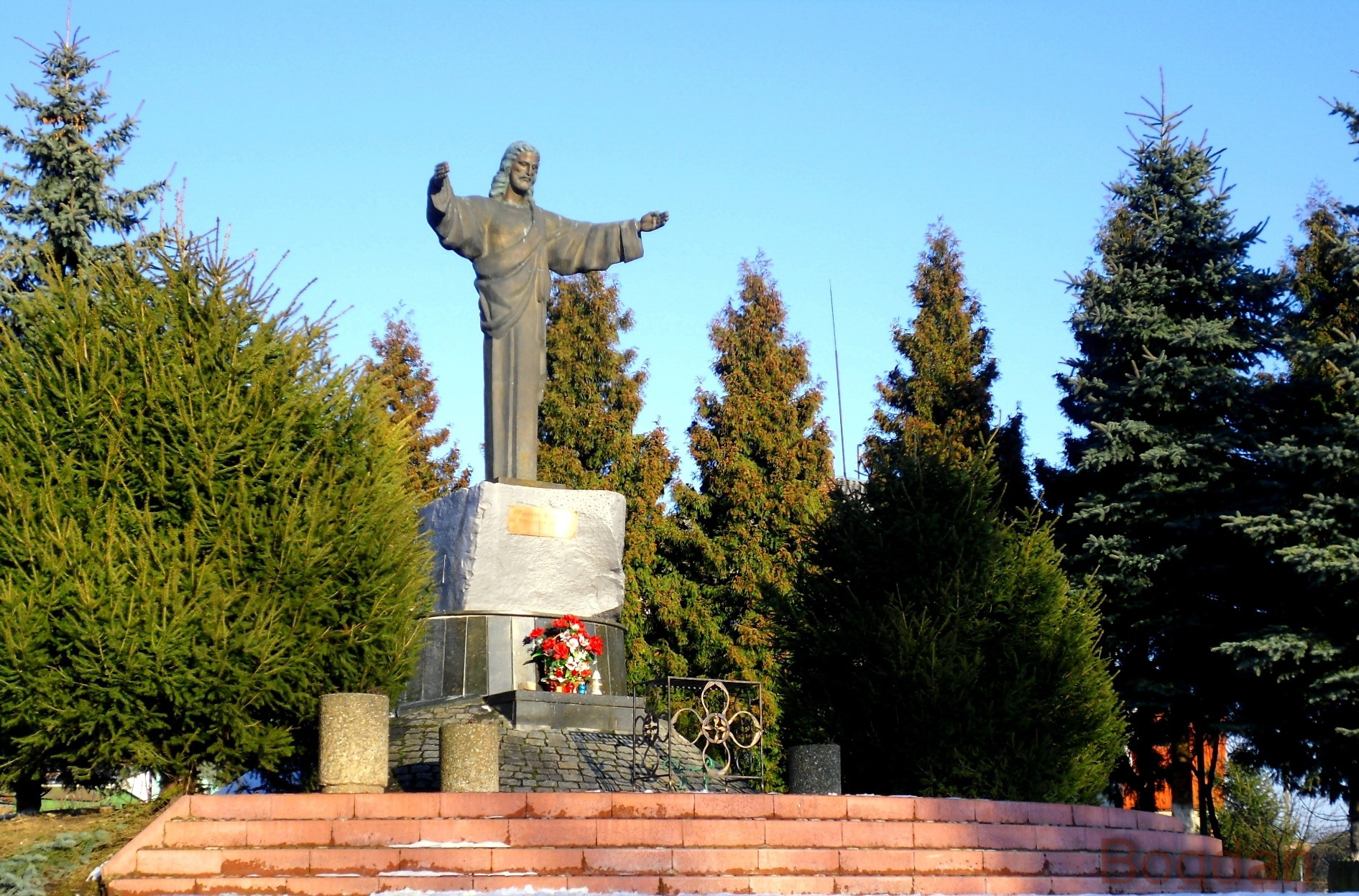
Statue of Jesus Christ

== Literature ==
- Ukrainian: Історія міст і сіл УРСР : Львівська область. – К. : ГРУРЕ, 1968 р. Page 259
