= Mavkovychi =

Rural locality in Lviv Oblast, Ukraine

Mavkovychi Ма́вковичі
- Village
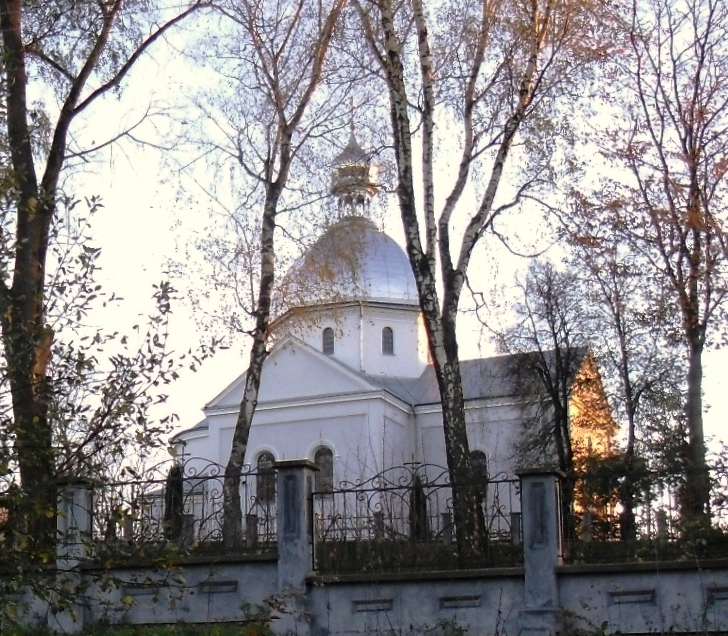

- Location within Lviv Oblast
- Coordinates: 49°44′50″N 23°41′51″E
- Country: Ukraine
- Oblast: Lviv Oblast
- District: Lviv Raion
- Established: 1490

Area
  - Total: 119 km^{2} (46 sq mi)
- Elevation /(average value of): 267 m (876 ft)

Population
  - Total: 1,190
  - Density: 99,916/km^{2} (258,780/sq mi)
- Time zone: UTC+2 (EET)
  - Summer (DST): UTC+3 (EEST)
- Postal code: 81550
- Area code: +380 3231
- Website: село Мавковичі ^{(Ukrainian)}

Mavkovychi (Ukrainian: Ма́вковичі) is a village (selo) in Lviv Raion, Lviv Oblast (province) of western Ukraine. It belongs to Horodok urban hromada, one of the hromadas of Ukraine. Mavkovychi is located along the way Horodok - Velykyi Liubin. Local government —Kernytska village council. The first mention of Mavkovychi dates from the year 1490. Then the village has received Magdeburg rights.

Until 18 July 2020, Mavkovychi belonged to Horodok Raion. The raion was abolished in July 2020 as part of the administrative reform of Ukraine, which reduced the number of raions of Lviv Oblast to seven. The area of Horodok Raion was merged into Lviv Raion.

The village Mavkovychi is situated in the 31 kilometres (19 mi) from the regional center Lviv, 7 kilometres (4.3 mi) from Horodok and 4 kilometres (2.5 mi) from Velykyi Liubin.

In the village there are church of the Nativity of the Most Holy Theotokos. The first stone cross was consecrated in 1898, and the church was built in 1902.

== Literature ==
- History of Towns and Villages of the Ukrainian SSR, Lvov region. – К. : ГРУРЕ, 1968 р. (in Ukrainian)
