= Rodatychi =

Rural locality in Lviv Oblast, Ukraine

Coordinates: 49°47′56″N 23°31′07″E

Rodatychi Родатичі
- Village
- The village of Rodatychi
- Interactive map of Rodatychi
- Country: Ukraine
- Oblast: Lviv Oblast
- Raion: Lviv Raion

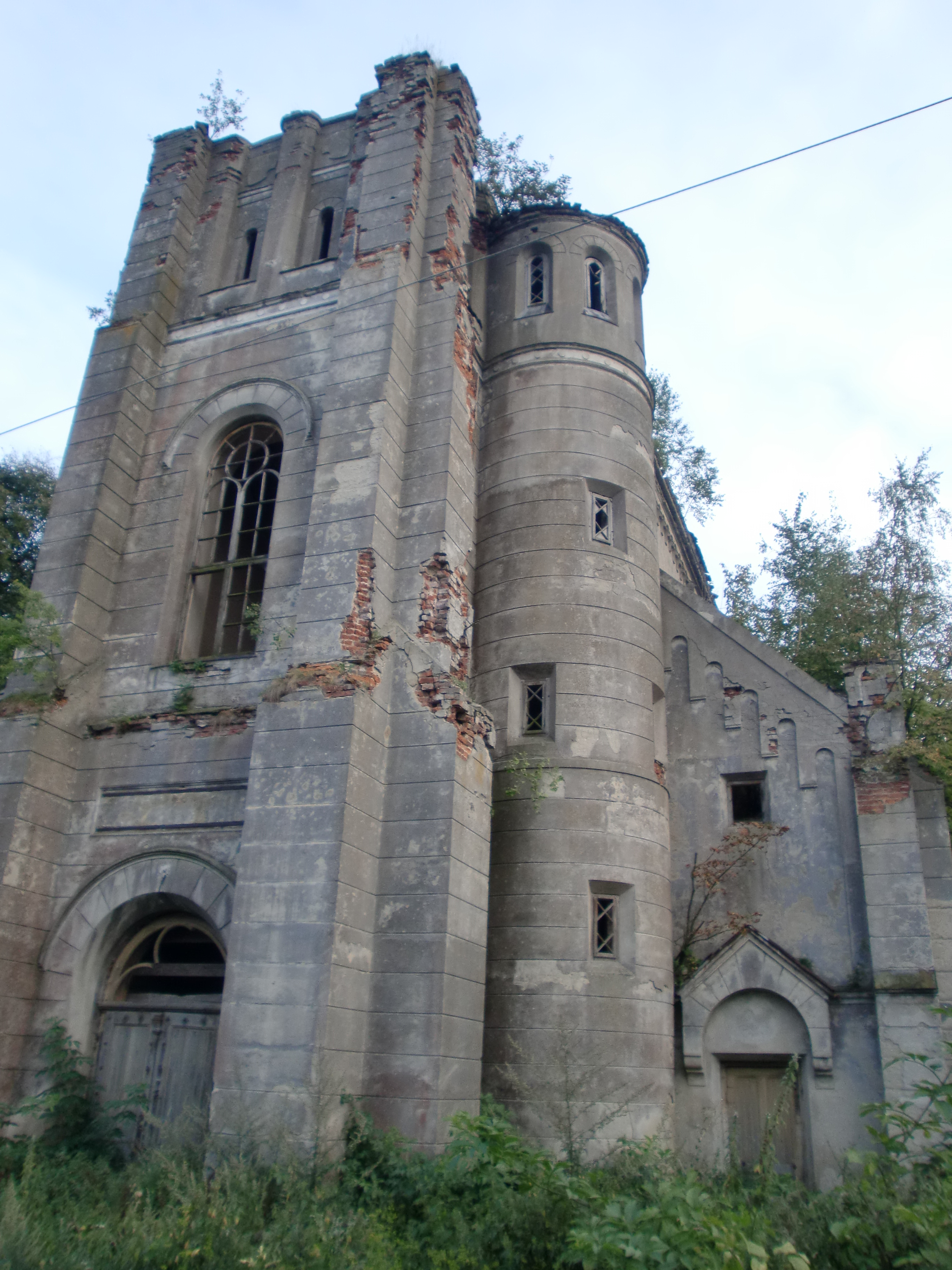
Abandoned catholic church in Rodatychi

Rodatychi (Ukrainian: Родатичі, formerly Городятичі, Horodiatyczi) is a village located in Lviv Raion, Lviv Oblast of Ukraine, and lies on the Tarnogród Plateau. It belongs to Horodok urban hromada, one of the hromadas of Ukraine. In the Second Polish Republic, the town was the seat of the rural commune of Rodatychi.

== History ==
The first mention of the village is in 1445. The village belonged to the estate of the Gródek eldership. The owners were the Austrian government, Jan Machan, and Antonina Mirska, who in 1890 transferred the property to the Congregation of the Sisters of Providence that he founded in Lviv. This partnered ownership was maintained until September 1939. The village had a railroad from the second half of the 19th century.

In 1929, the village was inhabited by 2561 inhabitants. There was a Roman Catholic church there. St. Church of the Holy Trinity and the Greek Catholic church were also churches in the village. The landowners were: Józef Habuda and Władysław Ostrowski, a cattle trader - H. Egort, the blacksmith - J. Kaliciak, the miller - L. Biernat, the Agricultural Circle, and the shoemaker, J. Kaniak. In the interwar period, only the Roman Catholic church remained, the Uniate parish ceased to exist.

In September 1939, German planes bombed a railway station, in the battle of Jaworów. After the village was invaded by the USSR, a prisoner camp was created for NKVD prisoners.

"The village of Rodatycze is located a little in the back, on the left side of the main road from Sądowa Wisznia to Gródek Jagielloński and then to Lviv. [...] "

Until 18 July 2020, Rodatychi belonged to Horodok Raion. The raion was abolished in July 2020 as part of the administrative reform of Ukraine, which reduced the number of raions of Lviv Oblast to seven. The area of Horodok Raion was merged into Lviv Raion.

== Education ==
There are secondary school in the village. 212 pupils from Tychapy, Vovchukhy and other villages in Lviv and Yavoriv districts. The school headmaster is - Savrey Stepan.

== Medicine ==
The outpatient clinic is situated in Rodatychi. It was opened in 2010.

== Transport ==
The Lviv-Shehyni M11 highway, which is a part of the European route E40, passes through the village.

== Culture ==
There is the Church of the Holy Trinity, built in the early XX century.

On the territory of the local cemetery there is a crypt with the burial of nuns of the Catholic Order.

Since 2011, the annual international festival "Zaxidfest" is held on the basis of "Magic Valley".

== Bibliography ==
1. Poland Address Book from 1929.
2. Z. Schneigert - NKVD camps of Polish prisoners of war from 1939 to 1941 in Eastern Lesser Poland [in:] Semper Fidelis 3-4 1992

== See also ==
- Gródecki District
- Gródek
- Judicial Vishnia
- Wołczuchy
