= Mylchytsi =

Rural locality in Lviv Oblast, Ukraine

Mylchytsi Мильчиці
- Location in Ukraine Mylchytsi (Lviv Oblast)
- Coordinates: 49°43′13″N 23°27′18″E
- Country: Ukraine
- Oblast (province): Lviv Oblast
- Raion (district): Lviv Raion
- Hromada (municipality): Horodok urban hromada

Population (2001)
  - Total: 294
- Time zone: UTC+2 (EET)
  - Summer (DST): UTC+3 (EEST)
- Postal code: 81531
- Area code: +380 3231

Mylchytsi (Ukrainian: Мильчиці) is a village in Lviv Raion, Lviv Oblast, Ukraine. It belongs to Horodok urban hromada, one of the hromadas of Ukraine.

Until 18 July 2020, Mylchytsi belonged to Horodok Raion. The raion was abolished in July 2020 as part of the administrative reform of Ukraine, which reduced the number of raions of Lviv Oblast to seven. The area of Horodok Raion was merged in Lviv Raion.
