= Uhry =

Uhry may refer to:

== People ==
- Alfred Uhry (born 1936), American playwright and screenwriter
- Jonathan Uhry Newman (1927–1991), American attorney and judge

== Places ==
- Uhry, Horodok Raion, Ukraine
- Uhry (Königslutter), Germany
