= Bratkovychi =

Rural locality in Lviv Oblast, Ukraine

Bratkovychi Братковичі
- Village
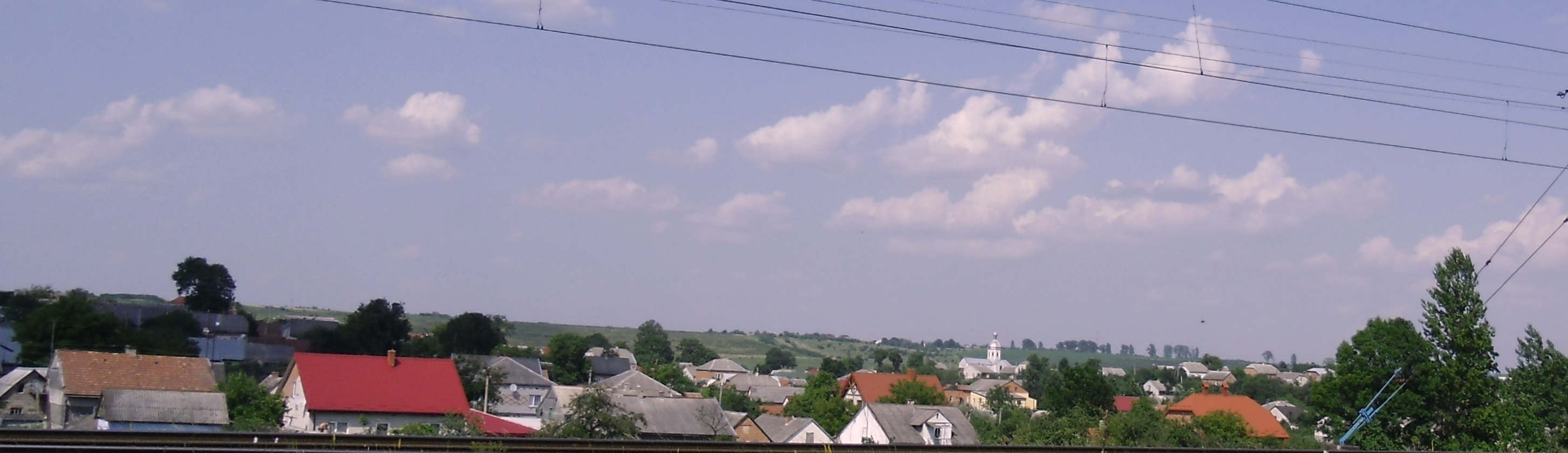
- General view of the village Bratkovychi.

- Location within Lviv Oblast
- Coordinates: 49°47′24″N 23°35′24″E
- Country: Ukraine
- Oblast: Lviv Oblast
- District: Lviv Raion
- Established: 1410

Area
  - Total: 1,295 km^{2} (500 sq mi)
- Elevation /(average value of): 247 m (810 ft)

Population
  - Total: 1,314
  - Density: 1.015/km^{2} (2.628/sq mi)
- Time zone: UTC+2 (EET)
  - Summer (DST): UTC+3 (EEST)
- Postal code: 81524
- Area code: +380 3231
- Website: село Братковичі / райцентр Городок / облцентр Львів ^{(Ukrainian)}

Bratkovychi (Ukrainian: Братковичі, pol. Bratkowice) is a selo (village) in Lviv Raion, Lviv Oblast (province) of western Ukraine. It belongs to Horodok urban hromada, one of the hromadas of Ukraine. Bratkovychi is near the Polish border. Local government – Bratkovytska village council.

Until 18 July 2020, Bratkovychi belonged to Horodok Raion. The raion was abolished in July 2020 as part of the administrative reform of Ukraine, which reduced the number of raions of Lviv Oblast to seven. The area of Horodok Raion was merged into Lviv Raion.

The first written mention of the settlement dates back to 1410.

In Bratkovychi are Greek Catholic Church of the Nativity of the Blessed Virgin Mary, built in 1903.

Bratkovychi gained notoriety in 1996, when two families, the Pilats and the Krychkovskyi, totaling 9 people, were murdered by the serial killer Anatoly Onoprienko.

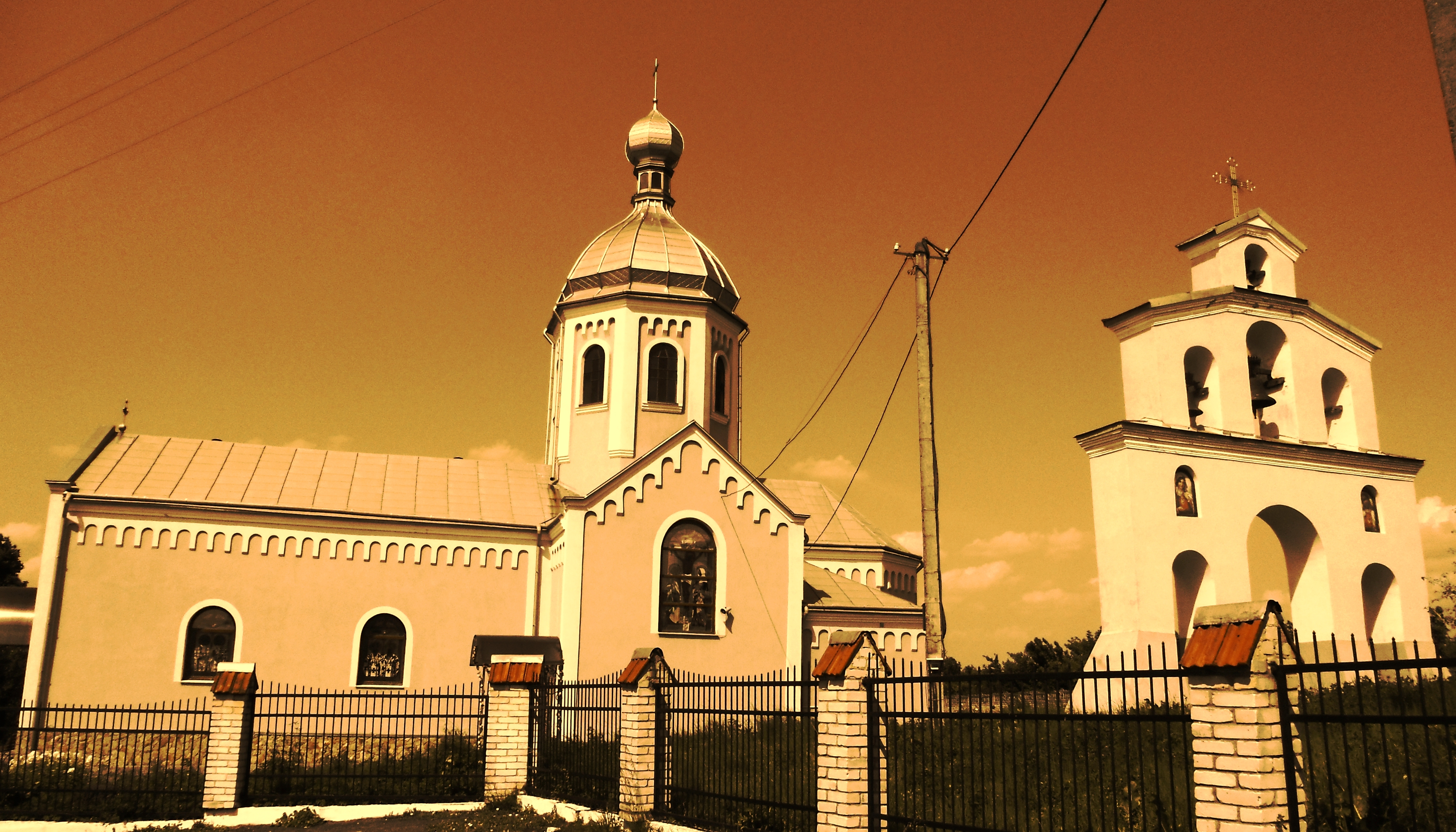
Church of the Nativity of the Blessed Virgin Mary.
