= Halychany =

Halychany the name of the inhabitants of Galicia. It may also refer to:

- Halychany, Lviv Oblast, village in Horodok Raion, Lviv Oblast
- Halychany, Volyn Oblast, village in Horokhiv Raion, Volyn Oblast
