= Uhry, Lviv Oblast =

Rural locality in Lviv Oblast, Ukraine

Uhry Угри
- Village
- Location within Ukraine Location within Lviv Oblast
- Coordinates: 49°43′48″N 23°36′40″E
- Country: Ukraine
- Oblast (province): Lviv Oblast
- Raion (district): Lviv Raion
- Hromada (municipality): Horodok urban hromada
- Established: 1427

Area
  - Total: 217 km^{2} (84 sq mi)
- Elevation /(average value of): 285 m (935 ft)

Population
  - Total: ▼1,100
  - Density: 52,258/km^{2} (135,350/sq mi)
- Time zone: UTC+2 (EET)
  - Summer (DST): UTC+3 (EEST)
- Postal code: 81553
- Area code: +380 3231
- Website: селище Угри ^{(Ukrainian)}

Uhry (Ukrainian: У́гри, previous name – Uhertsi, Polish: Uherce Niezabitowskie) is a village (selo) in Lviv Raion, Lviv Oblast (province) of Western Ukraine. It belongs to Horodok urban hromada, one of the hromadas of Ukraine. The village covers an area of 2,17 km^{2} and the population is around 1100 people.

== Geography ==
The village Uhry is located at a distance of 6 kilometres (3.7 mi) from the highway in Ukraine M 11 connecting Lviv with Przemyśl. It is situated in the 37 kilometres (23 mi) from the regional center Lviv, 9 kilometres (5.6 mi) from the district center Horodok and 64 kilometres (40 mi) to the Przemyśl.

== History ==
Uhry was probably founded in the fifteenth century; records first mention it in 1427. The village has been of the Polish family Nezabytovsky until First World War. The Nezabytovski family were held in high esteem and respect for among the local population.

Until 18 July 2020, Uhry belonged to Horodok Raion. The raion was abolished in July 2020 as part of the administrative reform of Ukraine, which reduced the number of raions of Lviv Oblast to seven. The area of Horodok Raion was merged into Lviv Raion.

== Cult constructions and religion ==
In the village there are two churches:

- Church of St. Paraskeva.
- Roman Catholic Church - Chapel Nezabytovskyh 1902.

== Gallery ==
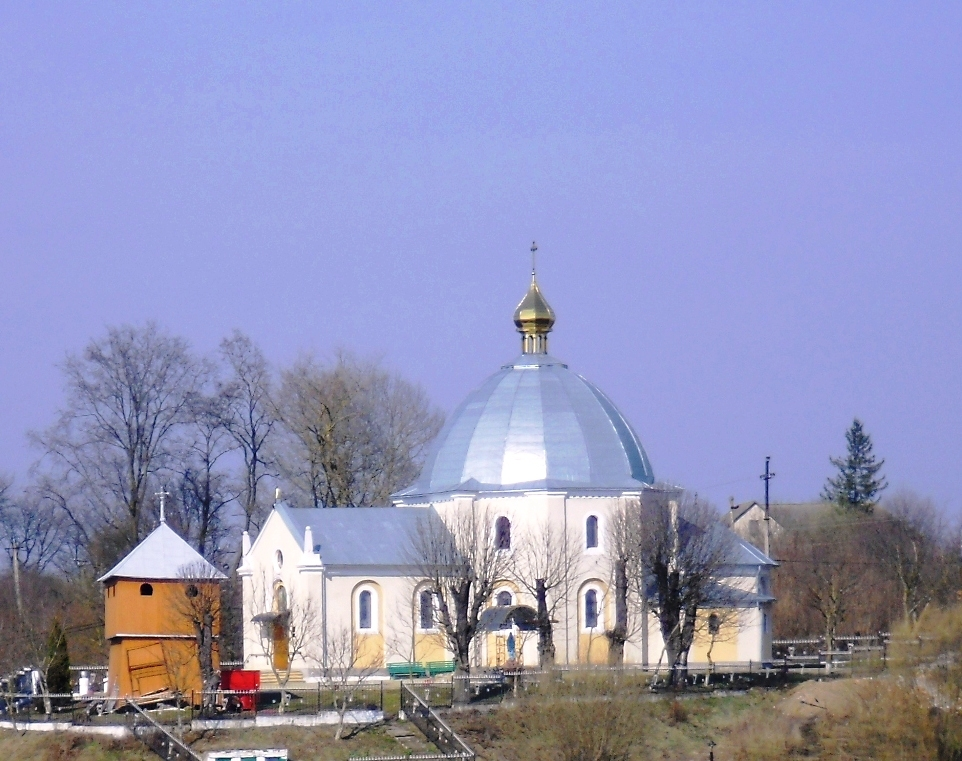
Church of St. Paraskeva.

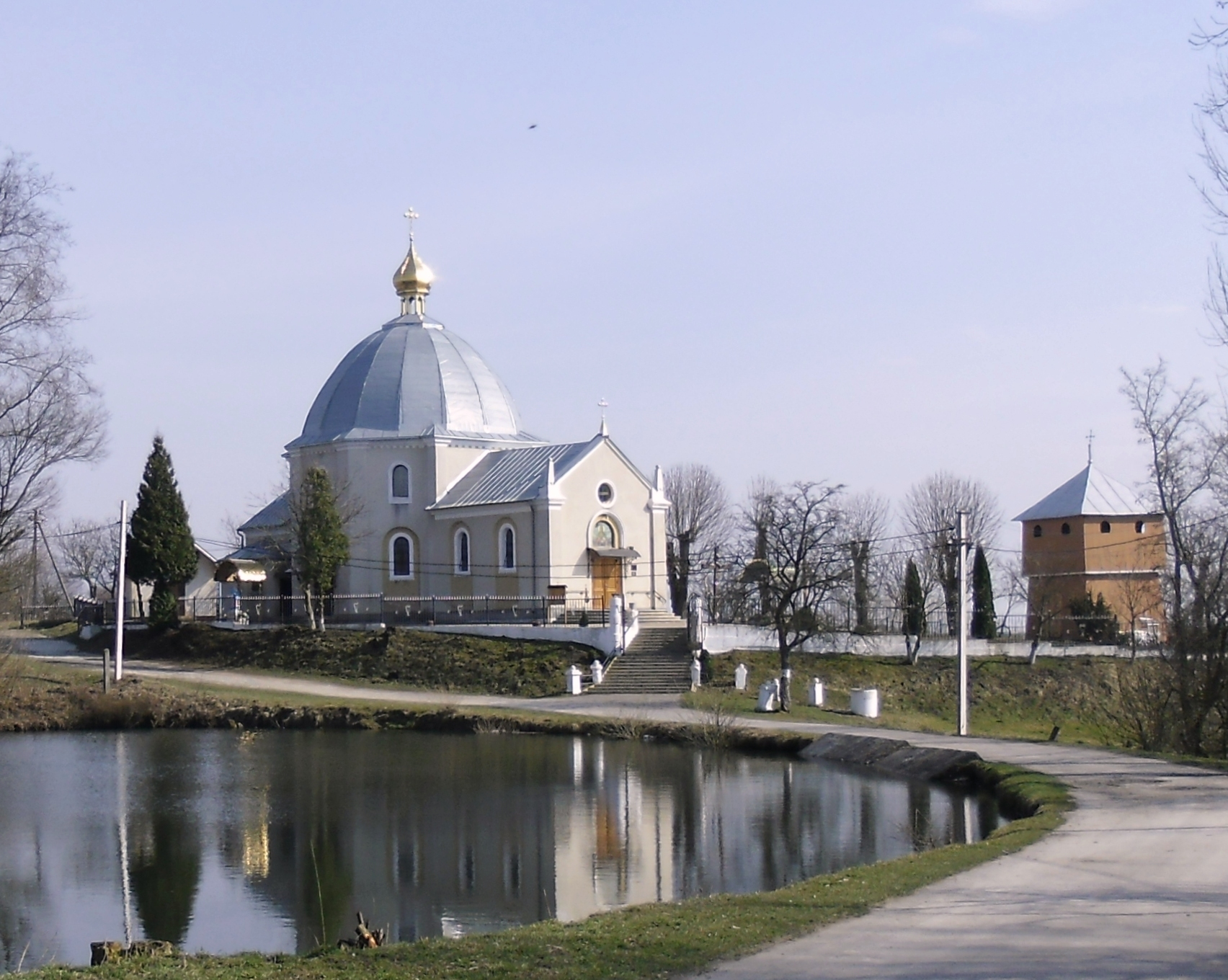
Church of St. Paraskeva. Ugry, Horodok Raion

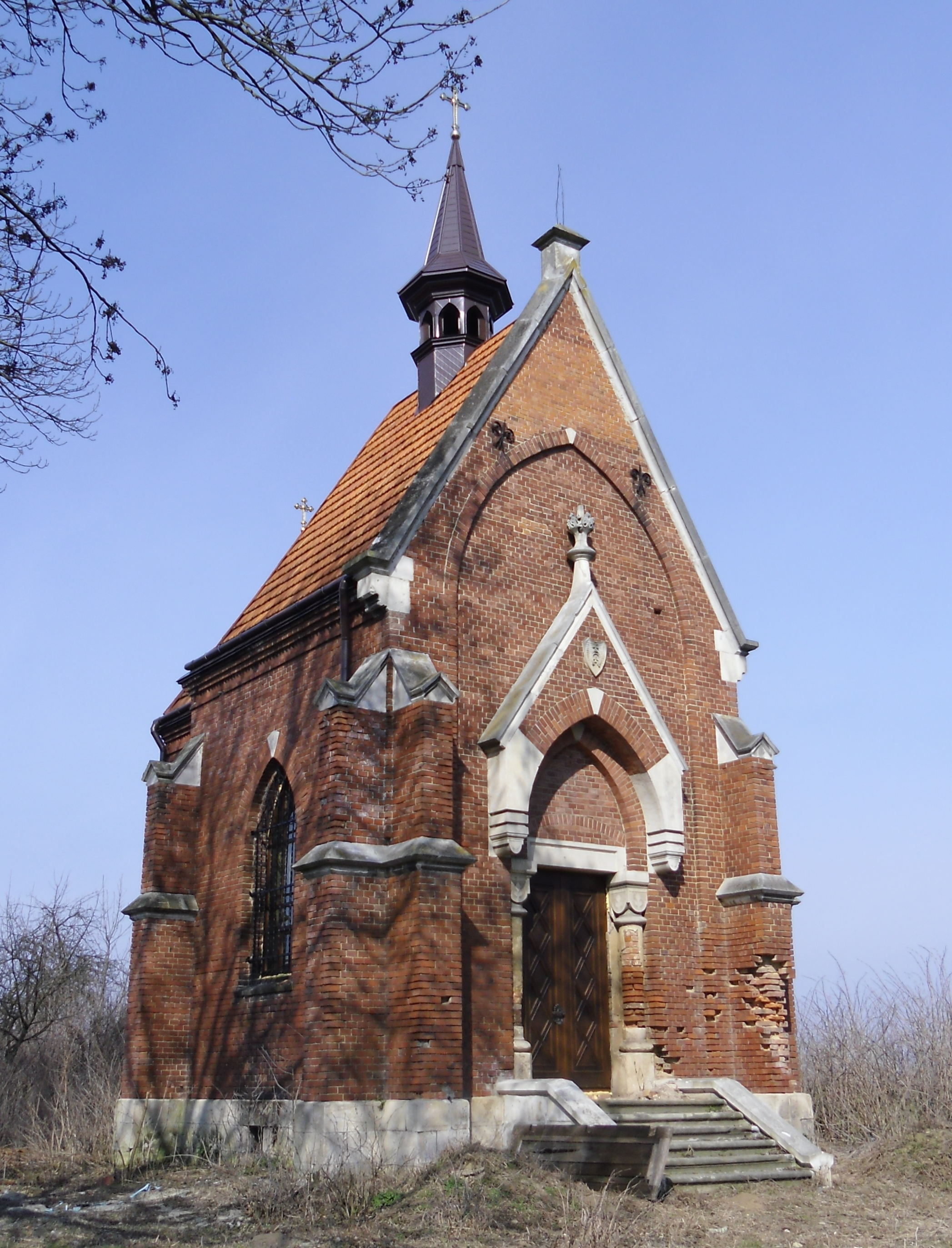
Chapel Nezabytovskyh in the village Ugry

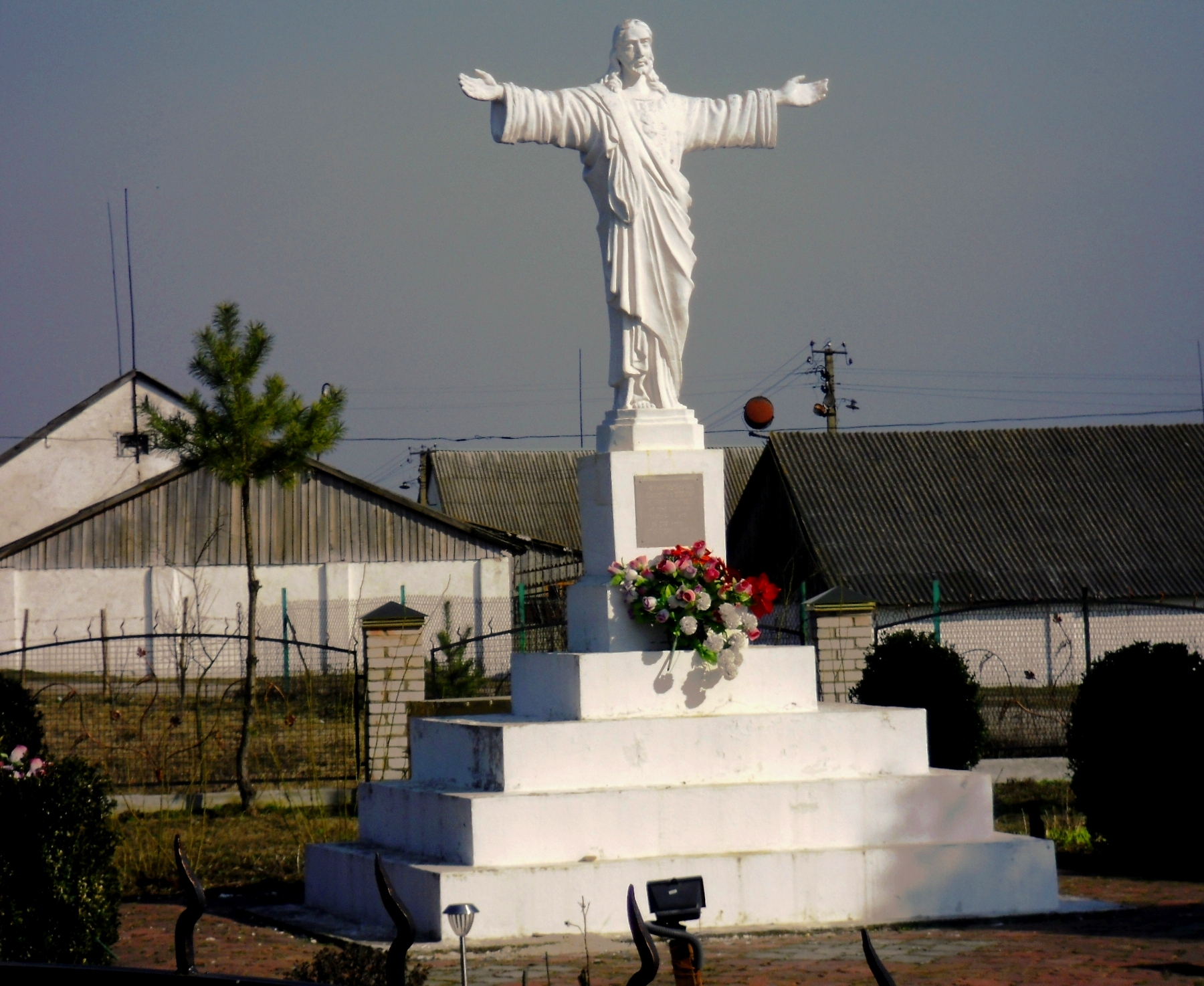
The figure of Jesus Christ in the village Ugry

== Literature ==
- Ukrainian: (Історія міст і сіл УРСР : Львівська область. – К. : ГРУРЕ, 1968 р.) Page 261.
