= Mshana, Lviv Oblast =

Rural locality in Lviv Oblast, Ukraine

Mshana Мшана
- Village
- Location within Lviv Oblast
- Coordinates: 49°49′44″N 23°47′14″E
- Country: Ukraine
- Oblast (province): Lviv Oblast
- Raion (district): Lviv Raion
- Hromada (municipality): Horodok urban hromada
- Established: 1453

Area
  - Total: 1,433 km^{2} (553 sq mi)
- Elevation /(average value of): 293 m (961 ft)

Population
  - Total: 2,821
  - Density: 19,686/km^{2} (50,990/sq mi)
- Time zone: UTC+2 (EET)
  - Summer (DST): UTC+3 (EEST)
- Postal code: 81512
- Area code: +380 3231
- Website: село Мшана ^{(Ukrainian)}

Mshana (Ukrainian: Мша́на, Polish: Mszana) is a village (selo) in Lviv Raion, Lviv Oblast (province) of western Ukraine. It belongs to Horodok urban hromada, one of the hromadas of Ukraine.

== Geography ==
The village is situated at an altitude of 293 metres (960 ft) above sea level. Through the village passes railway from Lviv to Przemyśl in Poland and is located at a distance of 4 kilometres (2.5 mi) from the highway in Ukraine M 11 connecting Lviv with Przemyśl. Distance from the district center of Horodok is 15 kilometres (9.3 mi), 20 kilometres (12 mi) from the regional center of Lviv and 81 kilometres (50 mi) to the Przemyśl.

== History ==
The first record of the village dates back to 1453 year. The origin of the name of the village probably derives from Polish words 'msha' (of God liturgy).

In the Second Polish Republic, the village was the seat of the Mszana rural commune in Grodek County, Lviv Voivodeship.

In 1943–1944, Ukrainian nationalists from the OUN-UPA brutally murdered 14 Poles and 4 Ukrainians here as a part of considered as a genocide Massacres of Poles in Volhynia and Eastern Galicia.

Until 18 July 2020, Mshana belonged to Horodok Raion. The raion was abolished in July 2020 as part of the administrative reform of Ukraine, which reduced the number of raions of Lviv Oblast to seven. The area of Horodok Raion was merged into Lviv Raion.

== Sights ==
The village has an architectural monument of local importance of Horodok Raion (Horodok district) – Introduction of the Blessed Virgin Mary Church (wooden, 1799) (1574 –м).

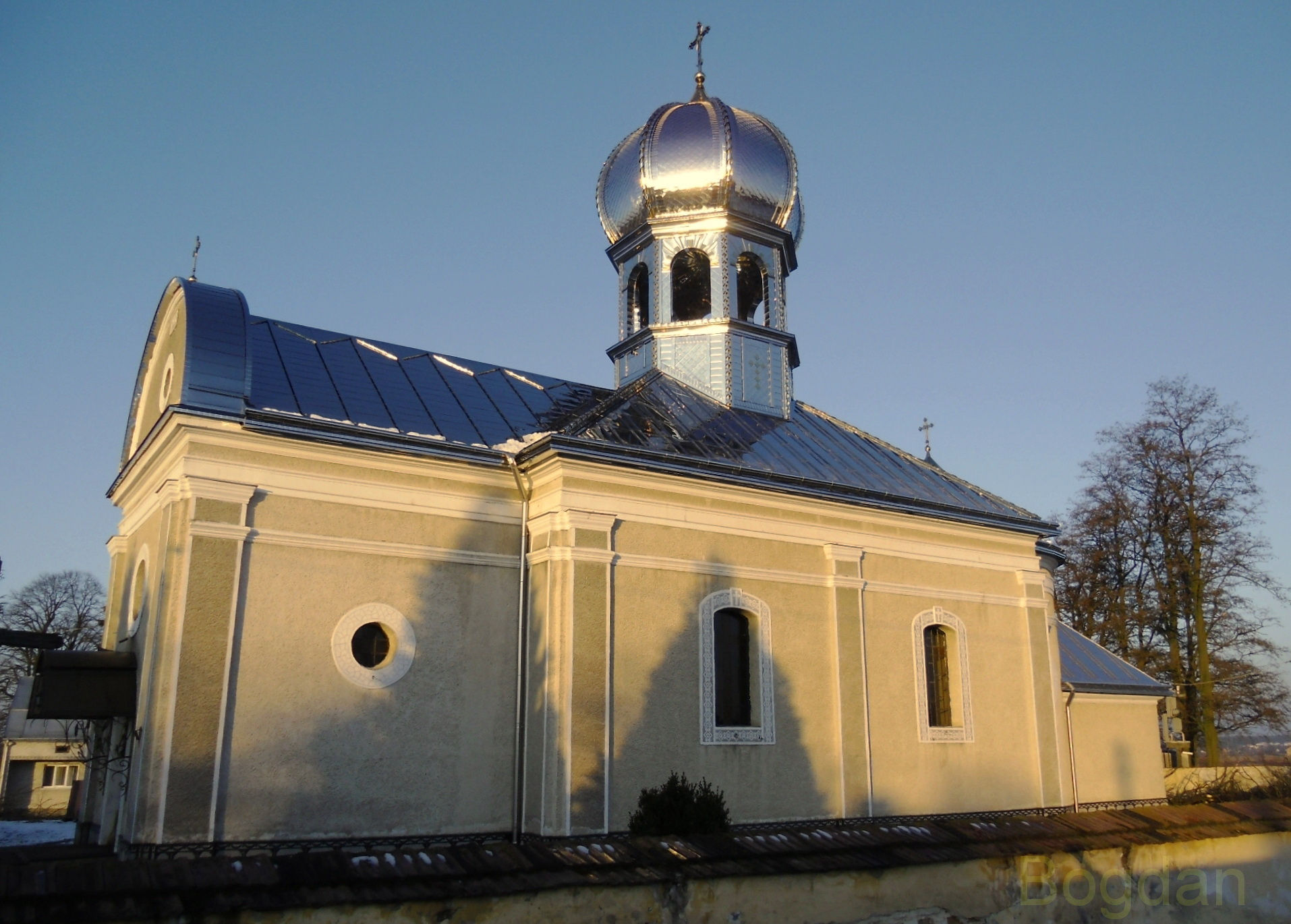
Church Introduction of the Blessed Virgin Mary

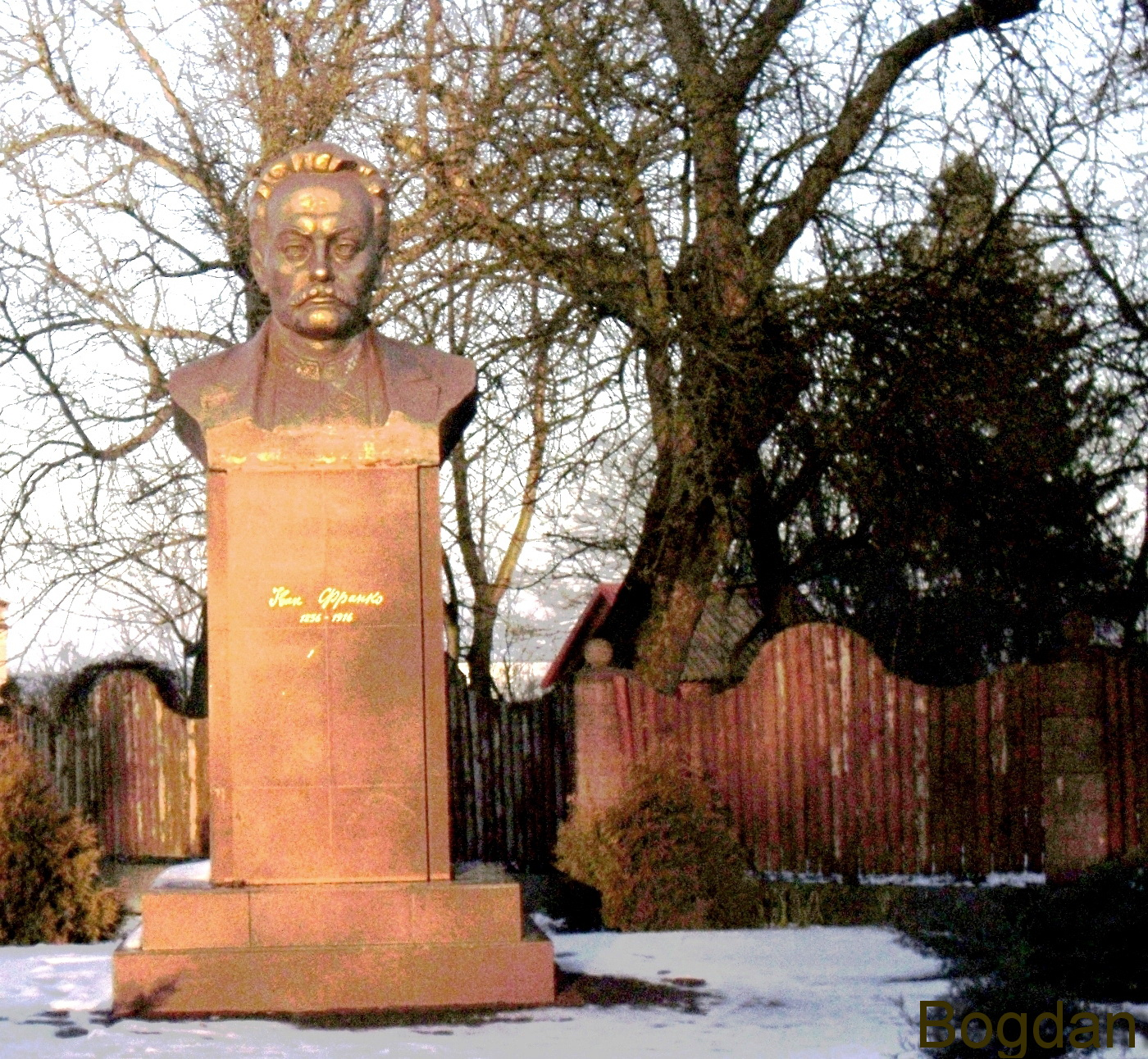
Monument of Ivan Franko in the village Mshana

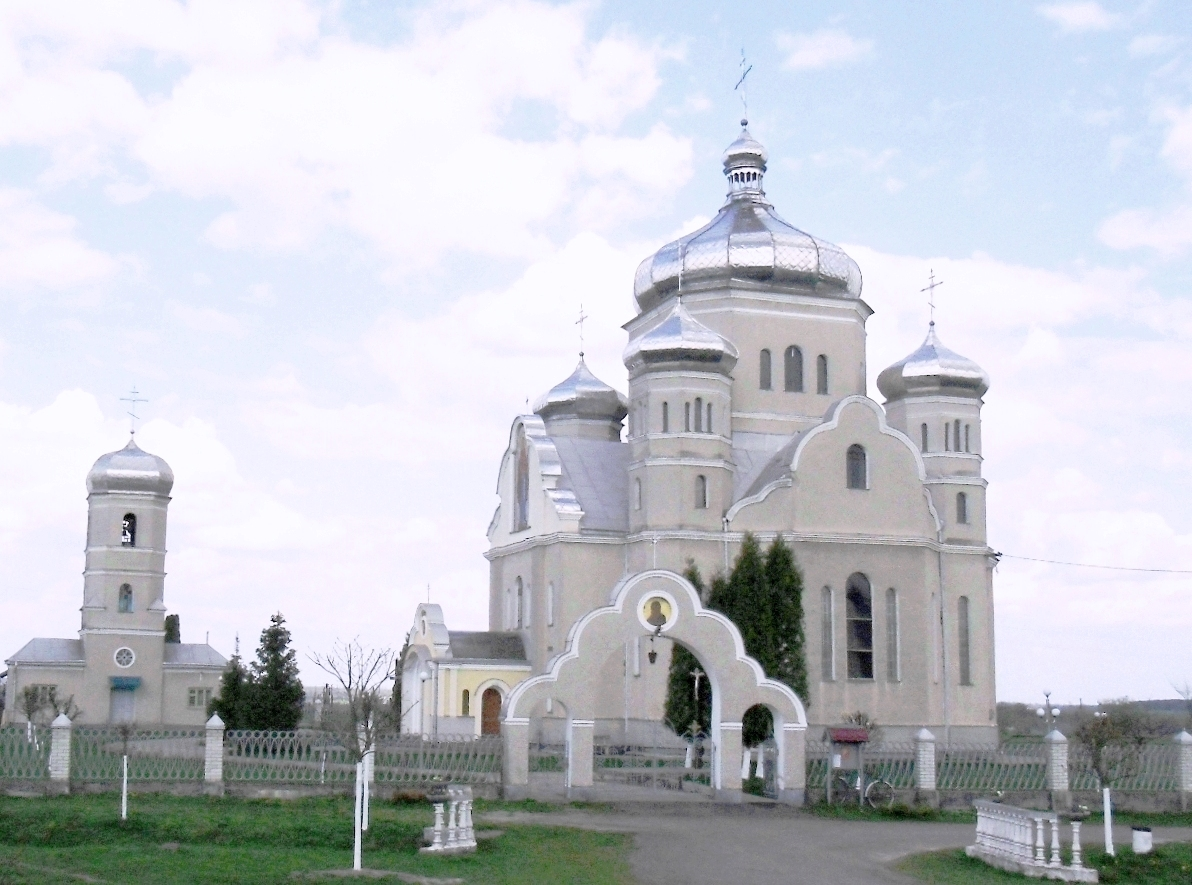
Church of the Presentation of the Blessed Virgin Mary OCU

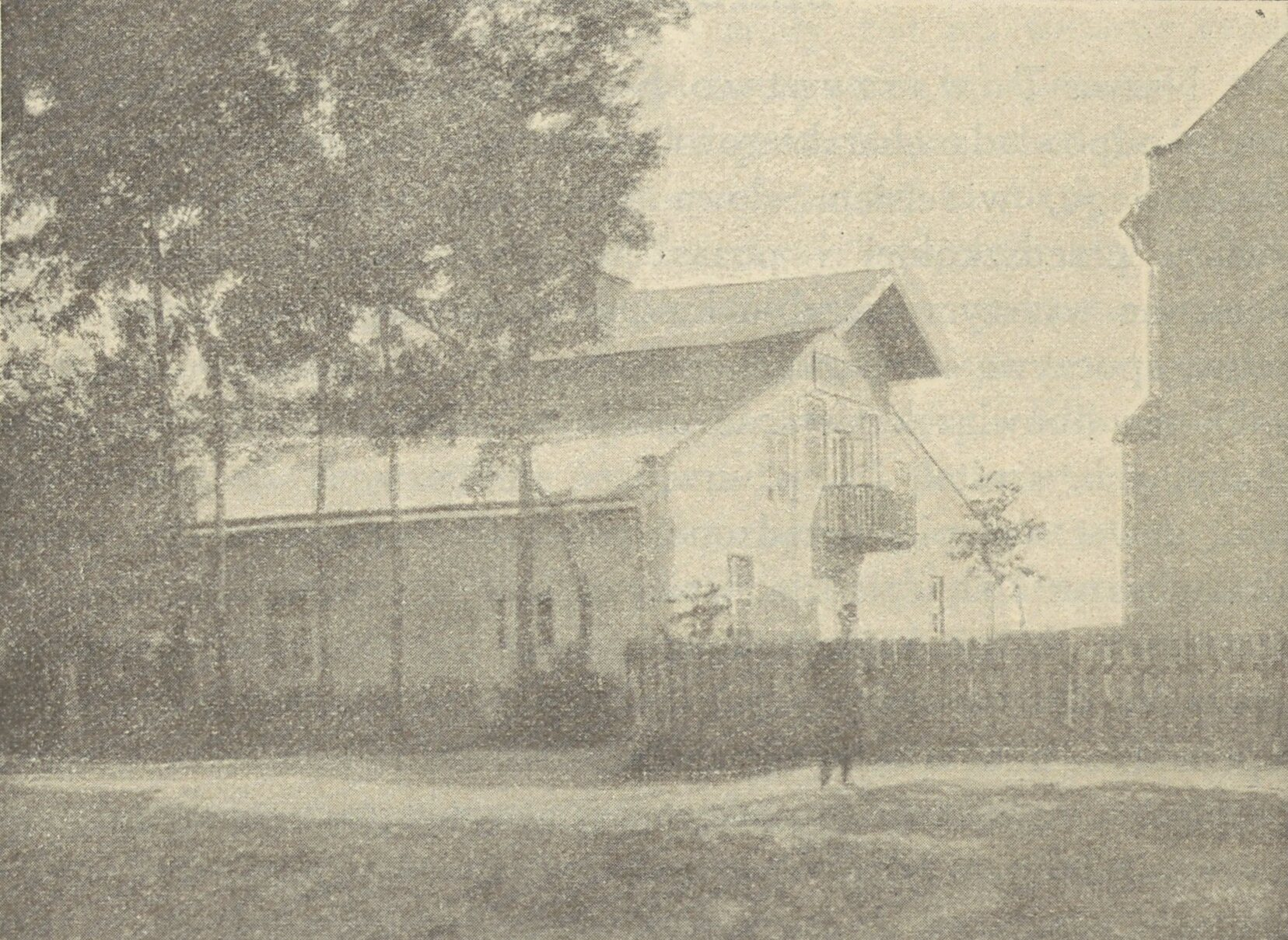
Polish House in Mszana, before 1911

== Literature ==
- Ukrainian: Історія міст і сіл УРСР : Львівська область. – К. : ГРУРЕ, 1968 р. Page 260
