= Halychany, Lviv Oblast =

Rural locality in Lviv Oblast, Ukraine

Halychany Галичани
- Village
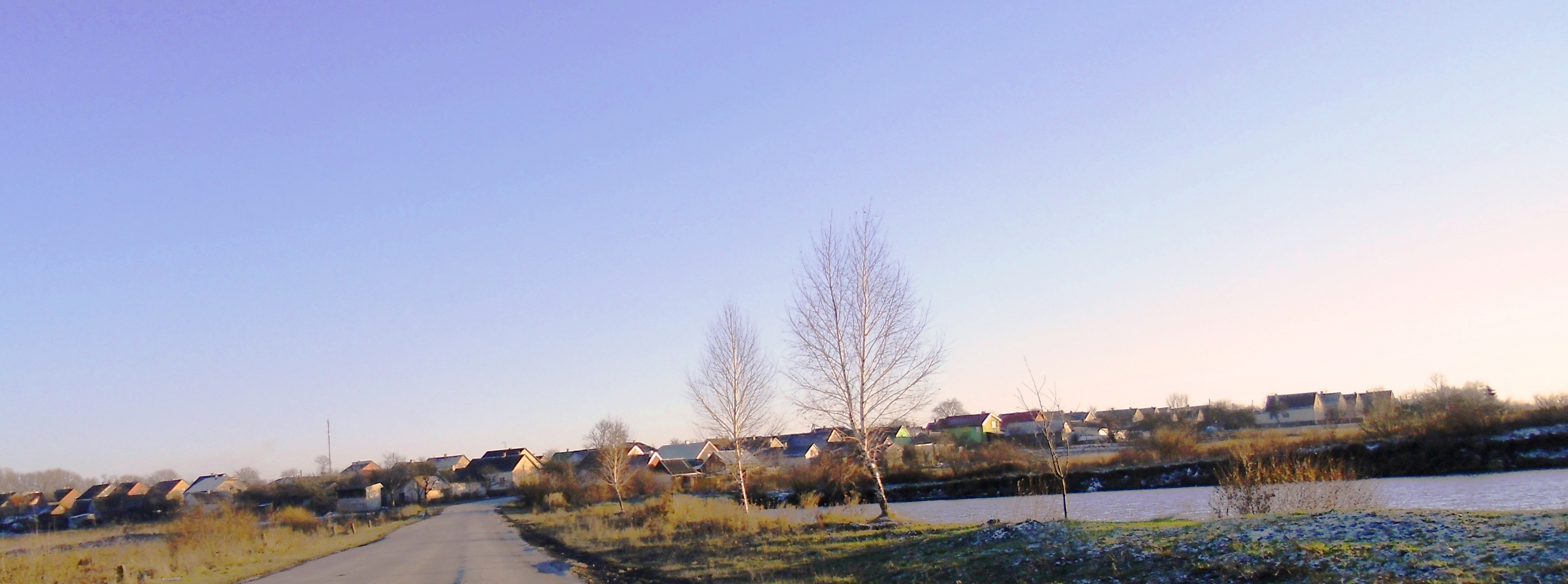

- Location within Lviv Oblast
- Coordinates: 49°48′27″N 23°36′01″E
- Country: Ukraine
- Oblast: Lviv Oblast
- District: Lviv Raion
- Established: 1473

Area
  - Total: 1,185 km^{2} (458 sq mi)
- Elevation /(average value of): 282 m (925 ft)

Population
  - Total: 776
  - Density: 0.655/km^{2} (1.70/sq mi)
- Time zone: UTC+2 (EET)
  - Summer (DST): UTC+3 (EEST)
- Postal code: 81504
- Area code: +380 3231
- Website: село Галичани / райцентр Городок / облцентр Львів^{(Ukrainian)}

Halychany (Ukrainian: Галича́ни) is a village in Lviv Raion, Lviv Oblast in western Ukraine. It belongs to Horodok urban hromada, one of the hromadas of Ukraine. The population of the village is about 776 people. Local government is administered by Halychanivska village council.

== Geography ==
The village is located at a distance of 7 kilometres (4.3 mi) from the district center of Horodok along the road from Horodok to Yavoriv. That is a distance 25 kilometres (16 mi) from the town of Yavoriv and 35 kilometres (22 mi) from the regional center of Lviv.

== History ==
The first mention of Halychany dates from the year 1473.

Until 18 July 2020, Halychany belonged to Horodok Raion. The raion was abolished in July 2020 as part of the administrative reform of Ukraine, which reduced the number of raions of Lviv Oblast to seven. The area of Horodok Raion was merged into Lviv Raion.

== Cult constructions and religion ==
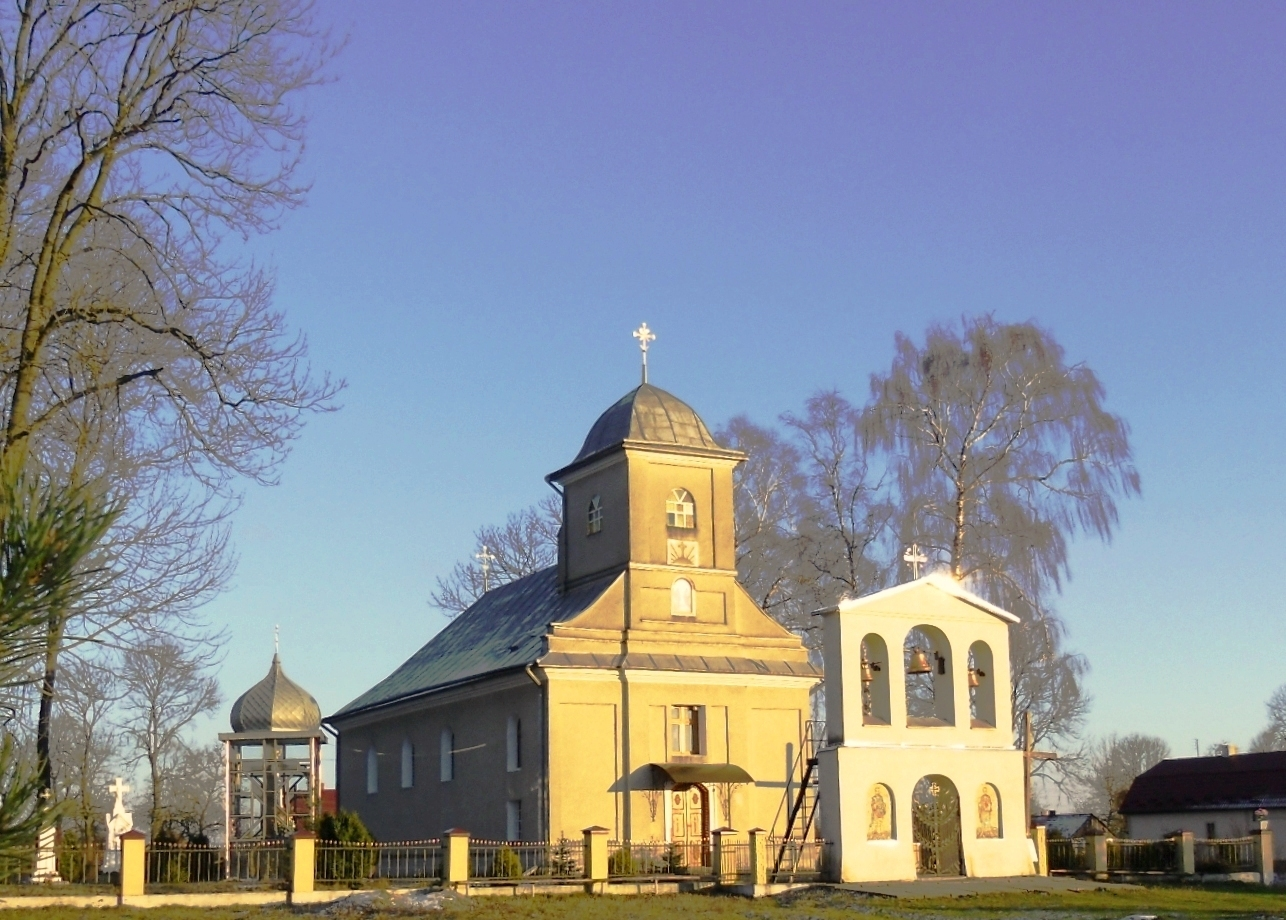
St. Cosmas and St. Damian's Church (1819)

An architectural monument of local importance of the Horodok district is in the village of Halychany. It is the St. Cosmas and St. Damian's Greek Catholic Church, built in 1819 (1569M).
