= Yaroslav Omelyan =

Ukrainian artist (1929–2025)

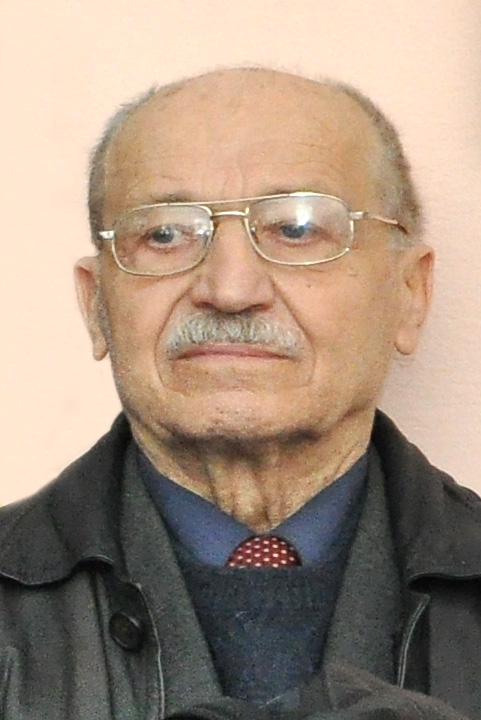
Yaroslav Omelyan

Yaroslav Maksymovych Omelyan (Ukrainian: Ярослав Максимович Омелян; 1 January 1929 – 21 August 2025) was a Ukrainian artist.

== Life and career ==
Omelyan was born in the village of Mshana, Lwów Voivodeship, Poland. During 1950–1959 he was repressed and spent time in Gulag labour camps in Siberia.

He was a member of the Union of Artists of Ukraine, an honorary member of the All-Ukrainian Society "Prosvita" and was awarded the Merited Painter of Ukraine.

From 1969 he participated in collective exhibitions in cities across Europe.
