= Zymna Voda rural hromada =

Zymna Voda rural hromada Зимноводівська сільська громада
- Hromada
- Interactive map of Zymna Voda rural hromada
- Coordinates: 49°49′19″N 23°54′10″E
- Country: Ukraine
- Oblast: Lviv Oblast
- Raion: Lviv Raion
- Founded: 2018
- Admin. center: Zymna Voda

Area
  - Total: 30.9 km^{2} (11.9 sq mi)

Population (2022)
  - Total: 19,577
  - Density: 634/km^{2} (1,640/sq mi)
- CATOTTG code: UA46060170000014754
- Settlements: 5
- Villages: 5

Zymna Voda rural hromada (Ukrainian: Зимноводівська сільська громада) is a hromada (municipality) in Ukraine, in Lviv Raion of Lviv Oblast. The administrative center is the village of Zymna Voda.

The area of the hromada is 30.9 square kilometres (11.9 mi^{2}), and the population is 19,577 (2022 estimate)

Until 18 July 2020, the hromada belonged to Pustomyty Raion. The raion was abolished in July 2020 as part of the administrative reform of Ukraine, which reduced the number of raions of Lviv Oblast to seven.

== Settlements ==
The hromada consists of 5 villages:

- Kholodnovidka
- Lapaivka
- Sknyliv
- Sukhovolia
- Zymna Voda
