= Vasyl Otkovych =

Ukrainian art historian, museum worker (1950–2017)

- Василь Петрович Откович
- Born: 20 June 1950; Vovchukhy, Lviv Oblast (now Ukraine)
- Died: 25 May 2017 (aged 66); Lviv
- Education: Lviv Ivan Trush School of Applied and Decorative Arts, Kyiv Art Institute
- Occupations: Art historian, museum worker
- Awards: Order of Merit; Shevchenko National Prize; Merited Figure of Arts of Ukraine

Vasyl Otkovych (Ukrainian: Василь Петрович Откович; 20 June 1950 – 25 May 2017) was a Ukrainian art historian and museum worker. He was the father of Nataliia and the brother of Myroslav Otkovych. In 1993, he received a Candidate of Art History. In 1986, he became a member of the National Union of Artists of Ukraine.

== Biography ==
Vasyl Otkovych was born on 20 June 1950, in Vovchukhy, Lviv Oblast, now Ukraine.

In 1969, he graduated from the Lviv Ivan Trush School of Applied and Decorative Arts (teachers of the specialty M. Batih, T. Drahan, T. Levkiv, P. Markovych), and in 1978, from the Kyiv Art Institute (teachers of the specialty L. Miliaieva, P. Biletskyi). From 1970, he worked at the Lviv Museum of Ukrainian Art as a guide, and from 1978, as the chief curator of the collections. In 1980, he started working at the Museum of Ethnography and Crafts, where he was first a junior research fellow, and from 1983, the head of the exposition sector. In 1990, he became the head of the institution. From 1994 to 2001, he was the director of the National Museum in Lviv. From 2001 to 2003, he held the position of head of the Department of Culture of the Lviv Regional State Administration. From 2003 to 2017, he was the director of the Lviv Ivan Trush College of Decorative and Applied Arts. During the same period, from 1999 to 2004, he was the head of the Department of Byzantology at University of Lviv.

He died on 25 May 2017 in Lviv.

== Works ==
His areas of scientific interest were folk icons and the exploration of the depth of Ukrainian sacred art. He participated in national and international scientific conferences, including in 1991 in Edmonton, Canada, on the occasion of the 100th anniversary of Ukrainian emigration at the University of Alberta, and in 1992 in Paris at the 1st International Colloquium "Meeting of Ethnographic Museums of Europe".

Author-compiler of albums:

- "Ivan Skolozdra. Painting on Glass" (1990),
- "Ukrainian Folk Painting of the 13th–20th Centuries" (1991, co-author),
- "Ukrainian Icon of the 14th–18th Centuries: From the Collection of the National Museum in Lviv" (1999, co-author and author of the introductory article),
- "Ukrainian Folk Icon" (2010),
- a collection of scientific articles and interviews "Art is an Eternal Mystery" (2010),
- exhibition catalogs.

Among his main works:

- "Hutsulshchyna: Historical and Ethnographic Study" (1987, co-author);
- "Folk Trends in Ukrainian Painting of the 17th–18th Centuries" (1990);
- "Ukrainian Ethnology: Study Guide" (1994, co-author);
- "Podillia: Historical and Ethnographic Study" (1994, co-author).

== Awards ==
- Merited Figure of Arts of Ukraine (2006).
- Shevchenko National Prize (1995).
- Order of Merit of the 3rd (1999) and 2nd (2017) class.

== Bibliography ==
- Станкевич М. Є. Откович Василь Петрович // Енциклопедія історії України : у 10 т. / редкол.: В. А. Смолій (голова) та ін. ; Інститут історії України НАН України. — К. : Наукова думка, 2010. — Т. 7 : Мл — О. — С. 701. — ISBN 978-966-00-1061-1.
