= Zymna Voda =

Village in Lviv Oblast, Ukraine

Zymna Voda Зимна Вода
- Village
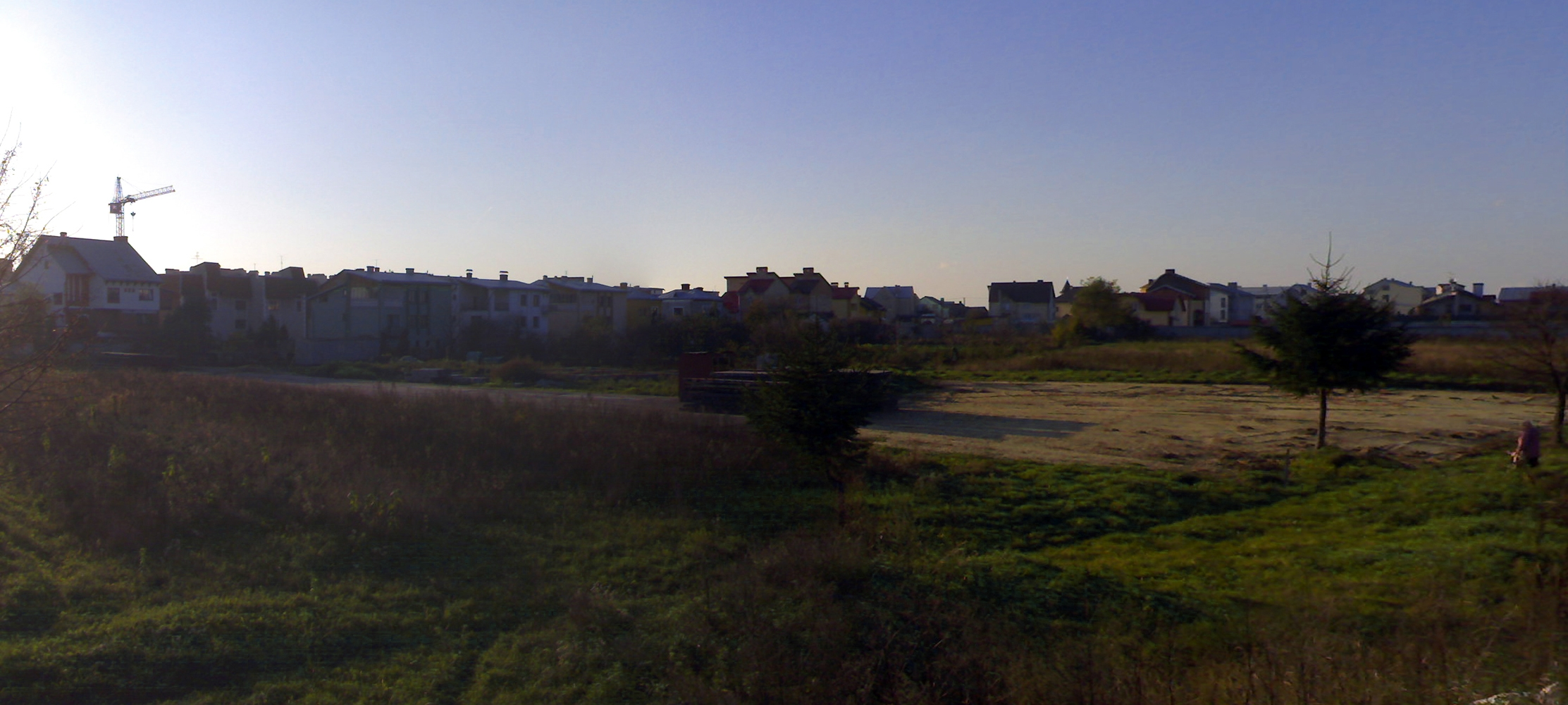

- Coat of arms

- Location within Lviv Oblast Location within Ukraine
- Coordinates: 49°49′20″N 23°54′10″E
- Country: Ukraine
- Oblast: Lviv Oblast
- District: Lviv Raion
- Hromada: Zymna Voda rural hromada

Area
  - Total: 12.519 km^{2} (4.834 sq mi)
- Elevation: 311 m (1,020 ft)

Population (2021)
  - Total: 11,306
  - Density: 903.11/km^{2} (2,339.0/sq mi)
- Time zone: UTC+2 (EET)
  - Summer (DST): UTC+3 (EEST)
- Postal code: 81110
- Area code: +380 32230

Zymna Voda (Ukrainian: Зимна Вода) is a village in Lviv Raion, Lviv Oblast, Ukraine. It hosts the administration of Zymna Voda rural hromada, one of the hromadas of Ukraine.

== History ==
Zymna Voda was mentioned in 1427 as in Zympnewody. The village initially belonged to the Ruthenian Voivodeship of the Polish-Lithuanian Commonwealth and was ethnically Polish as early as the Middle Ages. The names of the inhabitants were also predominantly Polish in the historical sources. Later, it was mentioned as Zymnawoda (1461), Zymna woda (1469), de Zimnawoda (1484), Zimnawoda (1578). The name is derived from the name of a local stream and means "cold water".

During the First Partition of Poland in 1772, the village became part of the new Kingdom of Galicia and Lodomeria of the Habsburg Empire in 1804. In 1900, the Zimna Woda had 107 houses with 755 inhabitants, of which 668 were Polish speakers, 13 were Ruthenian speakers, 72 were German speakers, 581 were Roman Catholics, 67 were Greek Catholics, 30 were Jews and 77 were of other faiths.

After the Polish–Ukrainian War ended in 1919, Zimna Woda became part of the Second Polish Republic. In 1921 the municipality had 144 houses with 819 inhabitants, of which 813 were Poles, 6 Germans, 720 Roman Catholics, 24 Greek Catholics, 53 Protestants, and 22 Jews (religion). During World War II, it first belonged to the Soviet Union and in 1941 to the General Government, from 1945 again to the Soviet Union via Ukrainian SSR. On 18 July 1946, the place was renamed Vodiane (Водяне) and on 18 December 1990, its name was reverted to Zymna Voda.

Until 18 July 2020, Zymna Voda belonged to Pustomyty Raion. The raion was abolished in July 2020 as part of the administrative reform of Ukraine, which reduced the number of raions of Lviv Oblast to seven.

== Demographics ==
At the end of the 19th century, there were 111 households in Zymna Voda, and the population was 764, among whom the overwhelming majority were Poles, 83 were Germans and 55 were Jews. Many Germans were Polonized under the influence of local conditions, and as a result, in 1900, only 46% of the inhabitants of the village identified themselves as Germans.

Native language as of the Ukrainian Census of 2001:

- Ukrainian 99.19%
- Russian 0.60%
- Armenian 0.07%
- Polish 0.04%
- Belarusian 0.04%
- Moldovan (Romanian) 0.01%
- Hungarian 0.01%
- Others 0.04%
