= Lviv Ivan Trush College of Decorative and Applied Arts =

Public university in Lviv, Ukraine

- Ukrainian: Львівський фаховий коледж декоративного і ужиткового мистецтва імені Івана Труша
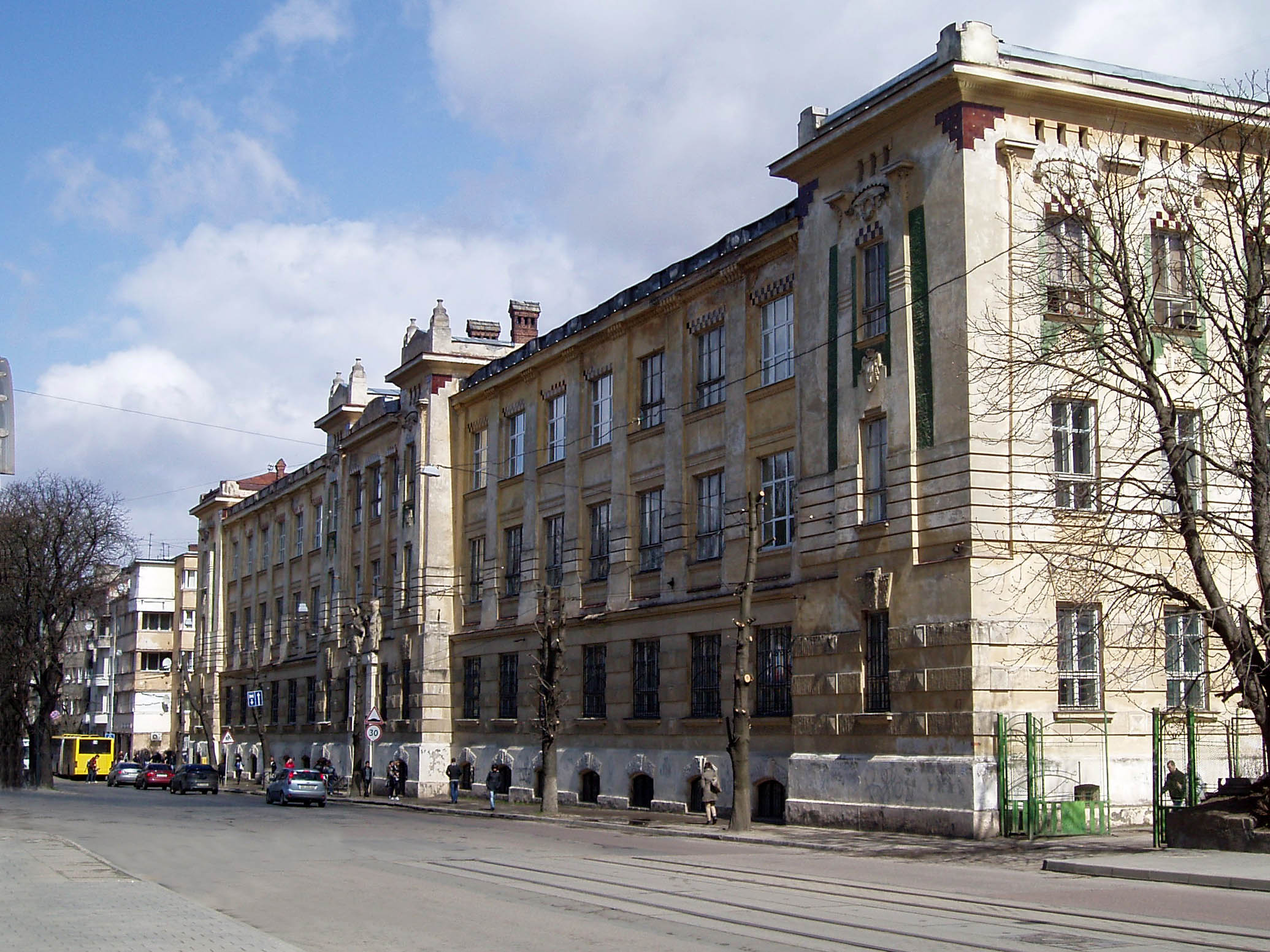
- The Lviv Ivan Trush College of Decorative and Applied Arts
- Established: 1876
- Rector: Olha Kotsovska
- Location: 47 Snopkivska Str. 79011 Lviv Ukraine, Lviv, Ukraine
- Website: https://www.artcollege.lviv.ua

Lviv Ivan Trush College of Decorative and Applied Arts is a higher education establishment in Lviv, Ukraine.

== History ==
In 1876, the School of Drawing and Modeling was opened in Lviv, which changed its status and name throughout its existence.

Chronologically:

- 1882 – School of Arts and Crafts;
- 1890 – School of Arts and Crafts and Decorative Arts;
- 1929 – S. Shchepanovskyi State Technical School;
- 1938 – State Institute of Plastic Arts;
- 1940 – State Art and Industrial School. During the Second World War, the School of Artistic Crafts was founded at the school, where they taught in Ukrainian and Polish (director Y. Stazhynskyi);
- 1944 – Art and Industrial School, and then the School of Applied Arts;
- 1949 – School of Applied Arts;
- 1956 – named after Ivan Trush;
- 1993 – Ivan Trush State College of Decorative and Applied Arts.
- 1997 – the current name.

The educational process takes place in a building built in 1909 by Władysław Sadłowski. At the college, students study at the departments of sculpture; art painting, ceramics, metal, wood, and weaving; embroidery and fashion design; painting restoration; graphic design; and architectural environment design.

In 1956, the Museum of Student Works was founded and renovated in 2010.

== Directors ==
- 1876–1893 — Vintsentii Chirshnits
- 1893–1903 — Zygmunt Gorgolewski
- 1903–1908 — Zygmunt Hendel
- 1908–1915 — Vladyslav Klapkovskyi,
- 1920–1929 — Valerian Krytsynskyi,
- 1923–1929 — Jan Nalborczyk
- 1937–1939 — Zygmunt Harland
- 1941–1944 — Yevhen Nahirnyi, Mykhailo Osinchuk, and Vasyl Krychevskyi
- 1944–1946 — A. Kurenko
- 1946–1947 — Hennadii Leonov
- 1947–1951 — V. Pron
- 1951–1975 — V. Tarasov
- 1975–2003 — Bohdan Kotsai
- 2003–2017 — Vasyl Otkovych
- Olha Kotsovska – at present

== Bibliography ==
- Ваврух М. Львівський державний коледж декоративного і ужиткового мистецтва ім. І. Труша // Енциклопедія Львова: в 4 т / за ред. А. Козицького. — Львів : Літопис, 2010. — Т. 4: Л-М. — С. 332. — Енциклопедія Львова_т.4 прим. — ISBN 978-966-7007-23-4.
- Львівське училище прикладного мистецтва ім. І. Труша. — Львів : Облполіграфвидав, 1987. — 18 с.
- Трофимлюк В. Наші магістралі (1944—1945 рр. і по сьогодні) // «Карби». Додаток до журналу «Образотворче мистецтво». — 2002. — № 1. — С. 41—45.
- Шмагало Р. Історичний шлях Художньо-промислової школи у Львові // Бюлетень Львівського філіалу Національного науково-дослідного реставраційного центру України. — 2006. — № 2 (8).
- Grankin P. Lwowska Szkoła Przemysłowa: dzieje gmachów na tle historii zakładu // Schola Architecturae. Budynki szkół architektury. — Wrocław : Wydawnictwo Politechniki Wrocławskiej, 2005. — S. 31—46.
- Lewicki J. Między tradycją a nowoczesnością: architektura Lwowa lat 1893—1918. — Warszawa : Neriton, 2005. — S. 77—82. — ISBN 978-83-88372-29-2.
