= Horodok urban hromada, Lviv Oblast =

Urban hromada in Lviv Oblast, Ukraine

Horodok urban hromada Городоцька міська громада
- Hromada
- Seal
- Interactive map of Horodok urban hromada
- Coordinates: 49°47′05″N 23°40′47″E
- Country: Ukraine
- Oblast: Lviv Oblast
- Raion: Lviv Raion
- Admin. center: Horodok, Lviv Oblast

Area
  - Total: 375.9 km^{2} (145.1 sq mi)

Population (2022)
  - Total: 39,526
  - Density: 105.2/km^{2} (272.3/sq mi)
- CATOTTG code: UA46060070000047720

Horodok urban territorial hromada (Ukrainian: Городоцька міська територіа́льна грома́да, romanized: Horodotska miska terytorialna hromada) is a hromada (municipality) in Ukraine, in Lviv Raion of Lviv Oblast. The administrative center is the city of Horodok.

The area of the hromada is 375.9 square kilometres (145.1 mi^{2}), and the population is 39,526 (2022 estimate).

Until 18 July 2020, the hromada belonged to Horodok Raion. The raion was abolished in July 2020 as part of the administrative reform of Ukraine, which reduced the number of raions of Lviv Oblast to seven. The area of Horodok Raion was merged into Lviv Raion.

== Settlements ==
The hromada consists of 1 city (Horodok) and 38 villages:

- Artyshchiv
- Bar
- Bartativ
- Bratkovychi
- Velyka Kalynka
- Vovchukhy
- Volya-Bartativska
- Halychany
- Hodvyshnya
- Hradivka
- Dobryany
- Dolynyany
- Drozdovychi
- Dubanevychi
- Zavereshytsa
- Zaluzhya
- Zelenyi Hai
- Zushytsi
- Kernytsia
- Lisnovychi
- Lyubovychi
- Mavkovychi
- Mylchytsi
- Myliatyn
- Moloshky
- Mshana
- Pidmohylka
- Poberezhne
- Povitno
- Putyatychi
- Rechychany
- Rodatychi
- Stodilky
- Tuchapy
- Uhry
- Cherlyany
- Cherlyanske Peredmistya
- Sholomynychi
