= Horodok Raion, Lviv Oblast =

Former subdivision of Lviv Oblast, Ukraine

Horodok Raion Городоцький район
- Raion
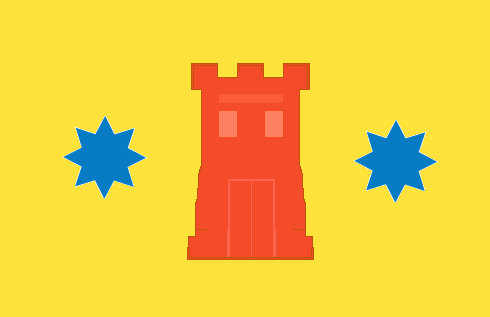
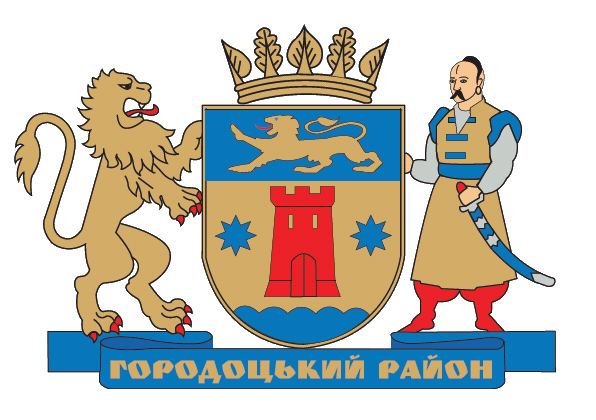
- Flag Coat of arms

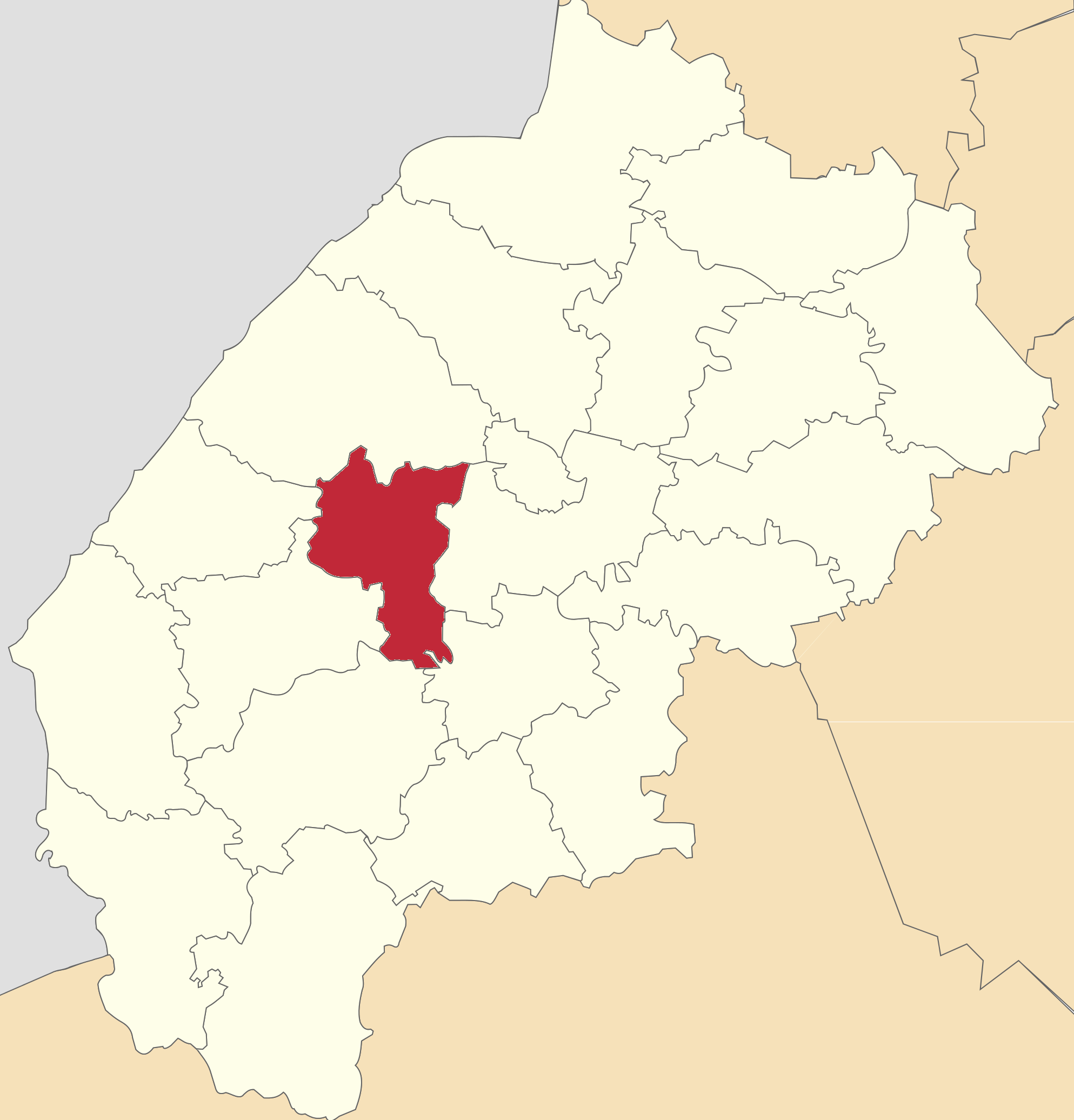
- Coordinates: 49°42′54″N 23°38′57″E
- Country: Ukraine
- Region: Lviv Oblast
- Established: 1939
- Disestablished: 18 July 2020
- Admin. center: Horodok
- Subdivisions: List: — city councils; — settlement councils; — rural councils; Number of localities: — cities; — urban-type settlements; 77 — villages; — rural settlements

Area
  - Total: 727 km^{2} (281 sq mi)

Population (2020)
  - Total: 68,428
  - Density: 94.1/km^{2} (244/sq mi)
- Time zone: UTC+02:00 (EET)
  - Summer (DST): UTC+03:00 (EEST)
- Postal index: 81500—81574
- Area code: 380-3231
- Website: https://web.archive.org/web/20090807092139/http://www.gorodok-vlada.gov.ua/engine/ Horodotskyi Raion

Horodok Raion (Ukrainian: Городоцький район) was a raion (district) in Lviv Oblast in western Ukraine. Its administrative center was the city of Horodok. The area of the district was 727 square kilometres (281 sq mi). It bordered with Yavoriv, Pustomyty, Mykolaiv, Drohobych, Sambir, and Mostyska raions. The raion was abolished on 18 July 2020 as part of the administrative reform of Ukraine, which reduced the number of raions of Lviv Oblast to seven. The area of Horodok Raion was merged into newly established Lviv Raion. The last estimate of the population of the raion was 68,428 (2020 est.).

It was established in 1939.

At the time of disestablishment, the raion consisted of three hromadas:

- Horodok urban hromada with the administration in Horodok;
- Komarno urban hromada with the administration in the city of Komarno;
- Velykyi Liubin settlement hromada with the administration in the urban-type settlement of Velykyi Liubin.
