= Lviv Raion =

Subdivision of Lviv Oblast, Ukraine

Lviv Raion Львівський район
- Raion
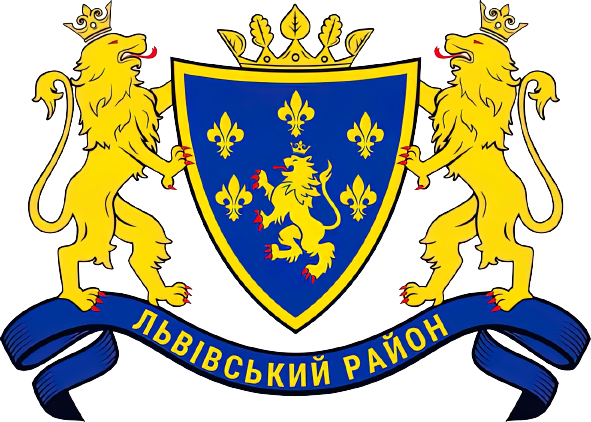
- Flag Coat of arms

- Interactive map of Lviv Raion
- Country: Ukraine
- Oblast: Lviv
- Established: 2020
- Admin. center: Lviv
- Subdivisions: 23 hromadas

Area
  - Total: 4,976.2 km^{2} (1,921.3 sq mi)

Population (2022)
  - Total: 1,141,119
  - Density: 229.32/km^{2} (593.92/sq mi)
- Time zone: UTC+02:00 (EET)
  - Summer (DST): UTC+03:00 (EEST)
- Postal index: N/A

Lviv Raion (Ukrainian: Львівський район) is a raion (district) of Lviv Oblast, Ukraine. It was created on 18 July 2020 as part of Ukraine's administrative reform. The center of the region is the city of Lviv. The raion was formed by merging four abolished raions, Horodok, Peremyshliany, Pustomyty, and Zhovkva Raions, as well as Lviv Municipality and parts of Kamianka-Buzka and Zolochiv Raions. Population: 1,141,119 (2022 estimate).

== Subdivisions ==
At the time of establishment, the raion consisted of 23 hromadas:

- Bibrka urban hromada with the administration in the city of Bibrka, transferred from Peremyshliany Raion;
- Davydiv rural hromada with the administration in the selo of Davydiv, transferred from Pustomyty Raion;
- Dobrosyn-Maheriv settlement hromada with the administration in the rural settlement of Maheriv, transferred from Zhovkva Raion;
- Hlyniany urban hromada with the administration in the city of Hlyniany, transferred from Zolochiv Raion;
- Horodok urban hromada with the administration in the city of Horodok, transferred from Horodok Raion;
- Kamianka-Buzka urban hromada with the administration in the city of Kamianka-Buzka, transferred from Kamianka-Buzka Raion;
- Komarno urban hromada with the administration in the city of Komarno, transferred from Horodok Raion;
- Kulykiv settlement hromada with the administration in the rural settlement of Kulykiv, transferred from Zhovkva Raion;
- Lviv urban hromada with the administration in the city of Lviv, transferred from Lviv Municipality;
- Murovane rural hromada with the administration in the selo of Soroky-Lvivski, transferred from Pustomyty Raion;
- Novyi Yarychiv settlement hromada with the administration in the rural settlement of Novyi Yarychiv, transferred from Kamianka-Buzka Raion;
- Obroshyne rural hromada with the administration in the selo of Obroshyne, transferred from Pustomyty Raion;
- Peremyshliany urban hromada with the administration in the city of Peremyshliany, transferred from Peremyshliany Raion;
- Pidberiztsi rural hromada with the administration in the selo of Pidberiztsi, transferred from Pustomyty Raion;
- Pustomyty urban hromada with the administration in the city of Pustomyty, transferred from Pustomyty Raion;
- Rava-Ruska urban hromada with the administration in the city of Rava-Ruska, transferred from Zhovkva Raion;
- Shchyrets settlement hromada with the administration in the rural settlement of Shchyrets, transferred from Pustomyty Raion;
- Sokilnyky rural hromada with the administration in the selo of Sokilnyky, transferred from Pustomyty Raion;
- Solonka rural hromada with the administration in the selo of Solonka, transferred from Pustomyty Raion;
- Velykyi Liubin settlement hromada with the administration in the rural settlement of Velykyi Liubin, transferred from Horodok Raion;
- Zhovkva urban hromada with the administration in the city of Zhovkva, transferred from Zhovkva Raion;
- Zhovtantsi rural hromada, with the administration in the selo of Zhovtantsi, transferred from Kamianka-Buzka Raion;
- Zymna Voda rural hromada with the administration in the selo of Zymna Voda, transferred from Pustomyty Raion.
