= Potichok (river) =

River in western Ukraine

Potichok Mlynivka
- The Potichok near Horuka and Bazhanskoho streets in Sniatyn, 27 April 2022
- The area through which the Potichok flows
- Native name: Потічок (Ukrainian)

Location
- Country: Ukraine
- Oblast: Ivano-Frankivsk Oblast
- Raion: Kolomyia Raion
- Hromada: Sniatyn urban hromada

Physical characteristics
- Source
  - location: West of Stetseva
- Mouth: Prut
- Length: 14 km (8.7 mi)
- Basin size: 33.1 km^{2} (12.8 sq mi)

Basin features
- Progression: Prut → Danube → Black Sea
- Average gradient: 7.3 m/km

Potichok (Ukrainian: Потічок), also known as Mlynivka and locally in Sniatyn as Na potokakh (Ukrainian: На потоках), is a small river in western Ukraine. A left tributary of the Prut in the Danube basin, it flows through Sniatyn urban hromada in Kolomyia Raion, Ivano-Frankivsk Oblast.

The river rises west of the village of Stetseva and flows southward through Potichok and Sniatyn. It is 14 kilometres (8.7 mi) long and drains a basin of 33.1 square kilometres (12.8 sq mi).

Historically, watermills operated along the Potichok in Sniatyn and its outskirts, including Fylypovych's mill in the Balky area, which was supplied by a diversion channel. In June 2019 and June 2020, seasonal floods damaged several small bridges across the river. Contemporary environmental management measures include bank reinforcement, the demarcation of riparian buffer zones, and planned wastewater treatment facilities in the upper catchment.

== Geography ==
The Potichok rises west of Stetseva and flows mainly south through Potichok and Sniatyn before joining the Prut from the left, a course already recorded in the 1887 volume of the Geographical Dictionary of the Kingdom of Poland. In his 1897 geographical account of the Sniatyn area, Franciszek Ksawery Mroczko placed the river's mouth in Balky, an outlying part of Sniatyn, while the 1957 Catalogue of the Rivers of Ukraine locates the confluence 756 km (470 mi) upstream from the mouth of the Prut.

According to the 1957 catalogue, the Potichok is 14 km (8.7 mi) long, has a drainage basin of 33.1 km^{2} (12.8 sq mi), and has an average gradient of 7.3 m/km. Earlier sources, including the 1887 Polish geographical dictionary and Mykhailo Bazhanskyi's 1982 local history encyclopaedia Krasa Sniatynshchyny, give its length as 12 km (7.5 mi).

The Danube River Basin Management Plan for 2025–2030 divides the Potichok into a natural stretch of 13.60 km (8.45 mi) and a heavily modified stretch of 0.74 km (0.46 mi), classifying the natural section as a small upland river over siliceous geology within the Eastern Plains ecoregion.

The Potichok near Kyivska Street in the Balky area of Sniatyn, 2026

== Names and historical descriptions ==
The linguist Vasyl Yatsii derives the name of the village of Potichok from the hydronym, which originates from the Ukrainian common noun potichok (a small stream) and is related to dialectal terms for a small river, a brook, or a spring. Conversely, Mroczko's 1897 account states that the stream took its name from the village through which it flowed.

Volume VIII of the Geographical Dictionary of the Kingdom of Poland (1887) contains a separate entry for the river under the heading "Potoczek al. Młynówka" ("Potichok, or Mlynivka"), while the neighbouring entry for the village refers to the stream solely as Młynówka. Volume IX (1888) lists Potoczek among the left tributaries of the Prut alongside the Beleluika and Turetskyi Potik.

According to Bazhanskyi, the watercourse is known locally by three names along its course: Mlynivka above the village of Potichok, Potichok within the village itself, and Na potokakh in Sniatyn from the hill on Stetsevska Street onward.

== Historical use ==
Bazhanskyi records six watermills on the Potichok in Sniatyn and its outskirts, identifying them by their owners' surnames or nearby landmarks such as an oil mill and a school.

Watermills on the Potichok described by Mykhailo Bazhanskyi
Mill or owners	Location in Bazhanskyi's account
Dutchak's mill	At the end of the village of Potichok
Harbuz, Sidliarchuk and Sitkevych's mill	Before Stetsevska Road, near a steep hill
Mill near Vahil's property	Near Vahil's property
Mill near Sadovyi's oil mill	Near Aftarchuk's school
Fylypovych-Hryshchuk's mill	No separate landmark specified
Zinkovskyi and Lukavetskyi's mill	In the Na potokakh area

In Młynarstwo (1886), Tadeusz Rutowski lists Stefan Zinkowski and Mikołaj Łukawiecki as joint owners of an ordinary watermill in Sniatyn. In his description of Balky, Bazhanskyi also notes a channel that diverted water from the Potichok past the municipal slaughterhouse to Fylypovych's mill before the stream reached the Prut.

The blacksmith Isydor Symuliak had his workshop in the Na potokakh area, where townspeople also gathered on the river for the blessing of water at Epiphany, locally called Yordan.

== Floods and bank protection ==
On 15 September 2017, the Ivano-Frankivsk Oblast Council allocated ₴400,000 from additional environmental fund revenues for project documentation and bank protection works on the Potichok in the village of the same name. That year, the contractor Budhidrotekh cleared the channel and reinforced the banks; a 2019 report in Halytskyi Korespondent put the total cost of bank reinforcement in the village at over ₴1 million.

Heavy rain in early June 2019 caused a sharp rise in water levels, destroying small bridges at the junctions of Olhy Pleshkan Street with Hirna and Dzherelna streets in Sniatyn and cutting off local access. By 7 June, the municipal council reported that crews had cleared gravel and debris from the streets and restored the crossings. Flooding in June 2020 again damaged a small bridge over the Potichok in Sniatyn; by 21 August, contractors were completing repairs funded from the state budget reserve fund as part of a wider programme to restore three small bridges in the Sniatyn area.

== Water protection ==
A 2020 risk assessment included in the Danube River Basin Management Plan found no risk that the natural stretch of the Potichok would fail to achieve good ecological and chemical status. For the heavily modified stretch, however, it identified a risk of failing to achieve good ecological potential and postponed that target until after 2030 for technical reasons.

The 2025–2030 programme of measures proposes building a sewerage network and a mechanical-biological wastewater treatment plant in Stetseva that would discharge treated effluent into the Potichok. Designed to treat 850 cubic metres (30,000 cu ft) of wastewater per day and serve roughly 3,400 residents, the project is overseen by the Sniatyn municipal council and had an indicative 2023 cost estimate of ₴27.2 million pending design and cost documentation.

In September 2026, the State Environmental Inspectorate of the Carpathian District directed the Sniatyn municipal council to delineate and mark riparian buffer zones, including along the Potichok, and to enter their boundaries into the State Land Cadastre by 31 January 2027.

== Sources ==
- Bazhanskyi, Mykhailo (1982). Краса Снятинщини: Ріки, потоки, ліси, луги, сади, міста і села та висока матеріяльна і духовна культура їхніх жителів: Гаслова енциклопедія [The Beauty of the Sniatyn Region: Rivers, Streams, Forests, Meadows, Gardens, Towns and Villages, and the Material and Spiritual Culture of Their Inhabitants: An Encyclopaedia] (PDF). Biblioteka vydavnytstva "Sniatyn", issue 6 (in Ukrainian). Detroit: Sniatyn.
- Каталог річок України [Catalogue of the Rivers of Ukraine] (PDF) (in Ukrainian). Compiled by H. I. Shvets, N. I. Drozd and S. P. Levchenko; edited by V. I. Mokliak. Kyiv: Publishing House of the Academy of Sciences of the Ukrainian SSR. 1957.
- План управління річковим басейном Дунаю на 2025–2030 роки [Danube River Basin Management Plan for 2025–2030] (PDF) (Report) (in Ukrainian). State Agency of Water Resources of Ukraine. 2024.
- "Potoczek al. Młynówka". Słownik geograficzny Królestwa Polskiego i innych krajów słowiańskich (in Polish). Vol. 8. Warsaw. 1887. p. 863.
- "Prut". Słownik geograficzny Królestwa Polskiego i innych krajów słowiańskich (in Polish). Vol. 9. Warsaw. 1888. p. 108.
- "У Снятині відновили проїзди через потічок" [Crossings over the Stream Restored in Sniatyn]. Halychyna (in Ukrainian). 7 June 2019.
- "Мільйон на озеленення інтернату та фірми під опікою: Як освоїли екологічні кошти на Снятинщині" [A Million for Landscaping a Boarding School and Favoured Companies: How Environmental Funds Were Spent in the Sniatyn Area]. Halytskyi Korespondent (in Ukrainian). 3 June 2019.
- "Про фінансування природоохоронних заходів за рахунок понадпланових річних надходжень у 2017 році до обласного фонду охорони навколишнього природного середовища" [On Funding Environmental Measures from Additional Annual Revenue to the Regional Environmental Protection Fund in 2017] (Decision No. 596-17/2017) (in Ukrainian). Ivano-Frankivsk Oblast Council. 15 September 2017.
- Mroczko, Franciszek Ksawery (1897). Śniatyńszczyzna. Przyczynek do etnografii krajowej [The Sniatyn Region: A Contribution to Regional Ethnography] (PDF) (in Polish). Vol. 1. Lwów: Z drukarni Władysława Łozińskiego.
- Додаток 11. Повний перелік заходів для суббасейну Пруту та Сірету [Appendix 11: Full Programme of Measures for the Prut and Siret Sub-basin] (PDF) (Report). Danube River Basin Management Plan for 2025–2030 (in Ukrainian). 2024.
- Rutowski, Tadeusz (1886). Młynarstwo [Milling] (PDF). Rocznik statystyki przemysłu i handlu krajowego, year 1, part 1 (in Polish). Lwów: Krajowe Biuro Statystyczne.
- "На Снятинщині завершують ремонт трьох містків" [Repairs to Three Small Bridges Near Completion in the Sniatyn Area]. Suspilne Ivano-Frankivsk (in Ukrainian). 21 August 2020.
- Yatsii, Vasyl O. (2015). Shulhach, V. P. (ed.). Ойконімія Івано-Франківської області: історико-етимологічний словник [Settlement Names of Ivano-Frankivsk Oblast: A Historical and Etymological Dictionary] (PDF) (in Ukrainian). Kyiv: Naukova Dumka. ISBN 978-966-00-1487-9.
- "У Снятинській громаді екоінспекція перевірила охорону довкілля та використання природних ресурсів" [Environmental Inspectorate Checks Environmental Protection and Natural Resource Use in Sniatyn Hromada]. Zakhidnyi Kurier (in Ukrainian). 16 September 2026.
