= Dubina =

Dubina or Dubyna (Cyrillic: Дубина) may refer to

- Dubina (surname)
- Dubina, Texas, an unincorporated community in the United States
- Dubyna, Skole Raion, a village in Skole Raion, Lviv Oblast, Western Ukraine
- Dubyna, Brody Raion, a village in Brodivskyi Raion, Lviv Oblast, western Ukraine
