= Khyshevychi =

Khyshevychi Хишевичі
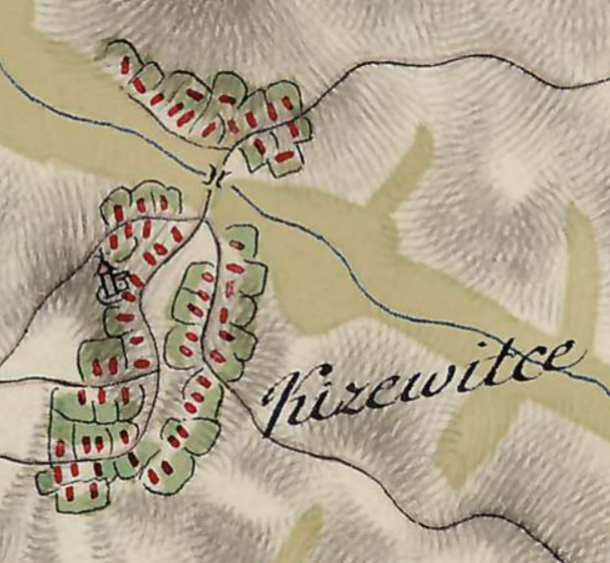
- Khyshevychi on a topographic map by Friedrich von Mieg, late 18th century.

- Location in Lviv Oblast Khyshevychi (Ukraine)
- Coordinates: 49°40′38″N 23°36′24″E
- Country: Ukraine
- Oblast: Lviv Oblast
- Raion: Lviv Raion
- Hromada: Velykyi Liubin Hromada

Population (2018)
  - Total: ▼511
- Time zone: UTC+2 (EET)
  - Summer (DST): UTC+3 (EEST)
- Postal code: 81543

Khyshevychi (Ukrainian: Хишевичі, Polish: Chiszewice) is a village in Ukraine, Lviv Oblast, Lviv Raion, Velykyi Liubin Hromada.

== History ==
The first written mention is from 1425.

== Religion ==
- Saint Fylyp the Apostle church (1918; UGCC; brick)

== Notable residents ==
=== Born ===
- Yevhen Zhelekhivskyi (1844—1885), Ukrainian lexicographer, folklorist, public figure
- Ivan Yovyk (1918—2005), Ukrainian military and public figure, writer-memoirist
- Ivan Tsiapka, lawyer, public figure
- Andrii Fylypchuk (1989—2023), Ukrainian archaeologist, scientist, historian, and military officer
- Yakiv Chornii (1914—1944), UPA military leader, chorunzhiy, first commander of the 6th Military District, which belonged to the Western Operational Group.

=== Resident ===
- Mykhailo Fylypchuk (1955—2016), Ukrainian historian, archaeologist, researcher of Plisnesk; burial place
