= Vasyl Pylypyuk =

Ukrainian photo artist (1950–2017)

- Василь Васильович Пилип'юк
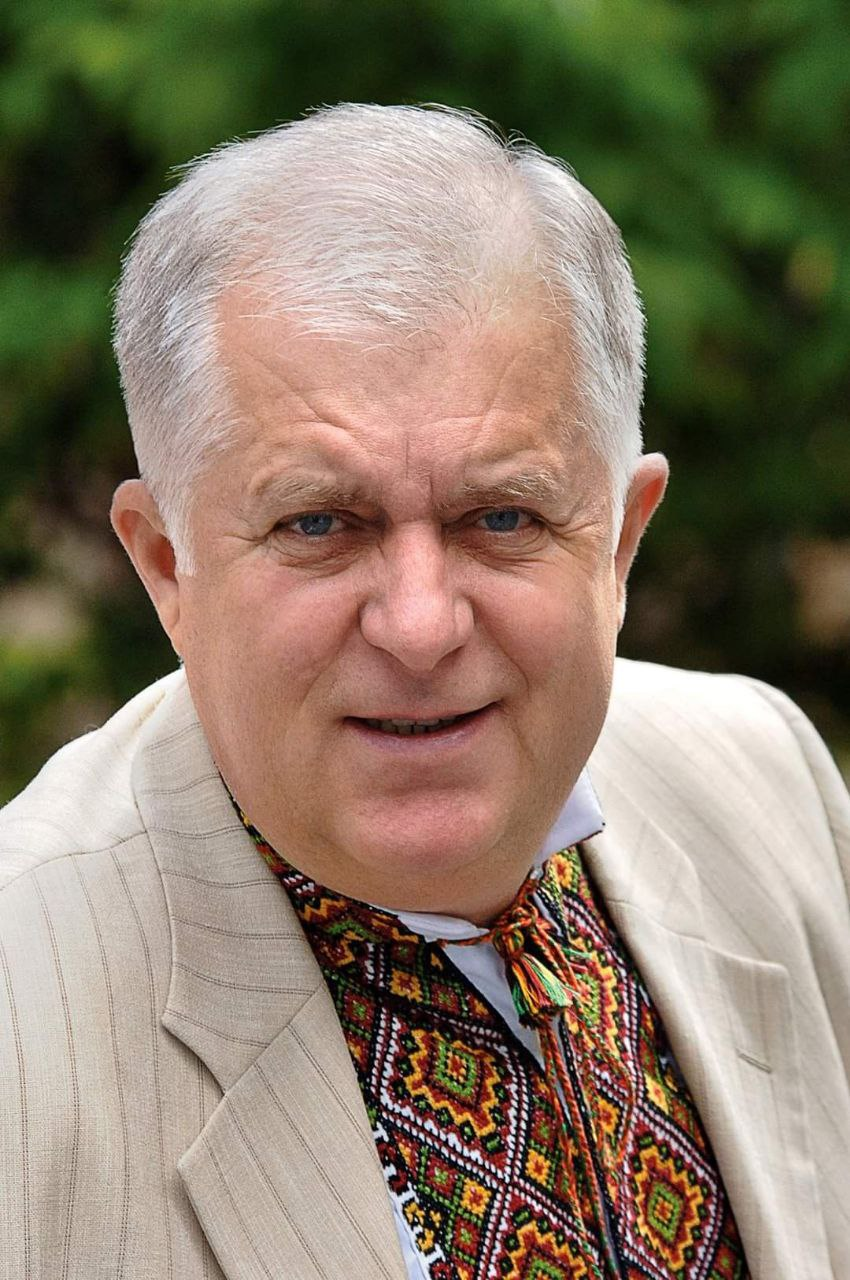
- Born: 10 January 1950; Novoselytsia, Ukrainian SSR, Soviet Union
- Died: 18 November 2017 (aged 67)
- Education: University of Lviv
- Occupation: Photo artist
- Awards: Shevchenko National Prize, Order of Merit, and others

Vasyl Pylypyuk (Ukrainian: Василь Васильович Пилип'юк; 10 January 1950 – 18 November 2017) was a Ukrainian photo artist.

In 2015, he became a professor. He was a member of the National Union of Journalists of Ukraine, and in 2007 he became an artist of the Fédération Internationale de l'Art Photographique. Member of the Presidium and Board of the .National Union of Photographers of Ukraine.

From 1999 he was an Honorary Doctor of the Ukrainian Academy of Printing, in the same year he became an academician of the National Academy of Human Problems; from 2009 he was an honorary professor at the Hamburg Academy of Arts, and from 2013 he was an honorary professor at the Hetman Petro Sahaidachnyi National Ground Forces Academy, and from 2016 he was an honorary professor at the Mykola Lysenko Lviv National Music Academy. In 2016, he became a member of the Expert Council of the Taras Shevchenko Art Museum in Beijing. In 2017, he became an honorary academician of the National Academy of Arts of Ukraine.

== Biography ==
Vasyl Pylypiuk was born on 10 January 1950 in Novoselytsia, now Sniatyn Hromada, Kolomyia Raion, Ivano-Frankivsk Oblast, Ukraine.

In 1974 he graduated from the Faculty of Journalism at the University of Lviv. After graduation, he worked for the district newspapers of Sniatyn and Verkhovyna in the Ivano-Frankivsk Oblast; and for the Ivano-Frankivsk Oblast newspaper.

In Lviv, he worked for the newspaper "Lvivskyi Zaliznychnyk" and also collaborated with other publications. In 1973–1989, he was a correspondent for "Ukraina" magazine and the English-language edition of "Ukraine". In 1990, he became the editor-in-chief of "Svitlo y Tin" magazine, and later founded and headed a private publishing company of the same name.

In 1992–1995 he worked as a personal photographer for Ukrainian President Leonid Kravchuk.

In 1999, he founded the first Ukrainian photo gallery, which in 2009 opened the first international salon of art photography "Svitlo y Shin – 2009" under the auspices of the Fédération Internationale de l'Art Photographique.

In 2007, he began working as an docent and later became a professor at the Department of Theory and Methods of Journalistic Creativity at the Faculty of Journalism of the Stepan Demianchuk International University of Economics and Humanities in Rivne. He is the founder of the author's school of photography, where he studied the development of photography in Galicia at the turn of the 19th and 20th centuries.

In 2011, he started working at the Lviv National Academy of Arts, where in 2015 he became a professor at the Department of Art Management. In 2016, he became the Head of the Department of Photography at the Kyiv National University of Culture and Arts.

He died on 18 November 2017 in Rivne. He was buried in the Lychakiv Cemetery in Lviv.

== Creativity ==
He is the author of 45 scientific and educational works; about 2000 creative works, which he has exhibited at 100 exhibitions since 1969. He also had more than 80 solo exhibitions. The works are kept in the collections of museums and galleries around the world.

He has published over 115 art photo albums, including: «Lviv», «Zhyvytsia», «Do tebe polynut», «Piieta v kameni», «Lvivskyi derzhavnyi akademichnyi teatr opery ta baletu im. I. Franka», «Lvivshchyna», «Rovenshchyna», «V kraiu Cheremosha y Pruta», «U svit shyrokyi», «Drevnii Halych», «Lviv. Pory roku», «Dlia tebe, Lvove, ya zhyvu!», «Zemle Frankova, vkloniaius tobi! Lvivshchyna», «Ukraino, ty dlia mene dyvo!», «Svitovidchuttia epokhy», «Svitlopys dushi», «Doleiu darovani zustrichi».

== Awards ==
- 1993 – Shevchenko National Prize
- 1998 – Honored Art Worker of Ukraine
- 2000 – Order of Merit, 3rd degree
- 2000 – silver medal of the National Academy of Arts of Ukraine
- 2001 – Order for Labor Achievements, 4th degree, international open rating "Golden Fortune"
- 2009 – gold medal of the National Union of Journalists of Ukraine

Prizes:

- 1981 – Oleksandr Havryliuk
- 1988 – Mykola Ostrovskyi
- 2004 – International Golden Icarus
- 2000 – Bohdan Kotyk and Ivan Krypiakevych
- 2009 – Marko Cheremshyna
- 2010 – Roman Fedoriv
- 2013 – Bohdan Khmelnytskyi for the best coverage of military topics in works of literature and art
- 2016 - Panteleimon Kulish

In 2013, he became an honorary citizen of Novoselytsia, and in 2016, Horodets, Sarny Raion, Rivne Oblast.

== Honoring the memory ==
In 2016, in his native village of Pylypyuk, the Sniatyn Raion Museum of Vasyl Pylypyuk's work was opened.

== Bibliography ==
- Шевченківські лауреати. 1962–2007 : енциклопедичний довідник / автор-упор. М. Г. Лабінський ; вступ. слова І. М. Дзюби, Р. М. Лубківського. — 2-ге вид., змін. і доп. — К. : Криниця, 2007. — 768 с. — ISBN 978-966-7575-81-6. — С. 465–466.
- Почесні імена України — еліта держави: Довідково-біографічне видання / Автор-упорядник Ярослав Білейчук. — Том 2. — К.: Логос Україна, 2013. — С. 96–97.
- Василь Пилип'юк. Біобібліографічний покажчик: Науково-довідкове видання. — Львів: Львівська національна наукова бібліотека України імені В. Стефаника, 2013. — С. 496.
- Митець національної світлини. Національна еліта / Автор-упорядник Степан Голубка. — Львів: Світло й Тінь, 2013. — C. 288.
