= Włodzimierz Zagórski =

Włodzimierz Zagórski may refer to:

- Włodzimierz Zagórski (general) (1882–1927), Polish general
- Włodzimierz Zagórski (writer) (1834–1902), Polish writer, satirist; pseudonyms Chochlik, Publikola
