= Novoselytsia, Kolomyia Raion, Ivano-Frankivsk Oblast =

Rural locality in Ivano-Frankivsk Oblast, Ukraine

Novoselytsia Новоселиця
- Location in Ivano-Frankivsk Oblast Novoselytsia (Ukraine)
- Coordinates: 48°22′40″N 25°15′58″E
- Country: Ukraine
- Oblast: Ivano-Frankivsk Oblast
- Raion: Kolomyia Raion
- Hromada: Sniatyn urban hromada
- Time zone: UTC+2 (EET)
  - Summer (DST): UTC+3 (EEST)
- Postal code: 78355

Novoselytsia (Ukrainian: Новоселиця, Polish: Nowosielica) is a village in the Sniatyn urban hromada of the Kolomyia Raion of Ivano-Frankivsk Oblast in Ukraine.

== History ==
The first written mention of the village was in 1537.

In the Second Polish Republic, the village was located in the Śniatyn County of the Stanisławów Voivodeship. There were two coal mines here. In 1944, Ukrainian nationalists from the OUN-UPA murdered 72 Poles in the village, part of Volhynia genocide.

On 19 July 2020, as a result of the administrative-territorial reform and liquidation of the Sniatyn Raion, the village became part of the Kolomyia Raion.

== Religion ==
- Church of the Presentation of Virgin Mary (1889, wooden, OCU)
- Saint Nicholas church (1847, wooden, OCU)
- Church of the Visitation of the Virgin Mary (1882, dismantled 1949, RCC)

== Notable residents ==
- Vasyl Pylypyuk (1950–2017), Ukrainian photographer

== Bibliografia ==
- "Nowosielica, wś, powiat śniatyński". Geographical Dictionary of the Kingdom of Poland (in Polish). 7. Warszawa: Kasa im. Józefa Mianowskiego. 1886. p. 275.
