= Velykyi Liubin =

Rural locality in Lviv Oblast, Ukraine

Velykyi Liubin Великий Любінь
- Rural settlement
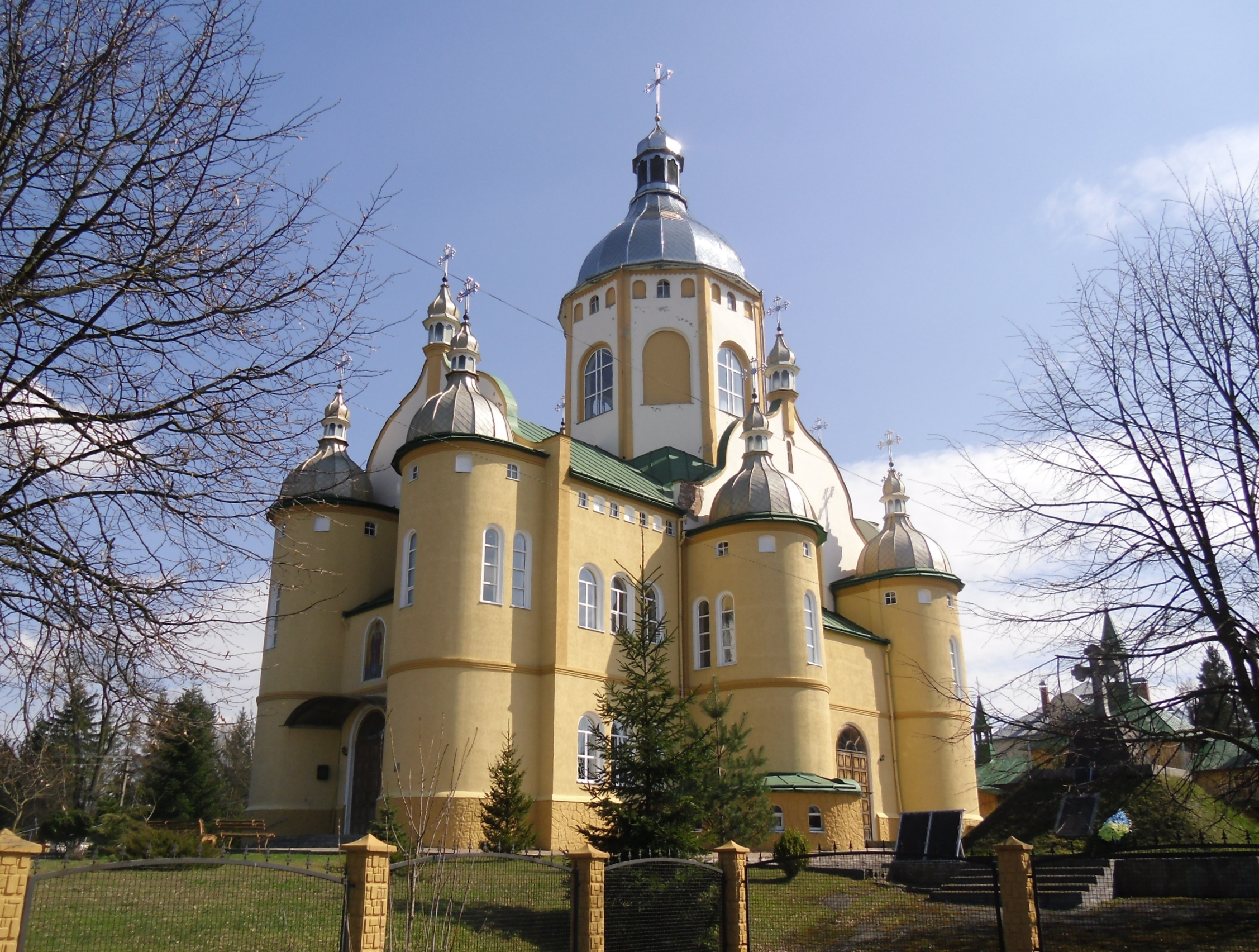
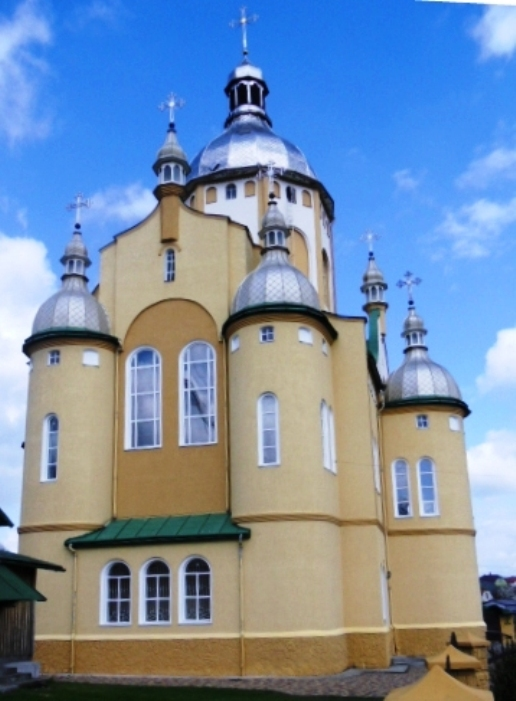
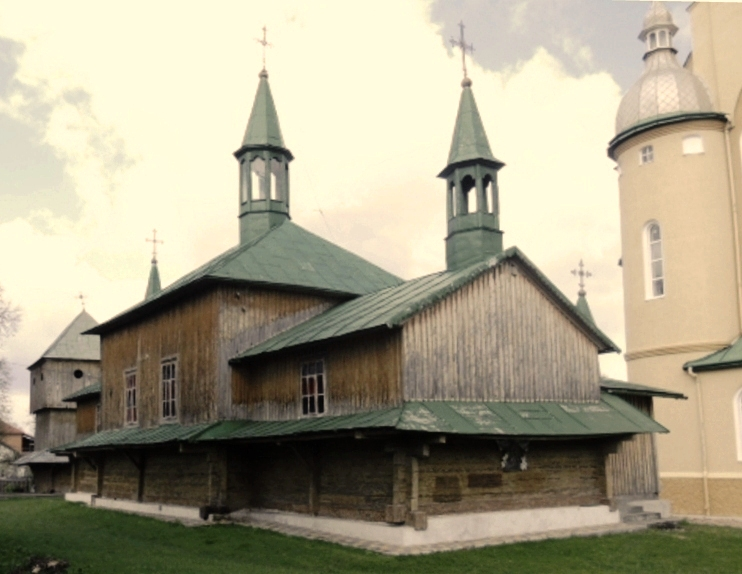
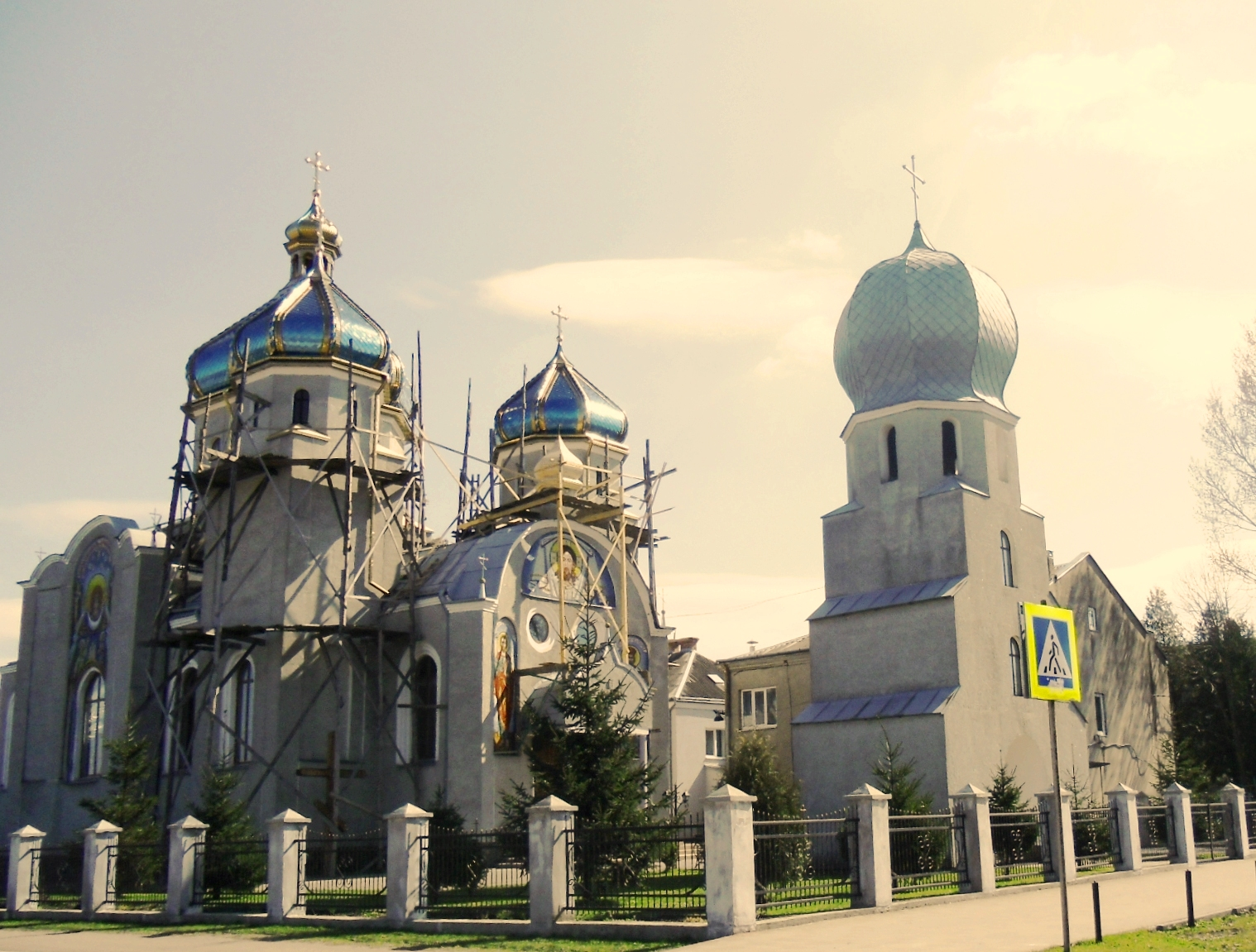
- From Upper left: (1,2) St. Nicholas Greek Orthodox Church; (3) The wooden Greek Catholic Church of St. Nicholas, 1854; (4) Ukrainian Orthodox Church of St.Nicholas the Wonderworker.

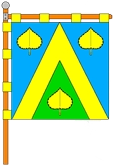
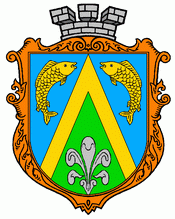
- Flag Coat of arms

- Location within Lviv Oblast Location within Ukraine
- Coordinates: 49°43′26″N 23°44′01″E
- Country: Ukraine
- Oblast: Lviv Oblast
- Raion: Lviv Raion
- Hromada: Velykyi Liubin settlement hromada
- Established: 13th century

Area
  - Total: 3,345 km^{2} (1,292 sq mi)
- Elevation /(average value of): 275 m (902 ft)

Population (2022)
  - Total: 4,528
  - Density: 1.354/km^{2} (3.506/sq mi)
- Time zone: UTC+2 (EET)
  - Summer (DST): UTC+3 (EEST)
- Postal code: 81556; 81555
- Area code: +380 3231
- Website: Великий Любінь, Офіційний сайт громади^{(Ukrainian)}

Velykyi Liubin (Ukrainian: Великий Любінь; Polish: Lubień Wielki) is a rural settlement in Lviv Raion, Lviv Oblast, western Ukraine. The settlement has a balneological and cardiological resort and sanatorium. It hosts the administration of Velykyi Liubin settlement hromada, one of the hromadas of Ukraine. Local government is administered by Velykoliubinska Settlement Council. Population: 4,528 (2022 estimate).

== Geography ==
The settlement Velykyi Liubin is located along the Highway Ukraine ( H 13) – Lviv – Sambir – Uzhhorod. Distance from the regional center Lviv is the 28 kilometres (17 mi), 16 kilometres (9.9 mi) from the district center Horodok and 284 kilometres (176 mi) from Uzhhorod.

== History ==
The area of the settlement totals is 33.45 km^{2} and the population is about 4550 people.

Until 18 July 2020, Velykyi Liubin belonged to Horodok Raion. The raion was abolished in July 2020 as part of the administrative reform of Ukraine, which reduced the number of raions of Lviv Oblast to seven. The area of Horodok Raion was merged into Lviv Raion.

Until 26 January 2024, Velykyi Liubin was designated urban-type settlement. On this day, a new law entered into force which abolished this status, and Velykyi Liubin became a rural settlement.

== Religious structures and attractions ==
In the settlement there are three religious communities. This religious community of the Ukrainian Greek Catholic Church, Religious Community of the Ukrainian Orthodox Church of the Kyivan Patriarchate and Religious Community of the Roman Catholic Church.
At today in the settlement is the wooden Greek Catholic Church, St. Nicholas Greek Orthodox Church (2000), Church of St. Nicholas the Wonderworker and Roman Catholic Church of Our Lady of Częstochowa (1930–1932).

== Literature ==
- Історія міст і сіл УРСР : Львівська область, Городоцький район, Великий Любінь. – К. : ГРУРЕ, 1968 р. Page 227 (in Ukrainian)
