= Włodzimierz Zagórski (writer) =

Polish writer, satirist

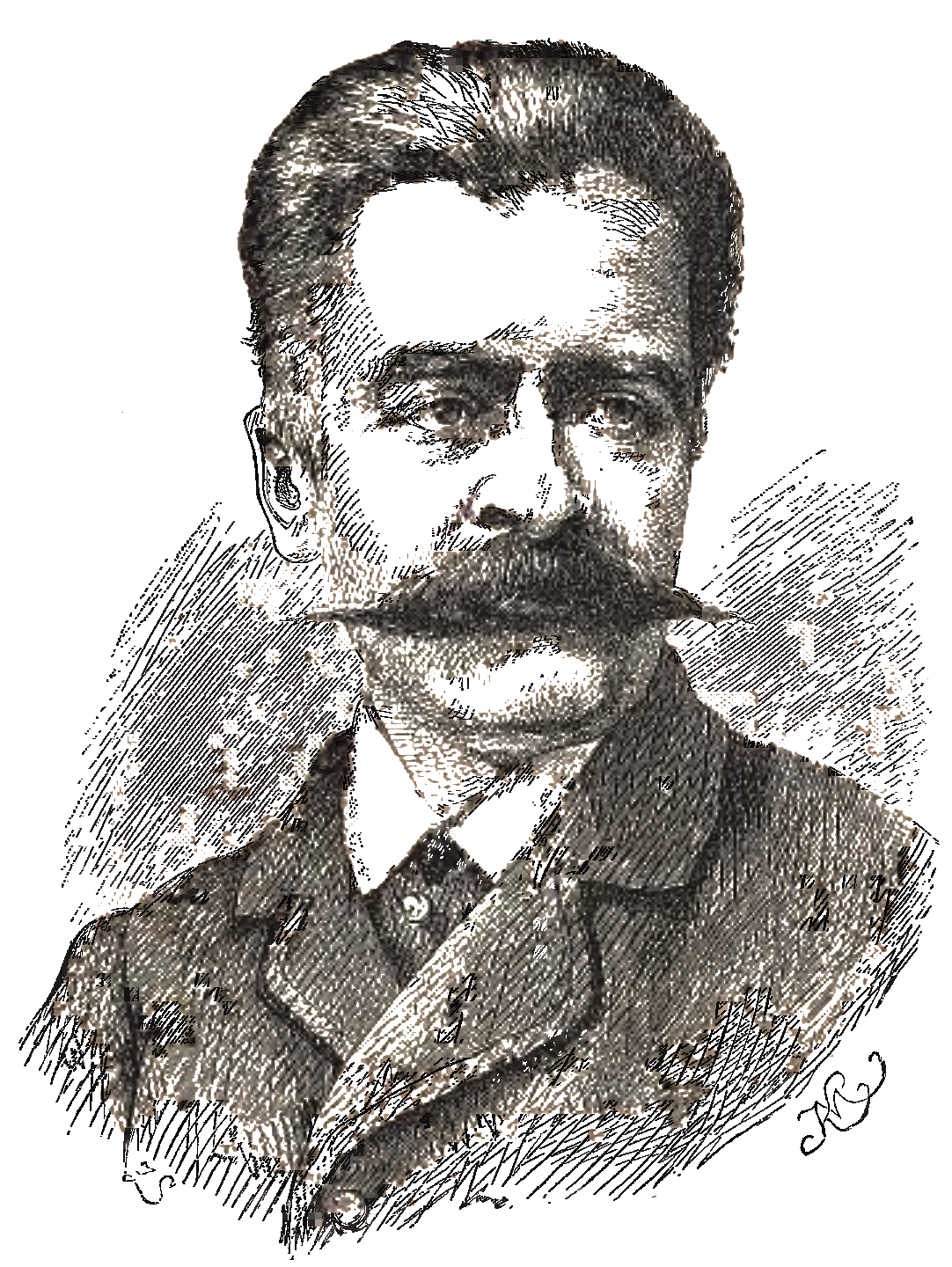
Włodzimierz Zagórski (1882)

Włodzimierz Zagórski (7 November 1834 in eastern Galicia, Luhove near Brody, then called Chekhy – 13 February 1902 in Warsaw, Poland), pseudonymes Chochlik, Publicola (or Publikola), was a Polish writer, popular satirist, prosaist and publicist. He had been an officer of the Austrian Army.

Zagórski was an editor and author of publications in the satirical magazines Chochlik (1866–1868, 1871), Różowe Domino (1882–1884, 1887–1890). He was also a contributor to the magazines Kurier Codzienny and Słowa. He was the published author of poems, in Król Salomon (1887) and Wybór poezji (1899); novels Pamiętnik starego parasola (1884) and Wilcze plemię (1885); short stories and humoresques. A selection of his satirical works, festive and Bacchic songs appeared as Z teki Chochlika (vol. 1–2; 1882). A selection of his works with the same title, selected by Julian Tuwim, was published posthumously in 1953.
