= Dubie, Lviv Oblast =

Rural locality in Lviv Oblast, Ukraine

Dubie
- Village
- Location within Lviv Oblast
- Coordinates: 49°58′45.35″N 25°04′45.24″E
- Country: Ukraine
- Oblast: Lviv
- Raion: Zolochiv Raion
- Area: 1,372 km^{2} (530 sq mi)
- Population (2001): ▼683
  - Density: 497/km^{2} (1,290/sq mi)

Dubie (Ukrainian: Дуб'є) is a village (selo) in Zolochiv Raion, Lviv Oblast, in western Ukraine. It belongs to Zabolottsi rural hromada, one of the hromadas of Ukraine.

From 1918 to 1939 the village was in Tarnopol Voivodeship in Poland.

Until 18 July 2020, Dubie belonged to Brody Raion. The raion was abolished in July 2020 as part of the administrative reform of Ukraine, which reduced the number of raions of Lviv Oblast to seven. The area of Brody Raion was merged into Zolochiv Raion.

Dubie (Dubye) is part of the Yaseniv rural council (bigger Yaseniv).
