= Pisky, Lviv Raion, Lviv Oblast =

Rural locality in Lviv Oblast, Ukraine

Coordinates: 49°40′47″N 23°42′59″E

Village of Pisky село Піски
- Village
- Interactive map of Village of Pisky
- Country: Ukraine
- Founded: 1450 AD

Area
  - Total: 0.911 km^{2} (0.352 sq mi)

Population
  - Total: 56
  - Density: 79.03/km^{2} (204.7/sq mi)
- Postal code: 81556

Pisky (Ukrainian: Піски) is a village located in Lviv Raion (district) of Lviv Oblast (province) in western Ukraine. It belongs to Velykyi Liubin settlement hromada, one of the hromadas of Ukraine.

Until 18 July 2020, Pisky belonged to Horodok Raion. The raion was abolished in July 2020 as part of the administrative reform of Ukraine, which reduced the number of raions of Lviv Oblast to seven. The area of Horodok Raion was merged into Lviv Raion.

The name in Ukrainian can be interpreted literally as "the Sands".

The recent estimated population is 56.
