= Pidhirtsi =

Rural locality in Lviv Oblast, Ukraine

Pidhirtsi Підгірці
- Village
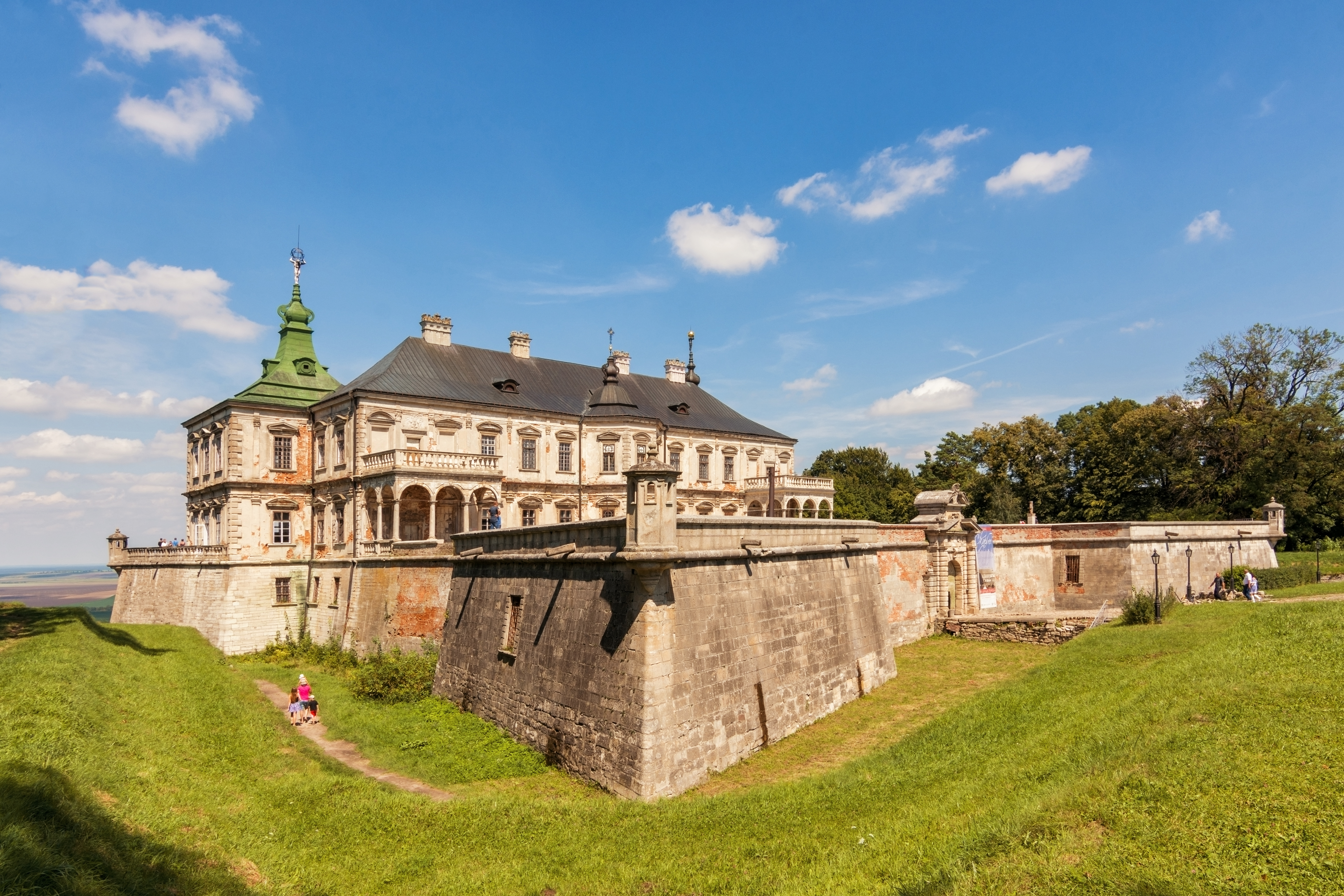
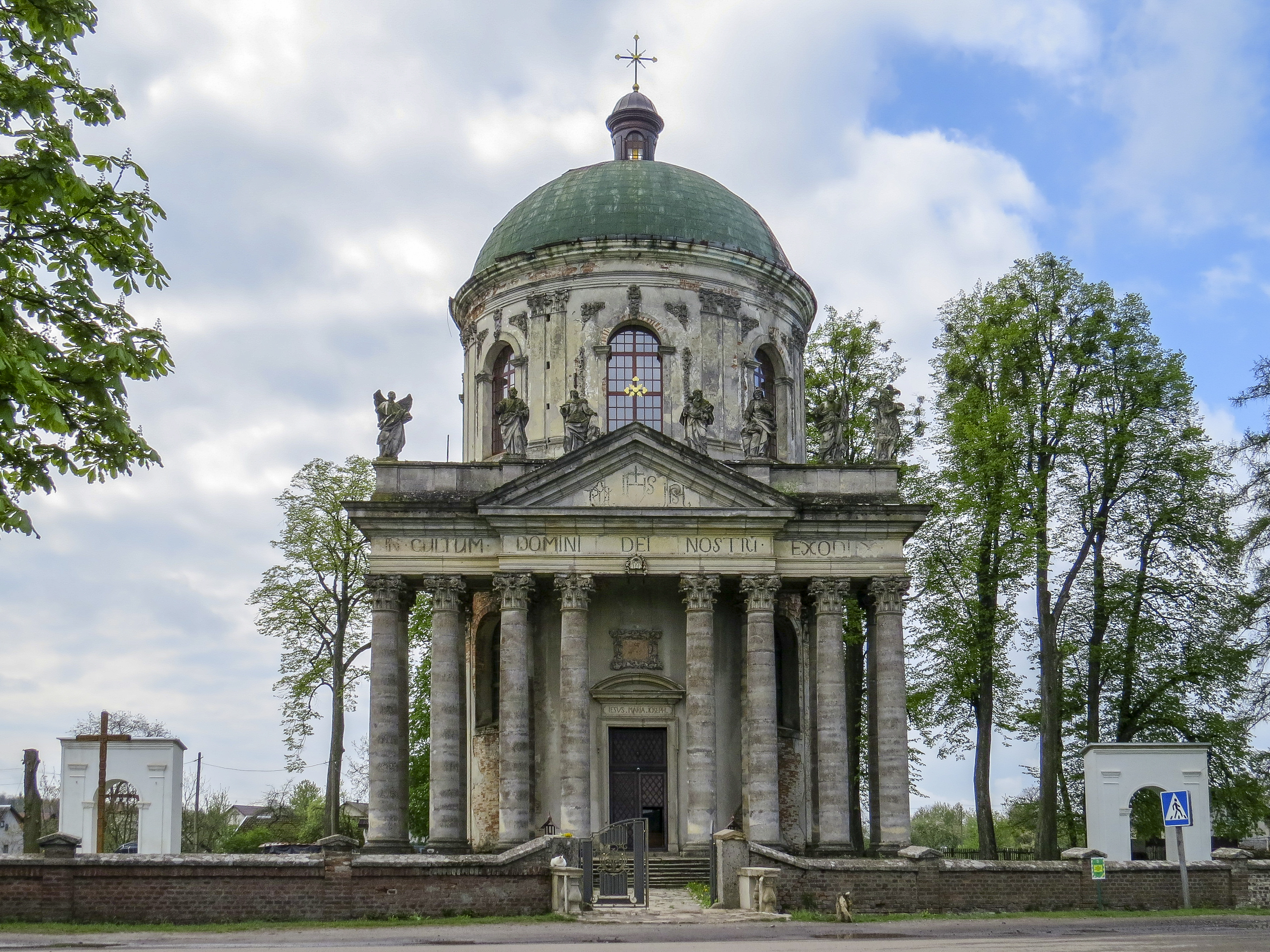
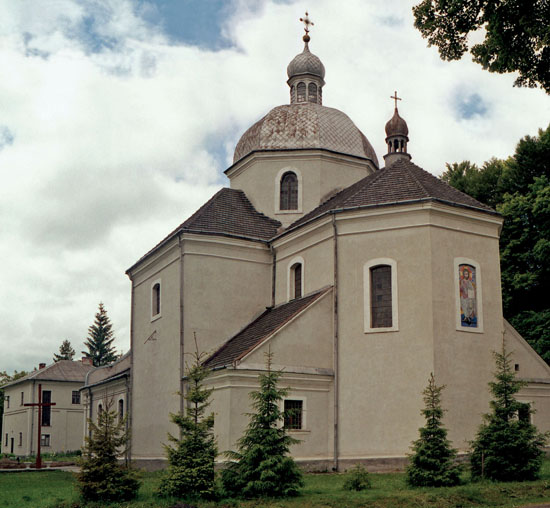
- Pidhirtsi Castle Roman Catholic church of St. Joseph St. Onuphry's church of the Pidhirtsi Monastery The

- Location in Lviv Oblast
- Coordinates: 49°56′39″N 24°58′49″E
- Country: Ukraine
- Oblast: Lviv Oblast
- Raion: Zolochiv Raion
- Hromada: Zabolottsi rural hromada

Population (2001)
  - Total: 1,076
- Time zone: UTC+2 (EET)
  - Summer (DST): UTC+3 (EEST)
- Postal code: 80660

Pidhirtsi (Ukrainian: Підгірці; Polish: Podhorce) is a village of about 1,000 inhabitants in Zolochiv Raion, Lviv Oblast of Ukraine, located about 80 km east of Lviv, 17 km south of Brody, 60 km north west of Ternopil. It belongs to Zabolottsi rural hromada, one of the hromadas of Ukraine. Known both for its castle and Basilian monastery of the Annunciation with an icon of the Mother of God.

== History ==
Although founded near a large Early Slavic gord, the first written mention of a fortified Ruthenian settlement, then called Plisnesk, comes from 1188 and 1233, found in chronicles from Kiev and Halych-Volhynia as well as in the Tale of Igor's Campaign. The first Basilian monastery is recorded to have been founded by a princess named Helen in 1180. In the 15th century it is referred to by the present-day name and in 1440 granted by king Ladislaus III of Poland to its tenant, the Podhorecki noble family. In 1635 the village was purchased by the Grand Crown Hetman Stanisław Koniecpolski, who built a fortified residence there.

In 1682 it was inherited by the Sobieski family. The Crown Field Buława Horse Regiment of the Polish Crown Army was stationed in Podhorce. During the first half of the 18th century the present complex of the Basilian monastery was constructed and in 1754 the icon was crowned by Pope Benedict XIV. In 1728 the castle was purchased by the Rzewuski family and expanded by Wacław Rzewuski, who also built the Roman Catholic Church of St. Joseph, consecrated in 1766. Finally from 1869 until 1939 the complex became the property of the Sanguszko family, who turned it into a museum. Pidhirtsi suffered heavily from the war and Soviet rule, and its collection was scattered among different museums in Poland and Ukraine. In 1997 the devastated castle was given to the Lviv Art Gallery and is gradually undergoing restoration. Worship in Polish and Ukrainian is held in St. Joseph's Church.

In 2009 the village's Basilian monastery became the site of a schism within the Ukrainian Greek Catholic Church when seven "Pidhirtsi fathers" declared the founding of the Ukrainian Orthodox Greek Catholic Church.

Until 18 July 2020, Pidhirtsi belonged to Brody Raion. The raion was abolished in July 2020 as part of the administrative reform of Ukraine, which reduced the number of raions of Lviv Oblast to seven. The area of Brody Raion was merged into Zolochiv Raion.
