= Velykyi Liubin settlement hromada =

Hromada in Lviv Oblast, Ukraine

Velykyi Liubin settlement hromada Великолюбінська селищна громада
- Hromada
- Interactive map of Velykyi Liubin settlement hromada
- Country: Ukraine
- Oblast: Lviv Oblast
- Raion: Lviv Raion
- Admin. center: Velykyi Liubin

Area
  - Total: 1,324 km^{2} (511 sq mi)

Population (2021)
  - Total: 9,473
  - Density: 7.155/km^{2} (18.53/sq mi)
- CATOTTG code: UA46060030000020652
- Settlements: 16
- Rural settlements: 1
- Villages: 15
- Website: velykolubinska-gromada.gov.ua

Velykyi Liubin settlement hromada (Ukrainian: Великолюбінська селищна громада) is a hromada in Ukraine, in Lviv Raion of Lviv Oblast. The administrative center is the rural settlement of Velykyi Liubin.

== Settlements ==
The hromada consists of 1 rural settlement (Velykyi Liubin) and 15 villages:

- Birche
- Zavydovychi
- Zaluzhany
- Zashkovychi
- Koropuzh
- Kosivets
- Malyi Liubin
- Malovanka
- Pisky
- Porichchia
- Porichchia-Hruntove
- Porichchia Zadvirne
- Romanivka
- Khyshevychi
- Chulovychi
