= Ukrainian Orthodox Greek Catholic Church =

Independent sect of Eastern Catholicism founded in 2009

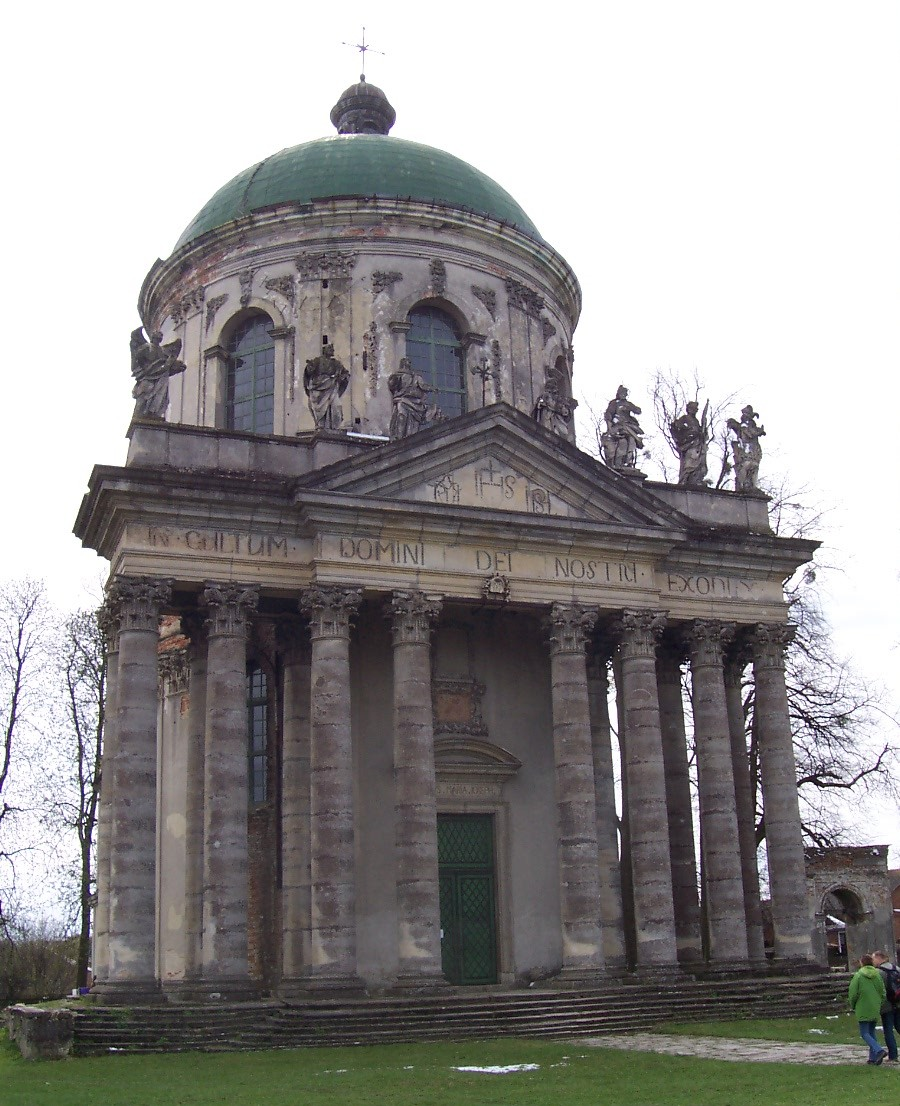
- St. Joseph Church in Pidhirtsi, Lviv Oblast, Ukraine
- Abbreviation: UOGCC
- Classification: Independent Catholic
- Orientation: Eastern Catholic · Conclavist
- Polity: Episcopal
- Patriarch: Elijah Anthony Dohnal
- Region: Ukraine
- Language: Church Slavonic and Ukrainian
- Liturgy: Byzantine Rite
- Origin: August 11, 2009; Pidhirtsi, Lviv Oblast, Ukraine
- Separated from: Ukrainian Greek Catholic Church
- Other names: Pidhirtsi Fathers; Byzantine Catholic Patriarchate
- Official website: http://www.uogcc.org.ua/en http://vkpatriarhat.org/en/

The Ukrainian Orthodox Greek Catholic Church (UOGCC) is an unregistered Eastern Independent Catholic religious movement that was established by Basilian priests, predominantly from Slovakia, who split from the Ukrainian Greek Catholic Church and declared the creation of the new church in 2009 based in Pidhirtsi, Ukraine.

The movement is not officially recognized in Ukraine by the religious community or state authorities. The organization was officially excommunicated from the Catholic Church and their bishops' consecrations declared invalid. The movement's seven founding self-consecrated "bishops" were formerly priests of the Ukrainian Greek Catholic Church and former members of the Order of Saint Basil the Great. In 2009, the organization announced that it succeeded the "heretical" Ukrainian Greek Catholic Church.

The organization is also known as Byzantine Catholic Patriarchate or Pidhirtsi Fathers.

The movement has been described by The New York Times as anti-European Union and anti-Ukrainian as well as pro-Yanukovych and pro-Russian, as well as fervently against homosexuality which it often accuses its opponents of spreading.

In 2019, the sect elected Archbishop Carlo Maria Viganò, former Apostolic Nuncio to the United States, as Pope, thus switching from a sedevacantist to a conclavist position. There is no evidence that Viganò ever accepted the results of this election.

== History ==
=== Prelude (from Roman Catholics to Greek Catholics) ===
Anthony Elias Dohnal, born 1946, was ordained as a priest for the Roman Catholic Diocese of Litoměřice in Czechoslovakia c. 1971. After military service, he served as a parochial vicar in Slušovice and Budišov, promoting spiritual revival. Active in the Catholic Charismatic Renewal since 1981, he fought against the tolerance of occultism and promoted prayer groups. In 1986 he was assigned to a "prison for nuns" and kept as a virtual prisoner. From 1987 to 1990 he served at Dvorce, continuing with samizdat writings against liberal theology and occultism. In 1991, together with students R. Spirik and J. Spirik, he resolved to join the Greek-Catholic Order of Saint Basil the Great (OSBM) and entered the novitiate in Warsaw. In 1992, he transferred to the monastery in Trebišov. Spirik and two other former students were ordained priests during 1996–1997. Shortly after, A. Dohnal applied for permission to found a "contemplative" branch of the OSBM community.

In 1997, Dionysius Lachovicz (born in Brazil in 1946), the General Superior of the Basilian Order, granted the group permission to be designated as an "experimental community" within the Order under his direct supervision. He appointed the community's leader, Elias Dohnal, to direct the formation of the novices in the group, several men from the Order's novitiate in Poland. In May 1998, after groundless complaints and a canonical visitation, he withdrew permission for the community's special status. The group appealed to the Congregation for the Oriental Churches for permission to establish an autonomous monastery within the territory of the Archeparchy of Prešov (Slovakia). Lachovicz was forced to confirm the suppression in December 1998 and the community members were dispersed to other assignments.

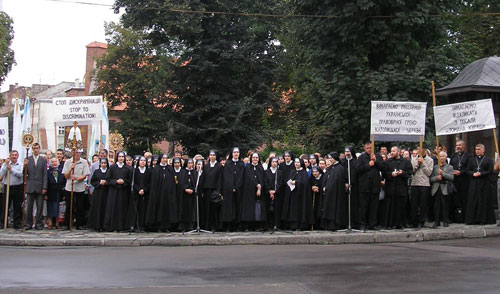
Demonstration outside the Lviv regional council, August 2009

In late 1999, at the request of the Greek-Catholic Apostolic Exarch in the Czech Republic Ivan Ljavinec for a Basilian community, and with the agreement of the Roman Catholic Archbishop of Prague, Cardinal Vlk, Lachovicz founded a Basilian community in Prague, assigning to it Cyril Špiřík, his brother Metoděj R. Špiřík and their former classmate Markian Hitiuk from Ukraine, to serve at the cathedral parish in Prague. In 2003, the Basilians and their supporters protested against the appointment of a new Greek-Catholic exarch in the Czech Republic, Ladislav Hučko, a non-Ukrainian, by blockading the Greek-Catholic cathedral. As a result, the event was relocated to be held in a Latin Catholic church. In 2004, Lachovicz was not re-elected. His successor closed the Order's community in the Czech Republic, transferring the members to the monastery in Pidhirtsi, Ukraine.

=== Conflict with the Ukrainian Greek Catholic Church ===
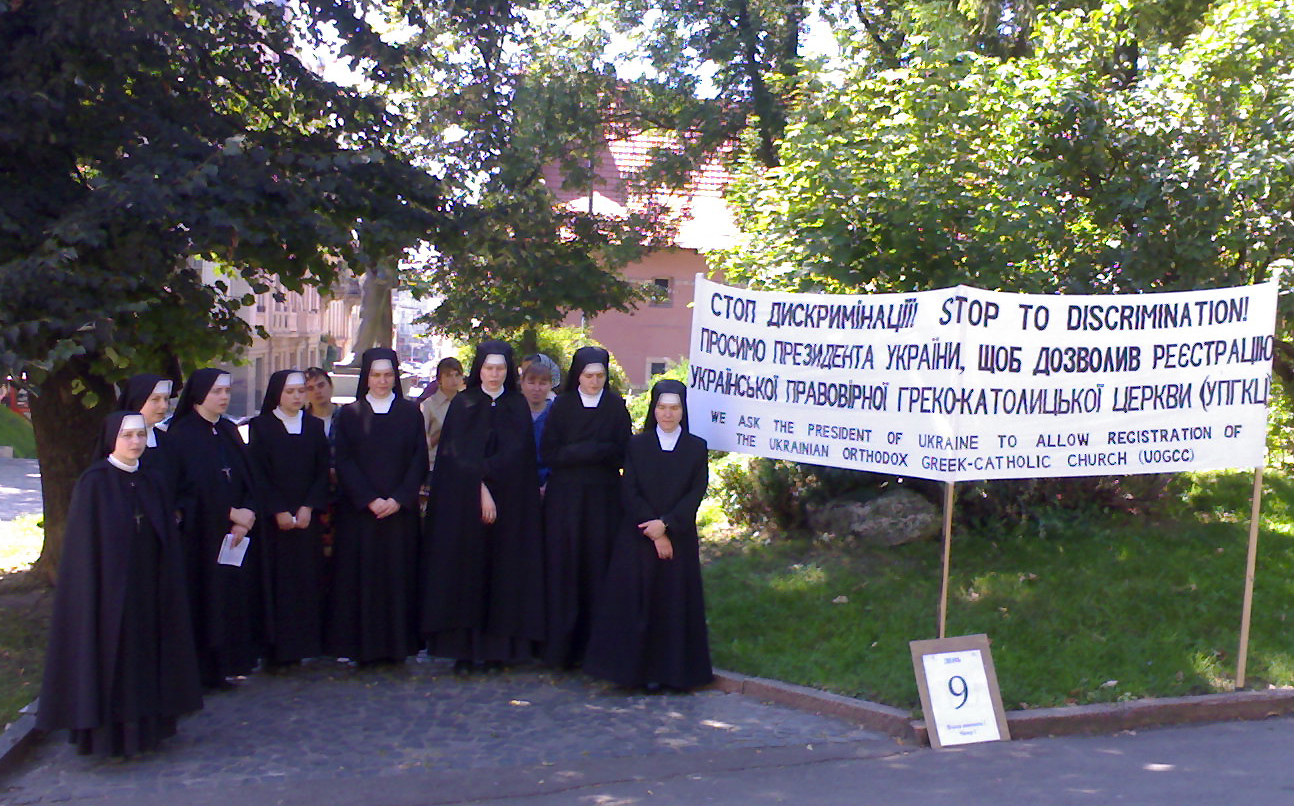
Nuns calling for formal registration of the UOGCC, August 2009

On March 3, 2008, A. Dohnal announced to Pope Benedict XVI that he and three other Basilian Fathers had been consecrated as bishops in order to save the Ukrainian Greek Catholic Church (UGCC) from heresy and apostasy. He did not identify the bishop or bishops who had performed the consecration. In justification for the act, he wrote that the bishops of the UGCC supported influences of syncretism and occultism, approval of homosexuality, and erroneous ecumenism. As an example of the latter, he cited the Balamand declaration of 1993, which had rejected "uniatism" as a method of seeking Christian unity between Catholics and Orthodox. In his letter, A. Dohnal denounced statements from Cardinal Husar's book "Conversations with Cardinal Lubomyr Husar: On post-confessional Christianity" as schismatic and apostate.

On Easter Sunday, March 23, 2008, the Ukrainian Greek Catholic Church released a statement from Cardinal Husar warning that any consecration that had taken place was not recognized by the Church.

In June 2008 the tribunal of the Eparchy of Sokal-Zhovkva held an ecclesiastical trial for the four priests. They were convicted of illegal assumption of authority and illegal administration of ministry (violation of can. 1462 of the Code of Canons of the Eastern Churches (CCEO)), inciting rebellion against the local hierarchy, including Bishop Mykhail Koltun, C.SS.R., Major Archbishop Lubomyr Cardinal Husar (violation of can. 1447 §1 CCEO), and causing injustice and serious harm to the good reputation of the above-mentioned persons and to other hierarchs of the UGCC through slander (violation of can. 1452 CCEO). The penalty imposed was major excommunication. After an appeal, the sentence was upheld by the tribunal of the major archeparchy and announced on September 17, 2008. This was done although the Pope did not declare excommunication.

On August 15, 2008, Pidhirtsi supporters were accused of an attempt to occupy a church administration building in Stryi, Ukraine. Taras Poshyvak, chancellor of the Stryi eparchy, said that the "regional leadership of the police" was interfering and preventing normal police protection of the building. UOGCC officials denied the accusation and complained of police harassment.

=== Founding of the UOGCC ===
On August 11, 2009, the bishops of the Pidhirtsi movement declared the founding of the Ukrainian Orthodox Greek Catholic Church as a "new Church structure for the orthodox faithful of the UGCC." In their declaration they professed the Catholic faith, including the primacy of the Roman Pontiff and disassociated themselves from "contemporary heresies which destroy both the Eastern and the Western Church."

On April 7, 2011, the UOGCC bishops declared the establishment of a Byzantine Catholic Patriarchate, offering to provide an episcopal authority to like-minded believers elsewhere in the world. Archbishop Elias Dohnal was selected as the first Patriarch of the new body. They declared on 1 May 2011 that both Pope John Paul II and Pope Benedict XVI were excommunicated and that the Holy See was vacant (Sedevacantism). They added: "The Byzantine Catholic Patriarchate is now commissioned by God to protect the orthodox doctrine of the Catholic Church, including the Latin Church. Only after an orthodox Catholic hierarchy and an orthodox successor to the Papacy is elected, will the Patriarchate be relieved of this God-given duty."

=== Conflict with the Catholic Church ===
On October 7, 2008, the Apostolic Signatura, the highest appeals court of the Catholic Church, including the UGCC from which the UOGCC separated, refused the appeal of the "Pidhirtsi fathers", and left the sentence of major excommunication imposed in June 2008 by the UGCC major-archiepiscopal tribunal intact.

In 2010, the UOGCC declared an excommunication upon 265 professors of the Pontifical Gregorian University, and declared that over 2200 bishops worldwide had excommunicated themselves by failing to "confess the faith and renounce contemporary heresies" by the deadline declared by the UOGCC. The declaration asserted that the bishops affected would thenceforth be unable to validly ordain priests. It also called for Pope Benedict XVI to purge the hierarchy, institute reforms, and resign. On May 1, 2011, the bishops of the UOGCC declared an excommunication against Pope Benedict XVI.

In November 2010, the Buchach eparchy of the UGCC reported a clash between parishioners and a group of about 70 Pidhirtsi supporters, including leaders Metoděj Richard Špiřík and Markian Vasyl Hitiuk, at the Church of the Transfiguration in Chortkiv in an apparent attempt to occupy the church. A statement by the UOGCC claimed that the church was its property.

On March 29, 2012, the Vatican Congregation for the Doctrine of the Faith (CDF) published a declaration, urged by the Ukrainian Greek Catholic Church and dated February 22, 2012, concerning the main bishops of the UOGCC. It stated that CDF would not recognize the episcopal consecrations of the UOGCC's bishops as valid, and that the bishops of the UOGCC had been excommunicated. The UOGCC bishops wrote a response to the excommunication.

=== Later developments ===
The group declared an anathema on then United States President Barack Obama, claiming that Obama has become "an instrument for the Antichrist" through his "active promotion of homosexuality, abortions and demoralization."

On 29 September 2019, Patriarch Elijah of the UOGCC issued "an anathema [...] on 26 cardinals, 134 bishops and 99 priests, participants in the [...] Amazon Synod"

On 14 October 2019, the UOGCC broke with their former policy of Sedevacantism and embraced Conclavism. They announced they had elected Archbishop Carlo Maria Viganò, the former Apostolic Nuncio to the United States, as their Pope.

In June 2020 the church's activities were banned by the City Council of Lviv.

== Controversies ==
=== Allegations of Russian collaboration ===
According to a 2014 New York Times article, Patriarch Elijah, a Czech national, had gone into hiding, to avoid expulsion from Ukraine for visa violations. The article also stated that the UOGCC had not attracted a large number of followers, but made headlines in the local Ukrainian news media for their pro-Russian views and alleged brainwashing of vulnerable young recruits.

The New York Times further claims that the Lviv-based Ekspres newspaper, reported that before the Fall of Communism, Elijah was a Soviet informer in the Czechoslovak Socialist Republic. In support of their claims, Ekspres published a document identifying Fr. Dohnal as a KGB mole with the code name “Tonek.” The UOGCC website denied the accusation.

=== Search for illegal immigrants ===
On 22 June 2015, the Security Service of Ukraine (SBU) service members in full "battle rattle" searched a convent in Bryukhovychi (near Lviv) as well as a chapel in the city of Lviv. They detained five members of the religious organization four citizens of Slovakia and one citizen of the Czech Republic. Two Slovaks had their documents expired after moving to Ukraine in 2013 and the State Migration Service of Ukraine main administration charged them with violation of migration regulations, fined them and approved forcefully deport them with banning to return for next three years. For one more Slovak citizen whose papers were in order a term of stay was shortened. All those three Robert (Samuil) Oberhauser, Peter (Basil) Kolodi, and Mariana Feledi left Ukraine same day on 22 June 2015. Two more one Slovak and another Czech played as not having identification papers on hand and were taken to a SBU investigation isolator in Lviv. Later, it was announced that they were moved out of the [Lviv] oblast to avoid any provocation as on 23 June 2015 about 100 people picketed the SBU administration in Lviv Oblast. Nonetheless, on 24 June 2015, those last two were found at the Zhovkva Raion courtroom where just before the session they finally showed their passports, Czech Richard (Metodij) Spirzik and Slovak Patrick (Timofij) Sojka. On decision of the court, both of them were deported from Ukraine the next day.

The SBU was not able to find the leader of the organization Elijah Anthony Dohnal. All detentions were conducted as part of criminal proceeding opened by the Shevchenkivskyi District department of the Ministry of Internal Affairs of Ukraine main administration against "Dohnalites". On 25 June 2015, the chief of SBU administration in Lviv Oblast commented that during the search in convent were noticed many other illegal immigrants who should be checked by migration authorities.

== Founders ==
Patriarch Elijah Anthony Dohnal (born 1946 in Hluk) was elected as first Patriarch of the Byzantine Catholic Patriarchate. He was elected by the Bishops’ Synod of the Ukrainian Orthodox Greek Catholic Church in an extraordinary assembly of 5 April 2011, on the day of establishment of the Byzantine Catholic Patriarchate.

Patriarch Elijah was ordained a priest in 1972 in the Czech Republic and joined the OSBM Order and changed rite in 1991. He has a doctorate in theology from Charles University, Prague and lectured dogmatics in Prešov, Slovakia.

He was ordained as an archbishop in 2009 and held the title of vicar. In 2011, he was elected and consecrated as Byzantine Catholic Patriarch by the Bishops' Synod, led by Archbishop Michael Osidach, on April 5.

Other bishops:

- Head of the Church: Mychajlo Osidach, Ukrainian: Osidach, a former Russian Orthodox priest, has claimed to have been consecrated as a Catholic bishop clandestinely in September 1989, during the era of Communist rule of Ukraine, by Archbishop Volodymyr Sterniuk (1907-1997) and Bishop Filemon Kurchaba (1913-1995). His consecration was never proofed and approved by the Holy See. As of 2014, he is not listed in the Annuario Pontificio as a bishop recognized by the Holy See.
- Secretary: Markian V. Hitiuk,: Ukrainian, born 1970
- Members of the Synod:
  - Metoděj R. Špiřík, : Czech, born 1968
  - Timotej Sojka,
  - Bazil Kolodi,
  - Samuel Robert Oberhauser, priest of the eparchy of Ivano-Frankivsk (Ukraine), Slovak, born 1969

== Beliefs and theology ==
The sect has been described as opposed to many of the political beliefs of the Ukrainian Greek Orthodox Church followers, including its opposition to Ukraine joining the European Union, and opposition to the overthrow of former and pro-Russian Ukrainian president Viktor Yanukovych. The UOGCC is fervently against homosexuality which it often accuses the government of Ukraine, the Ukrainian Greek Catholic Church, and the European Union, of spreading. Archbishop of Lviv Ihor Vozniak claims the UOGCC is funded by Russia to create disorder in the Ukrainian Greek Catholic Church.
