= Pidhirtsi Monastery =

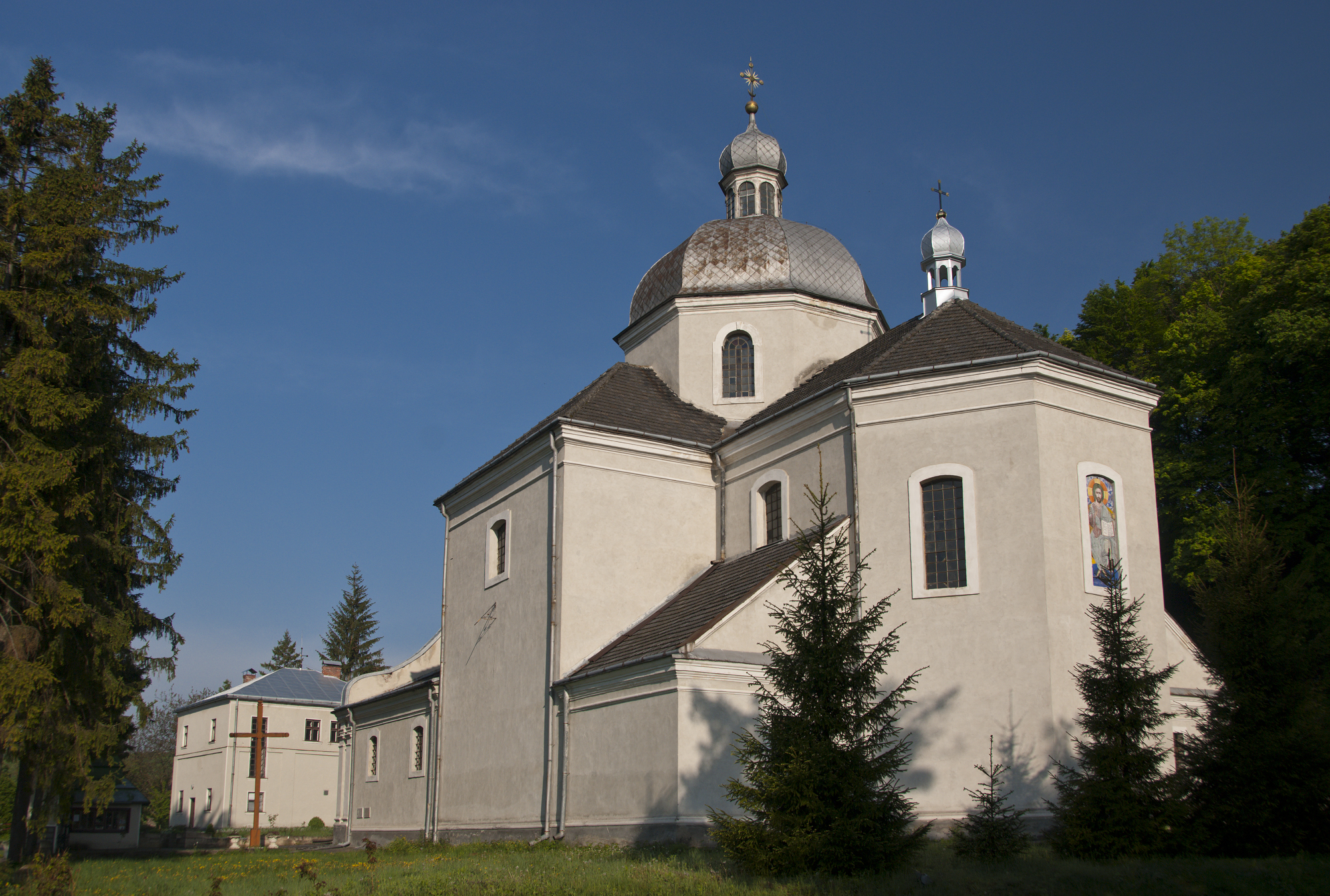
- Church of the Annunciation
- Pidhirtsi Monastery

Immovable Monument of National Significance of Ukraine
- Official name: Церква Благовіщення Пречистої Діви Марії та Келії василіанського монастиря (Church of the Annunciation of the Blessed Virgin Mary and the Cells of the Basilian Monastery)
- Type: Architecture
- Reference no.: 130088

The Pidhirtsi Annunciation Monastery (also known as the Plisnesk Annunciation Monastery; Ukrainian: Підгорецький благовіщенський монастир, Пліснеський благовіщенський монастир) is a male monastery of the Order of St. Basil the Great, located near the village of Pidhirtsi in the Zolochiv Raion of the Lviv Oblast, on the site of the historic Plisnesk. It was originally Orthodox, but later became part of the Ukrainian Greek Catholic Church.

== History ==
According to church legend, the monastery was founded in 1180 by Princess Olena Vsevolodivna, although documentary evidence of its existence only appears from the 17th century. The existence of the monastery in ancient Kievan Rus' times is confirmed by archaeological excavations, which revealed the remains of four temple buildings dating from different periods:

- In the Olenyn Park tract (12th–13th centuries)
- In the Seredhoroddia tract (13th–14th centuries)
- On the territory of the modern monastery cemetery (15th–17th centuries)
- Opposite the modern monastery bell tower (17th–18th centuries)

At the end of the 16th century, hermit monks began to settle near the ancient church. The official founding of the Orthodox monastery took place in 1659–1663.

In 1694, a miraculous icon of the Virgin Mary was brought to the monastery from the village of Holubytsia (now in the Zolochiv Raion), and it was crowned in 1754. In 1700, the monastery joined the Union together with the entire Lviv diocese, and after 1739, it joined the Ruthenian Congregation (province) of the Basilian Order.

Important historical documents have been preserved: the monastery chronicle (covering the years 1583–1729) and the monastery memorial book (started in 1710), to which the name of Taras Shevchenko was added in 1861.

In 1946, the monastery was closed by the Soviet authorities. Its buildings were used as a tuberculosis sanatorium. Church services continued in the temple until 1960. The monastery was revived in 1990–1991.

== Architecture ==
At the beginning of the 18th century, there were several wooden churches on the monastery grounds (Annunciation of the Blessed Virgin Mary, Beheading of John the Baptist, St. Onuphrius), as well as, presumably, the stone Church of the Transfiguration, which was dismantled in 1706.

After the fire of 1726, the stone church of St. Onuphrius was built between 1726 and 1750, which has survived to this day. This building is an example of Baroque basilica architecture, with three naves and one dome. The iconostasis, designed by architect Paweł Giżycki in 1754, is of particular artistic value. Adjacent to the church on the northwest side is a house of cells, built in 1771–1786 by architect Wenzlawski.

== Hegumens ==
Dominican Sadok Barącz, in his publication "Monaster OO. Bazylianów w Podhorcach" (1881), provides a list of hegumens of the Pidhirtsi Monastery up to 1875.

- Illia Hostyslavskyi (1662–1666; first abbot; arrived in Pidhirtsi from the Manyava Skete on 4 August 1661)
- Yiov (1667)
- Yoil Bachynskyi (renounced his abbotship due to illness)
- Vartolomei Vyshotravka
- Hedeon Hoshovskyi (later became abbot of Pochaiv)
- Atanasii Bereza (1676; suffered at the hands of the Turks along with the brethren)
- Sozont Lomikovskyi (soon renounced his abbotship)
- Isaia Buzkyi (1685)
- Sozont Lomykovskyi (elected abbot by the fathers, even though he had previously renounced this office)
- Partenii Lomykovskyi (1686–1729; accepted the Union, built the Pidhirtsi Monastery)
- Klymentii Slovitskyi
- Anastasii Zhlobinskyi (vicar)

...

- Sofronii Dobryanskyi (November 1739 – September 1745; first prior after the formation of the Ruthenian Province)
- Makarii Neronovych
- Yeronim Firlikovskyi
- Samuil Yurkevych (1751–1755)
- Atanasii Charkovskyi (1759)
- Yeronim Oziemkevych (1761–1764)
- Vihilii Shadurkyi (1764–1765)
- Salyustii Koblianskyi (from 1765)
- Donat Yevlashevych (1773–1776)
- Anatolii Vodzynskyi (1776; transferred to Pochayiv that same year)
- Vinkentii Zahorovskyi (1776–1778)
- Anatolii Vodzynskyi (1778–1781)
- Bonifatii Khomykovskyi (1781)
- Alimpii Anhelovych (1781–1784)
- Ihnatii Fylypovych (1784–1800)
- Yuliian Dobrylovskyi (1801–1803)
- Yosafat Zypovskyi
- Kasiian Didytskyi
- Apolinarii Zabaty
- Himnazii Dashkevych (1806–1818)
- Markiian Tarnavskyi (1818–1822)
- Himnazii Dashkevych (1822–1831)
- Sofronii Opuskyi (1831–1835)
- Dometii Fizio (1835–1842)
- Benedykt Olshanskyi (1842–1857)
- Lukiian Petrushevskyi (1857–1861)
- Klymentii Sarnytskyi (1861, temporary prior)
- Nykanor Kraievskyi (1861–1865)
- Klymentii Sarnytskyi (1865, temporary prior)
- Yuliian Telishevskyi (1865–1868)
- Yakiv Zahaiskyi (1868–1869)
- Matei Novodvorskyi (1869–1870, acting hegumen)
- Ivan Barusevych (1871–1872)
- Marko Lonkevych (1872–1874)
- Leontii Osmiliovskyi (1874–1881)
- Antonii Zahorovych (1882–1884)
- Yosafat Frankovskyi (1884–1886)
- Amvrosii Tarchanyn (1886–1888)
- Modest Lobodych (1888)
- Antonii Kuchynskyi (1889)
- Lonhyn Karpovych (1893–1900)

...

- Hryhorii Zalutskyi (1900–1903, first reformed hegumen)
- Sylvestr Kizyma (1903)
- Ambrozii Mushkevych (1903–1905)
- Hryhorii Zalutskyi (1905–1914)
- Vyniamyn Mutsykovskyi (1914–1919)
- Marian Povkh (1919–1920)
- Yuliian Datsii (1920–1932)
- Yakiv Vatsura (1932–1934)
- Dorotei Syroid (1934–1935)
- Veniamyn Rozhin (1935–1936)
- Yakiv Vatsura (1937–1942)
- Irynei Hotra-Doroshenko (1942–1943)
- Martyniian Lutsiv (1943–1947, last hegumen before the monastery was closed by the Soviet authorities)

...

- Pavlo Yakhymets (1990–1991, first prior of the restored monastery)
- Damian Kastran (1992–1995)
- Volodymyr Virsta
- Teodor Pyliavskyi
- Hryhorii Bardak
- Stepan Romanyk
- Roman Shelepko
- Nazarii Lekh (2004–2007)
- Viktor Batih (2007–2020)
- Yuliian Khomechko (from 2020)

== Gallery ==
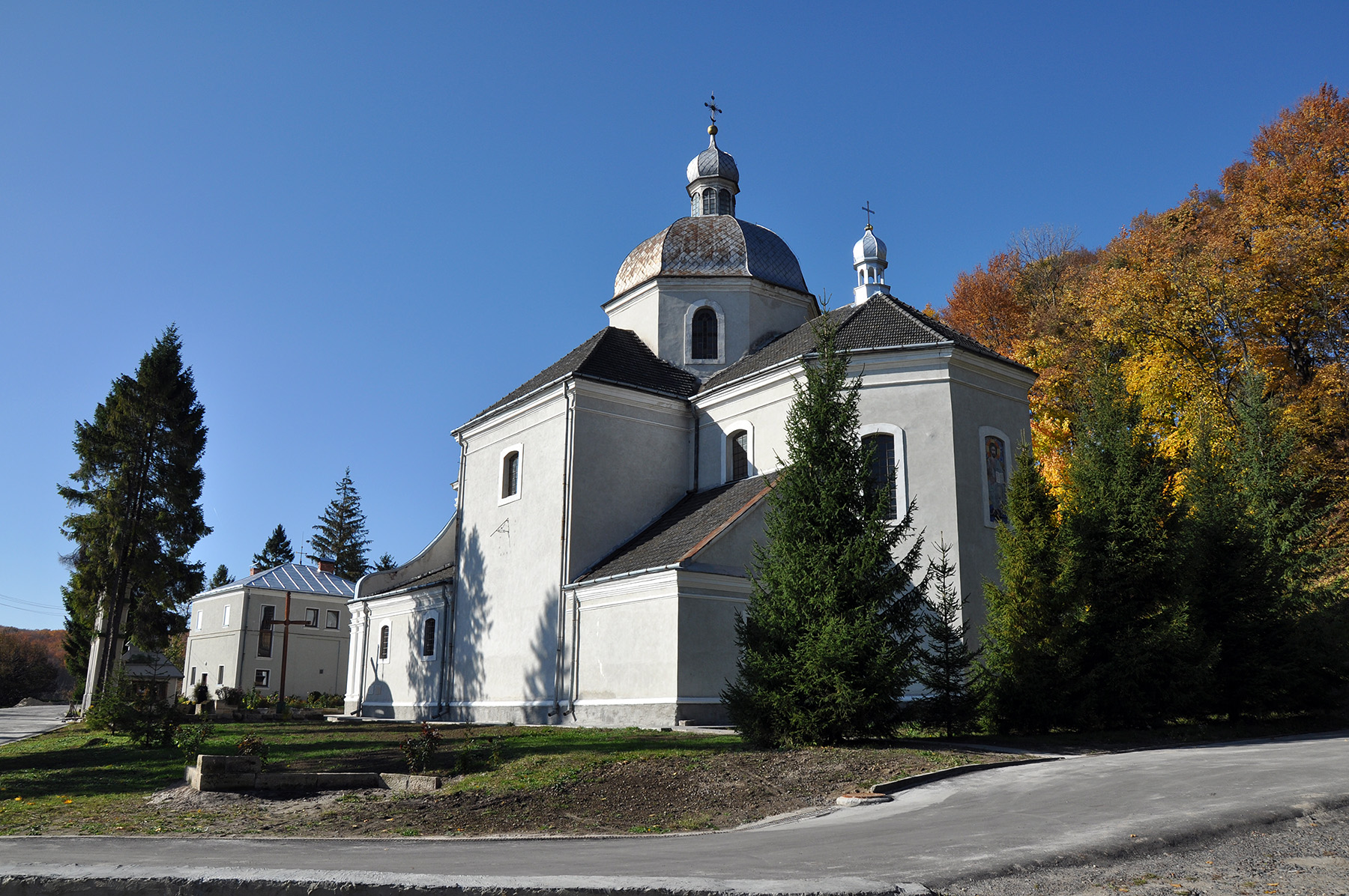
St. Onuphrius church of the Pidhirtsi Monastery

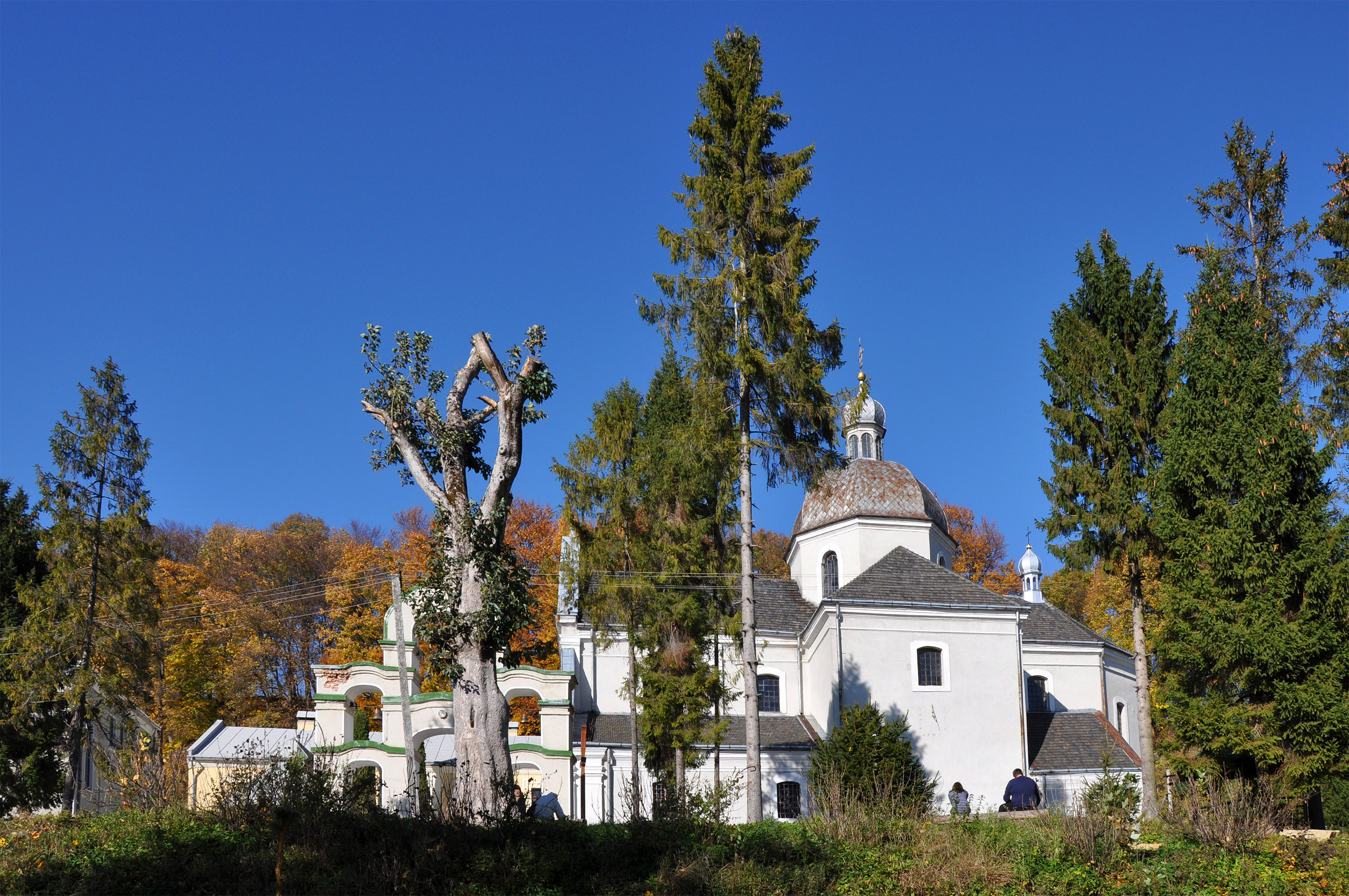
General view of the Pidhirtsi Monastery

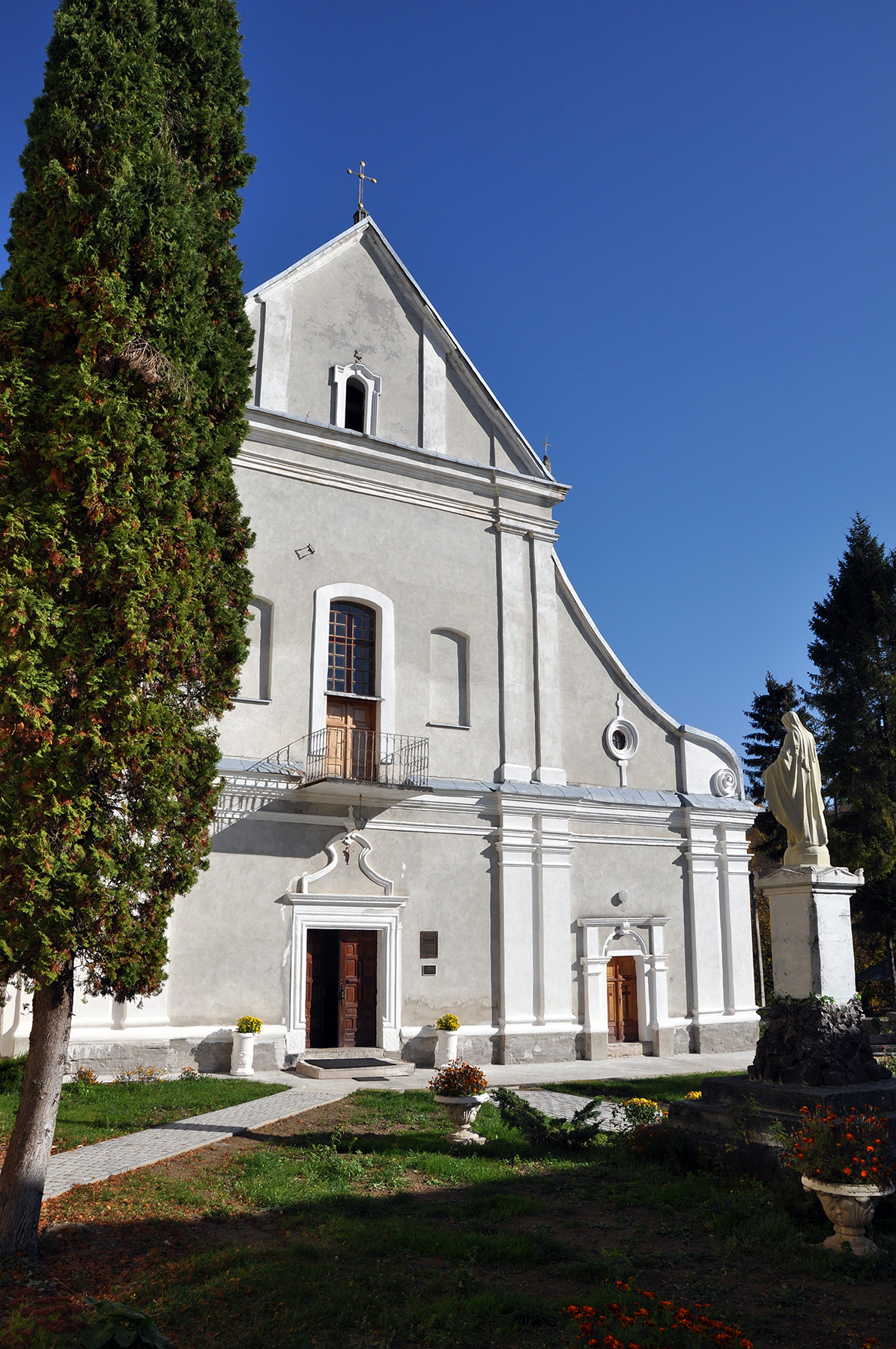
Facade of St. Onuphrius church

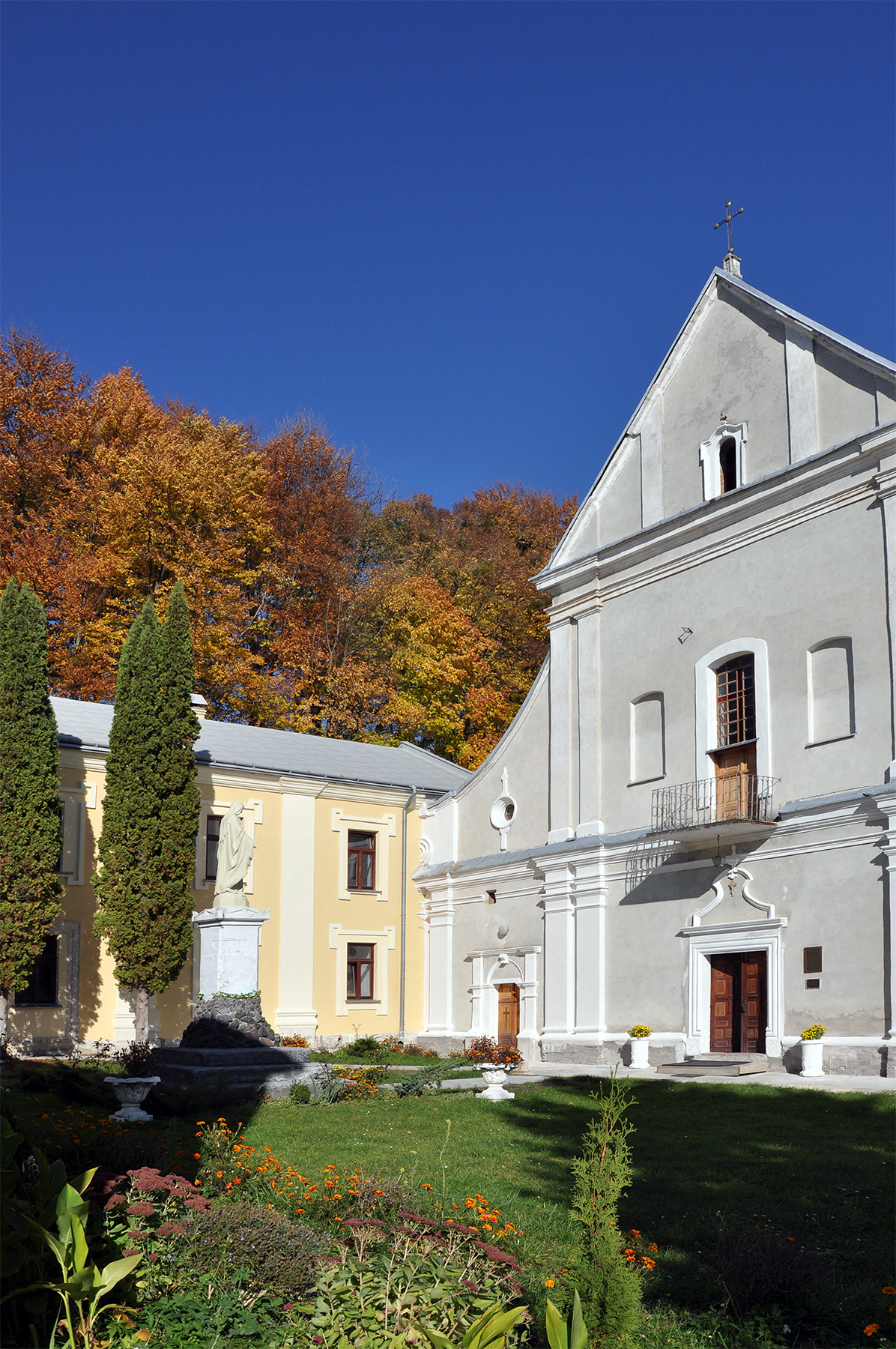
The St. Onuphrius church and adjoining cells

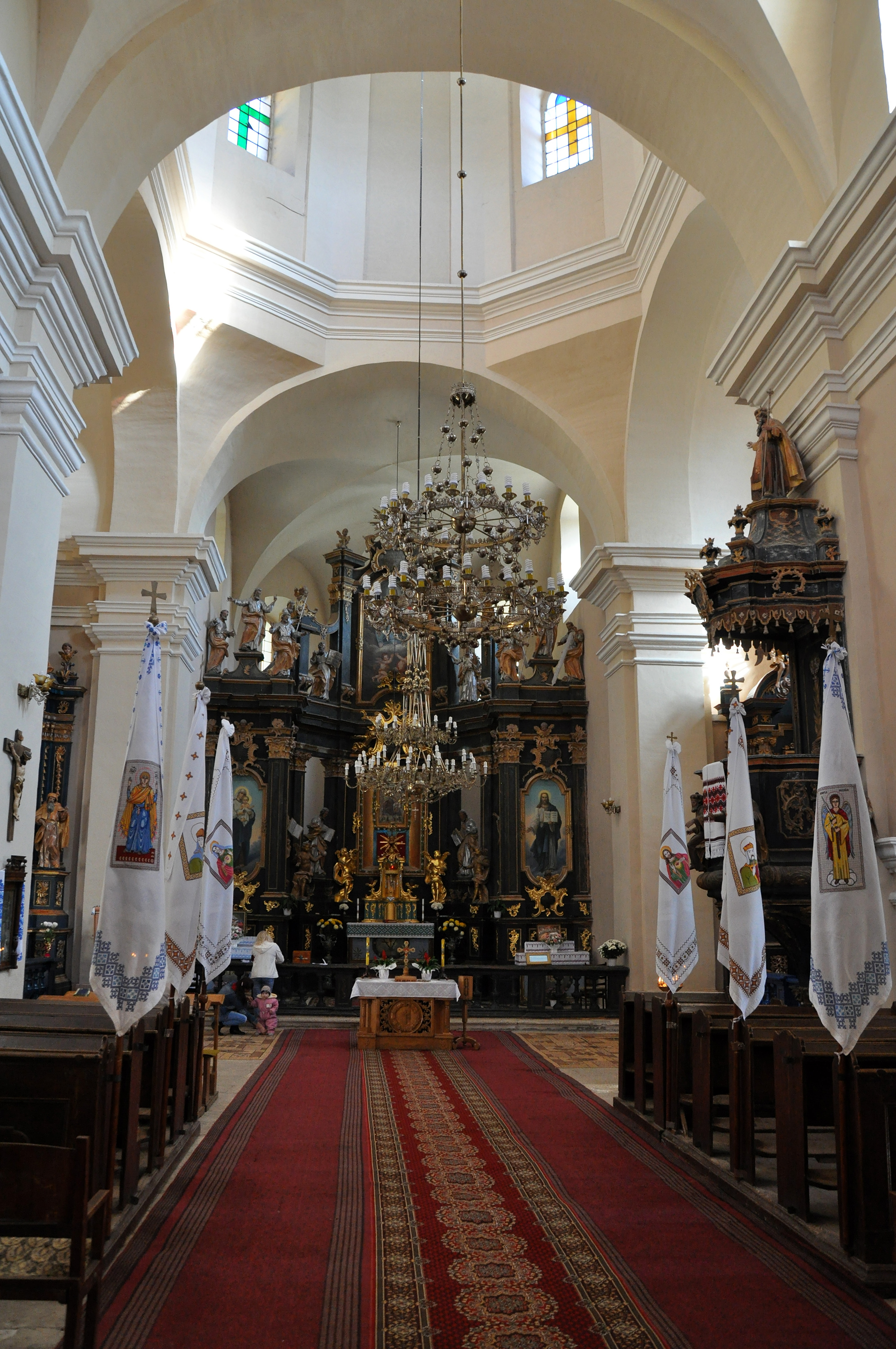
Interior of St. Onuphrius church
