= Andrii Fylypchuk =

Ukrainian archaeologist, historian, soldier (1989–2023)

- Андрій Филипчук
- Born: Andrii Mykhailovych Fylypchuk; 25 September 1989; Khyshevychi, Lviv Oblast, Ukrainian SSR, Soviet Union
- Died: 2 February 2023 (aged 33) near Kreminna, Luhansk Oblast
- Other name: Siryi (Сірий)
- Education: Ivan Franko National University of Lviv
- Occupations: Archaeologist, scientist, historian, soldier
- Awards: Order for Courage

Andrii Mykhailovych Fylypchuk (Ukrainian: Андрій Михайлович Филипчук; 25 September 1989 – 2 February 2023) was a Ukrainian archaeologist, scientist, historian, soldier of the 103rd Territorial Defense Brigade of the Armed Forces of Ukraine, and a participant in the Russian-Ukrainian war. Prior to his death, he was a member of the Ukrainian Archaeological Association and the NGO Pidhirtsi Sholom.

== Biography ==
Fylypchuk was born on 25 September 1989 in Khyshevychi, now the Velykolyubinska Hromada in the Lviv Raion of the Lviv Oblast of Ukraine. He is the son of fellow archaeologist Mykhailo Fylypchuk.

He graduated from the Department of History (2011, Master's Degree with honors, specializing in archeology) and postgraduate studies (2014, specializing in archeology) at Ivan Franko National University of Lviv.

He worked as a researcher at the Center for Monument Protection Research (2010–2011), and was assistant at the Department of Medieval History and Byzantine Studies (2015), as well as a researcher at the Research Department (2015, 2018–2019) at Ivan Franko National University of Lviv.

From 2015 onwards, he was the deputy director of research at the Ancient Plisnesk Historical and Cultural Reserve. He was also an archaeological tour guide in Lviv and Plisnesk.

He was head of the Plisnesk Archaeological Expedition of the Ancient Plisnesk Reserve (2016-2021). His topics of study included archaeology and early history of the Slavs and antiquities of the Plisnesk archaeological complex. He is an author of more than 100 scientific papers.

On 25 February 2022, he volunteered as a member of the Ukrainian military forces during the Russian invasion of Ukraine. He served in the 103rd Territorial Defense Brigade of the Armed Forces of Ukraine. He had the skills of a combat medic and a gunner of the SPG-9. He took part in hostilities in the territories of Luhansk and Donetsk Oblasts. He died on 2 February 2023 near the city of Kreminna, Luhansk Oblast.

He was buried on 10 February 2023 at the Lychakiv Military Cemetery, survived by a wife and son.

== Awards ==
- Order for Courage, 3rd class (8 November 2023, posthumously)

== Honoring the memory ==
In March 2023, a requiem tour was held in Lviv in honor of Andrii Fylypchuk.
