= Mykhailo Fylypchuk =

Ukrainian archaeologist (1955–2016)

- Михайло Филипчук
- Born: Mykhailo Andriiovych Fylypchuk; 19 December 1955; Potichok, Ivano-Frankivsk Oblast, Ukrainian SSR, Soviet Union
- Died: 31 July 2016 (aged 60); Khyshevychi, Lviv Oblast, Ukraine
- Education: Chernivtsi University
- Occupation: Archaeologist

Mykhailo Andriiovych Fylypchuk (Ukrainian: Михайло Андрійович Филипчук; 19 December 1955 – 31 July 2016) was a Ukrainian archaeologist, Candidate of Historical Sciences (1996), and Director of the Institute of Archaeology at Ivan Franko National University of Lviv.

He is noted for his groundbreaking archaeological research at Plisnesk. He is the father of Andrii Fylypchuk, who continued to research the site before his death as well.

== Biography ==
Fylypchuk was born on 19 December 1955 in Potichok, now the Sniatyn hromada of Kolomyia Raion, Ivano-Frankivsk Oblast, Ukraine.

In 1982 he graduated from the Department of History at Chernivtsi University. He is a student of Doctors of Historical Sciences Irina Rusanova and Borys Tymoshchuk.

From 1984 to 1986, he worked as a teacher at Vynohradiv Polytechnic and Vocational School No. 34; 1987–2000 – Researcher at the Department of Archeology of the Krypiakevych Institute of Ukrainian Studies of the National Academy of Sciences of Ukraine; 1996–1997 – Deputy Director for Research at the Research Center "Rescue Archaeological Service" of the Institute of Archeology of the National Academy of Sciences of Ukraine. Since 1999 – Associate Professor of the Department of Archaeology, Antiquity and Middle Ages at Lviv University. In 2000, he became the head of the Institute of Archeology at the Ivan Franko National University of Lviv.

From 1990 to 2016, he headed the Plisnesk Archaeological Expedition; he was one of the initiators of the creation and a leading researcher at the Administration of the Ancient Plisnesk Historical and Cultural Reserve. He participated in more than 40 archaeological expeditions in Chernivtsi, Ternopil, Ivano-Frankivsk, Lviv, and Zakarpattia Oblasts. He is the author of more than 80 articles and four monographs.

From 2000 to 2010, he was a member of the Academic Council of the Faculty of History at the Ivan Franko National University of Lviv. In 1991, he was an intern at the Institute for Prehistory and Early History at the University of Vienna.

His topics of study included: early Slavic issues: ethnogenesis of the Slavs; periodization and chronology of antiquities of the second half of the first millennium AD in the Ukrainian Carpathian region; system of settlement of the Ukrainian Carpathian region in the first millennium AD; state-building processes in the western Ukrainian region in the second half of the first millennium AD based on archaeological materials.

He died on 31 July 2016 in Khyshevychi, Horodok Raion, and he was buried on 2 July.
