= Potichok, Ivano-Frankivsk Oblast =

Rural locality in Ivano-Frankivsk Oblast, Ukraine

Potichok Потічок
- Location in Ivano-Frankivsk Oblast
- Coordinates: 48°28′54″N 25°33′16″E
- Country: Ukraine
- Oblast: Ivano-Frankivsk Oblast
- Raion: Kolomyia Raion
- Hromada: Sniatyn Hromada

Population
  - Total: 1,222
- Time zone: UTC+2 (EET)
  - Summer (DST): UTC+3 (EEST)
- Postal code: 78334

Potichok (Ukrainian: Потічок) is a village in Ukraine, Ivano-Frankivsk Oblast, Kolomyia Raion, Sniatyn urban hromada.

== History ==
The first written mention of the village dates back to 1469.

== Religion ==
The village has the Church of the Exaltation of the Holy Cross (1907, wooden, OCU).

== People ==
=== Born ===
- Mykhailo Fylypchuk (1955—2016), Ukrainian historian, archaeologist, researcher of Plisnesk

== Sources ==
- "Potoczek, pow. śniatyński". Geographical Dictionary of the Kingdom of Poland (in Polish). 8. Warszawa: Kasa im. Józefa Mianowskiego. 1887. p. 863.
