= Dubina (surname) =

Dubina or Dubyna (Cyrillic: Дубина) is a gender-neutral Slavic surname originating from the noun dubina, meaning a confident, powerful and stubborn person. It may refer to the following notable people:

- Joel Fredrick Dubina (born 1947), American attorney and jurist
- Julia Dubina (born 1984), Georgian triple jumper
- Martin Dubina, Slovak ice hockey player
- Oleh Dubyna (born 1959), Ukrainian businessman in the oil industry
- Vitali Dubina (born 1980), Russian-Ukrainian pair skater
