= Zabolottsi, Lviv Oblast =

Rural locality in Lviv Oblast, Ukraine

Zabolottsi
- Village
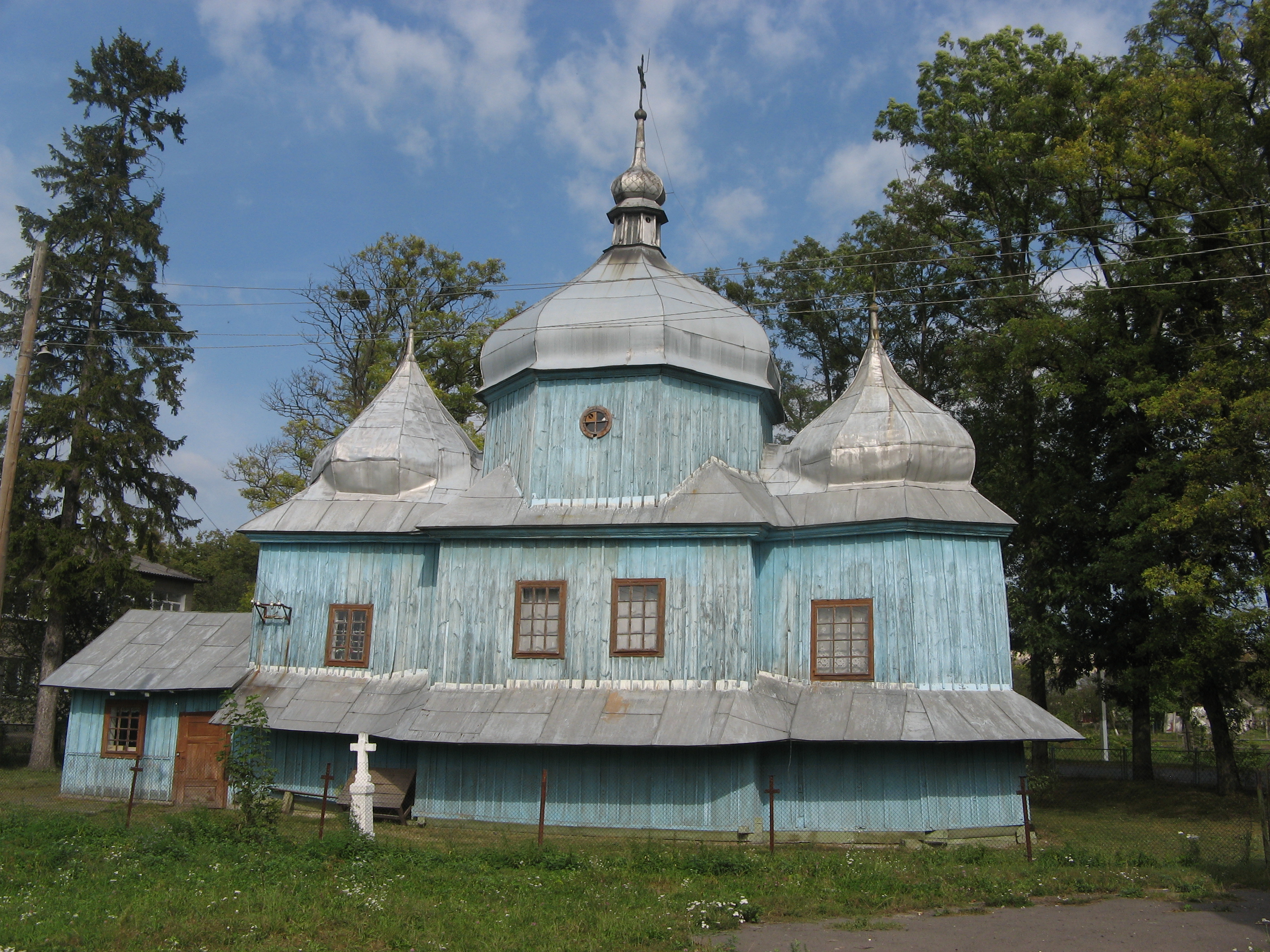
- The historic Wooden church of the Holy Mother of God showcases traditional Ukrainian sacral architecture, with its distinctive domes and weathered blue facade standing as a testament to the village’s cultural heritage.

- Location within Lviv Oblast Location within Ukraine
- Coordinates: 50.0306°N 24.9747°E
- Country: Ukraine
- Oblast: Lviv
- Raion: Zolochiv
- Area: 2.370 km^{2} (0.915 sq mi)
- Population: 948
  - Density: 400/km^{2} (1,000/sq mi)

Zabolottsi (Ukrainian: Заболотці) is a village (selo) in Zolochiv Raion, Lviv Oblast, in western Ukraine. It hosts the administration of Zabolottsi rural hromada, one of the hromadas of Ukraine.

Located near the source of Styr river, the village was established in 1494. From 1919 to 1939 it belonged to the Tarnopol Voivodeship of Poland.

Until 18 July 2020, Zabolottsi belonged to Brody Raion. The raion was abolished in July 2020 as part of the administrative reform of Ukraine, which reduced the number of raions of Lviv Oblast to seven. The area of Brody Raion was merged into Zolochiv Raion.
