= Zabolottsi rural hromada =

Hromada in Lviv Oblast, Ukraine

Zabolotsi rural hromada Заболотцівська сільська громада
- Hromada
- Interactive map of Zabolotsi rural hromada
- Country: Ukraine
- Oblast: Lviv Oblast
- Raion: Zolochiv Raion
- Admin. center: Zabolottsi

Area
  - Total: 2,353 km^{2} (908 sq mi)

Population (2021)
  - Total: 6,242
  - Density: 2.653/km^{2} (6.871/sq mi)
- Settlements: 15
- Villages: 15
- Website: zabolotcivska-gromada.gov.ua

Zabolotsi rural hromada (Ukrainian: Заболотцівська сільська громада) is a hromada in Ukraine, in Zolochiv Raion of Lviv Oblast. The administrative center is the village of Zabolottsi.

== Settlements ==
The hromada consists of 15 villages:

- Velyki Perelisky
- Velyn
- Vysotsko
- Vovkovatytsia
- Dubie
- Dubyna
- Zabolottsi
- Zahirtsi
- Luhove
- Luchkivtsi
- Mali Perelisky
- Mamchuri
- Novychyna
- Pidhirtsi
- Razhniv
- Ruda-Bridska
- Terebezhi
- Trishchuky
- Yaseniv
