= Luhove =

Rural locality in Lviv Oblast, Ukraine

Luhove Лугове
- Village
- Location within Ukraine
- Coordinates: 50°0′36″N 24°57′36″E
- Country: Ukraine
- Oblast: Lviv
- Raion: Zolochiv
- Area: 2.185 km^{2} (0.844 sq mi)
- Population: 642
  - Density: 321/km^{2} (830/sq mi)
- Postal code: 80631
- Area code: +380 3266

Luhove (Ukrainian: Лугове) is a village (selo) in Zolochiv Raion, Lviv Oblast, in western Ukraine. It belongs to Zabolottsi rural hromada, one of the hromadas of Ukraine.

From 1918 to 1939 the village was in Tarnopol Voivodeship in Poland.

Until 18 July 2020, Luhove belonged to Brody Raion. The raion was abolished in July 2020 as part of the administrative reform of Ukraine, which reduced the number of raions of Lviv Oblast to seven. The area of Brody Raion was merged into Zolochiv Raion.
