= Martin Dubina =

Slovak ice hockey player

- Born: 2 October 1987 (age 37); Bratislava, Czechoslovakia
- Height: 6 ft 0 in (183 cm)
- Weight: 176 lb (80 kg; 12 st 8 lb)
- Position: Center
- Shot: Right
- Slovak Extraliga team: HC Slovan Bratislava
- Playing career: 2003–2015

Martin Dubina (born October 2, 1987) is a Slovak professional ice hockey player who played with HC Slovan Bratislava in the Slovak Extraliga.
