= Plisnesk archaeological complex =

Ukrainian archaeological site

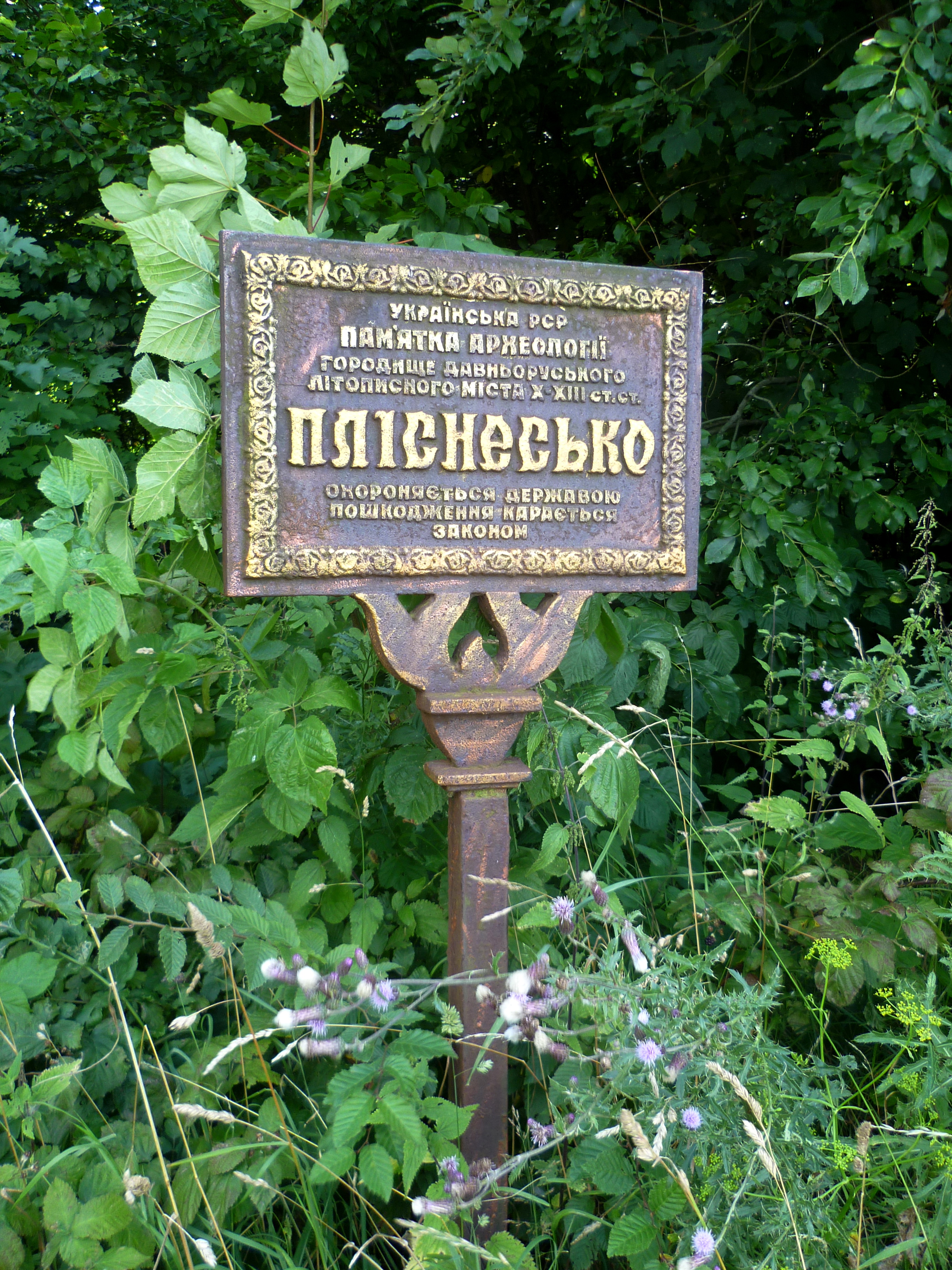
- A memorial plaque near the remains settlement of the 10th-13th century

Immovable Monument of National Significance of Ukraine
- Official name: Городище літописного міста Пліснеська (Hillfort of the legendary city of Plisnesk)
- Type: Archaeology
- Reference no.: 130011-Н

Plisnesk archaeological complex is a group of archaeological sites located near the khutir of Plisnesk (now part of Pidhirtsi, Zolochiv Raion, Lviv Oblast), at the source of the Buzhok river.

The early medieval settlement had a big area of 400-450 ha which could inhabit tens of thousands of people, surrounded by several rows of fortifications, smaller settlements, more than 142 burial mounds, and included a fort with a pagan center. Part of the Luka-Raikovetska culture, it was a Polis-like city and one of the centers of early medieval tribe of Croats. The city's downfall and layers of burning are considered to be related to the Vladimir the Great's war with the Croats (992–993).

Since 2015 is regionally protected as a Historic and Cultural Reserve "Ancient Plisnesk".

== Information ==
In 1810, the first studies of the complex were conducted by the Vasylian Father Varlaam Kompanevych and the local official Heisler. Subsequently, archaeologists Teodor Zemencki (1881–1883), Karol Hadaczek (1905, 1907), Yaroslav Pasternak (1940), Ivan Starchuk (1946–1949), Volodymyr Honcharov (1953), Mykhailo Kuchera (1954), Roman Bahrii (1970–1972, 1983), Mykola Peleshchyshyn, and Roman Chaika (1980) joined the study of Plisnesk. Mykhailo Fylypchuk (1990, 1993, 1998–2004, 2007–2016) and Andrii Fylypchuk (2015–2022) discovered dozens of dwellings, hundreds of Christian burials, Varangian mounds, structures of defensive structures, and a pagan cult site in the Olenyn Park tract.

Main attractions of the archaeological complex include:

- Ancient Slavic cult center of the late 7th–10th centuries
- Slavic site, attributed to the White Croats and White & Megali Croatia, of ancient fortified settlement 8th–10th centuries
- Old Kievan Rus' site of ancient settlement 11th–13th centuries (chronicle Plisnesk, first mentioned in writing in 1118 in the chronicle, and then in the "Tale of Igor's Campaign". It was part of the Galician principality and the Galicia-Volyn state. It was destroyed in 1241 as a result of the Mongol invasion, and now there is a khutir of the same name in its place. The territory of the settlement is an archaeological monument of national importance)
- Mound burial ground of the 9th–early 12th centuries (now an archaeological monument of national importance)
- Complex of buildings of the Pidhirtsi (Plisnesk) Monastery of the Order of St. Basil the Great

== Sources ==
- Fylypchuk, А. (2018). Давній Пліснеськ: історія та міфи [Ancient Plisnesk: History and Myths] (in Ukrainian). Lviv: Studia historia.
- Fylypchuk, A. (2015a). "Some aspects of interdisciplinary approaches to the study of antiquities of pre-Carpathian and Volyn region in the third quarter of the I millennium AD" (PDF). Proc. Inst. Archaeol. Lviv. Univ. (in Ukrainian). 10: 10–29.
- Fylypchuk, M. (2015b). "Plisnesko archaeological complex: theory and practice of studies" (PDF). Proc. Inst. Archaeol. Lviv. Univ. (in Ukrainian). 10: 38–64.
- Holovko, Oleksandr (2018). "Princely Halych: argumentative issues of the city's emergence and development as the capital of the Land, Principality". In Voloshchuk, Myroslav Mykhajlovych (ed.). Галич: збірник наукових праць (PDF) (in Ukrainian). Vol. 3. Ivano-Frankivsk: Лілея-НВ. pp. 82–103. ISBN 978-966-668-456-4.
- Hupalo, Vira (2014). Звенигородська земля у XI–XIII століттях (соціоісторична реконструкція) (in Ukrainian). Lviv: Krypiakevych Institute of Ukrainian Studies of the National Academy of Sciences of Ukraine. ISBN 978-966-02-7484-6.
- Mogytych, Ivan; Mogytych, Roman (2018). "Peculiarities of stone building techniques and architectural forms of the Galician, Volhynian architecture (10th–14st centuries)". In Voloshchuk, Myroslav Mykhajlovych (ed.). Галич: збірник наукових праць (PDF) (in Ukrainian). Vol. 3. Ivano-Frankivsk: Лілея-НВ. pp. 252–272. ISBN 978-966-668-456-4.
- Tomenchuk, Bohdan P. (2018). "Archeology of the preannalistic Halych as a cultural and religious center of the «Great White unbaptized Croatia» (to the question of the founding of Halych in the second half of the 10th century)". In Voloshchuk, Myroslav Mykhajlovych (ed.). Галич: збірник наукових праць (PDF) (in Ukrainian). Vol. 3. Ivano-Frankivsk: Лілея-НВ. pp. 10–42. ISBN 978-966-668-456-4.
- Timoshchuk, Boris Anisimovich (1995a). "Матеріали і дослідження з археології Прикарпаття і Волині". Materials and Studies on Archaeology of Sub-Carpathian and Volhynian Area (in Ukrainian). 6: 214–218.
- Timoshchuk, Boris Anisimovich (1995b). Восточные славяне: от общины к городам (in Russian). Московского Унив. ISBN 9785211032682.
- Timoshchuk, Boris Anisimovich (2015) [1999]. Восточные славяне в VII-X вв. – полюдье, язычество и начало государства [Eastern Slavs in the VII-X centuries – people, paganism and the beginning of the state] (in Ukrainian). Lviv: Видавництво Університету "Львівський Ставропігіон". ISBN 978-966-8067-43-10
- Voloshchuk, Myroslav (2021). "Galich, Was it a Real (part of) Rus'?". Konštantínove listy. 14 (2): 37–50. doi:10.17846/CL.2021.14.2.37-50. S2CID 244564524.
