= Sniatyn urban hromada =

Hromada in Ivano-Frankivsk Oblast, Ukraine

Sniatyn urban hromada Снятинська міська громада
- Hromada
- Interactive map of Sniatyn urban hromada
- Country: Ukraine
- Oblast: Ivano-Frankivsk Oblast
- Raion: Kolomyia Raion
- Admin. center: Sniatyn

Area
  - Total: 369.1 km^{2} (142.5 sq mi)

Population (2020)
  - Total: 41,376
  - Density: 112.1/km^{2} (290.3/sq mi)
- CATOTTG code: UA26080230000035462
- Settlements: 27
- Cities: 1
- Villages: 26
- Website: snyatyn-rada.gov.ua

Sniatyn urban hromada (Ukrainian: Снятинська міська громада) is a hromada in Ukraine, in Kolomyia Raion of Ivano-Frankivsk Oblast. The administrative center is the city of Sniatyn.

== Settlements ==
The hromada consists of 1 city (Sniatyn) and 26 villages:

- Beleluia
- Budyliv
- Vydyniv
- Vovchkivtsi
- Horishnie Zaluchchia
- Dzhuriv
- Dolishnie Zaluchchia
- Drahasymiv
- Zavallia
- Zadubrivtsi
- Zapruttia
- Kniazhe
- Krasnostavtsi
- Novoselytsia
- Orelets
- Pidvysoke
- Popelnyky
- Potichok
- Prutivka
- Rusiv
- Stetseva
- Stetsivka
- Tulova
- Tuchapy
- Ustia
- Khutir-Budyliv
