= 2011–12 Ukrainian First League =

Ukrainian First League
- Season: 2011–12
- Champions: Hoverla-Zakarpattia Uzhhorod
- Promoted: Hoverla-Zakarpattia; Metalurh Zaporizhia
- Relegated: ~~Nyva V.~~ (withdrew); ~~Enerhetyk~~ (withdrew); ~~Lviv~~ (withdrew)
- Matches: 292
- Goals: 761 (2.61 per match)
- Top goalscorer: 19 goals: Oleksandr Kosyrin (Odesa/Hoverla-Zakarpattia)
- Biggest home win: Hoverla-Zakarpattia 6–0 Odesa (Round 28)
- Biggest away win: Enerhetyk 0–4 Metalurh (Round 2); Naftovyk-Ukrnafta 0–4 Nyva (Round 18); Lviv 0–4 Olimpik (Round 19); Enerhetyk 1–5 Sevastopol (Round 22); Lviv 1–5 Metalurh (Round 28)
- Highest scoring: Naftovyk-Ukrnafta 3–4 Stal Alchevsk (Round 11); Krymteplitsia 4–3 Helios (Round 19); Metalurh 5–2 Arsenal (Round 23)
- Longest winning run: 13 – Sevastopol (Round 21–33)
- Longest unbeaten run: 14 – Sevastopol (Round 21–34)
- Longest losing run: 13 – Lviv (Round 10, 12–15, ppd. 11, 16–22)
- Highest attendance: 7,100 Mykolaiv – Dynamo-2 (Round 22)
- Lowest attendance: 150 Dynamo-2 – Arsenal (Round 3)

The 2011–12 Ukrainian First League was the 21st since its establishment. Eighteen teams competed in the competition. Two teams were promoted from the 2010–11 Ukrainian Second League. Two teams were relegated from the 2010–11 Ukrainian Premier League

The competition began on July 16, 2011 with seven matches. The competition had a winter break starting on November 22, 2011 and the competition resumed on March 24, 2012 and completed on May 30, 2012.

== Team changes ==
=== Promoted teams ===
These two teams were promoted from the 2010–11 Ukrainian Second League

Group A

- MFK Mykolaiv – Second League champion (returning after three seasons)

Group B

- Olimpik Donetsk – Second League champion (debut)

=== Relegated teams ===
Two teams were relegated from the 2010–11 Ukrainian Premier League

- FC Sevastopol – 15th place (returning after a season)
- Metalurh Zaporizhzhia – 16th place (debut)

=== Renamed teams ===
- Dnister Ovidiopol moved their operations to Odesa and renamed themselves to FC Odesa.
- Zakarpattia Uzhhorod was renamed to Hoverla-Zakarpattia Uzhhorod.

== Team locations ==
=== Map ===
The following displays the location of teams.

Location of teams in Ukrainian First League 2011–12

=== Stadiums ===
The following stadiums were used during the season.

Rank	Stadium	Capacity	Club	Notes
1	Ukraina Stadium	28,051	FC Lviv	Used as home ground in Round 28
2	Central Stadium, Vinnytsia	24,000	Nyva Vinnytsia	
3	Army Sports Club Stadium, Lviv	23,040	FC Lviv	Used as home ground in Round 21
4	Lobanovskyi Dynamo Stadium	16,873	Dynamo-2 Kyiv	Used as home ground in Round 23
5	Central Stadium, Mykolaiv	16,700	MFK Mykolaiv	
6	Zirka Stadium, Kirovohrad	13,667	Zirka Kirovohrad	
7	Labor Reserve, Bila Tserkva	13,500	Arsenal Bila Tserkva	
8	Avanhard Zakarpattya, Uzhhorod	12,000	Zakarpattya Uzhhorod	
9	Bukovyna Stadium, Chernivtsi	12,000	Bukovyna Chernivtsi	
10	Slavutych Arena	11,983	Metalurh Zaporizhzhia	
11	Stal Stadium, Alchevsk	8,632	Stal Alchevsk	
12	Kolos Stadium, Boryspil	5,654	Arsenal Bila Tserkva	Used by Arsenal as home ground after the winter break (Note: After the winter break Arsenal Bila Tserkva played their Round 22 fixture at Kolos Stadium in Boryspil due to not having a lease signed to use Trudovi Reservy.)
13	SK Sevastopol, Sevastopol, Crimea	5,511	FC Sevastopol	
14	Naftovyk Stadium, Okhtyrka	5,256	Naftovyk-Ukrnafta Okhtyrka	
15	Spartak Stadium, Odesa	4,610	FC Odesa	
16	Khimik Stadium, Krasnoperekopsk, Crimea	4,116	Tytan Armyansk	Used as home ground after the winter break (Note: After the winter break Tytan Armyansk played their home games at Khimik Stadium, Krasnoperekopsk, Crimea due to reseeding of the pitch at their stadium.)
17	Khimik Stadium, Armyansk, Crimea	3,450	Tytan Armyansk	
18	ST Sport Arena, Ahrarne, Crimea	3,250	Krymteplitsia Molodizhne	
19	Lofort Arena, Dobromyl	3,220	FC Lviv	
20	Enerhetyk Stadium, Burshtyn	3,000	Enerhetyk Burshtyn	
21	Helios Arena, Kharkiv	2,057	Helios Kharkiv	
22	Dukov Dnister Stadium, Ovidiopol	1,500	FC Odesa	Used as home ground in Round 23
23	Avanhard Stadium (artificial turf), Luhansk	1,000	Stal Alchevsk	Reserve ground - Used as home ground in Round 26
24	Dynamo Club Stadium, Chapayevka	750	Dynamo-2 Kyiv	
25	Sports Complex Olimpik, Donetsk	680	Olimpik Donetsk	

== Managers ==
Club	Coach	Replaced coach
Arsenal Bila Tserkva	(Ukraine) Ihor Artymovych	
Bukovyna Chernivtsi	(Ukraine) Vadym Zayats	
Dynamo-2 Kyiv	(Ukraine) Andriy Husin	
Enerhetyk Burshtyn	(Ukraine) Volodymyr Kovalyuk	(Ukraine) Mykola Vitovskiy (caretaker) (Ukraine) Bohdan Blavatskyi
Helios Kharkiv	(Ukraine) Volodymyr Shekhovtsov (caretaker)	
Hoverla-Zakarpattia Uzhhorod	(Ukraine) Oleksandr Sevidov	
Krymteplytsia Molodizhne	(Ukraine) Mykola Fedorko (caretaker)	
FC Lviv	(Ukraine) Volodymyr Zhuravchak	(Ukraine) Roman Marych (caretaker) (Ukraine) Roman Laba (caretaker)
Metalurh Zaporizhzhia	(Ukraine) Serhiy Zaytsev (caretaker)	
MFC Mykolaiv	(Ukraine) Ruslan Zabranskyi	
Naftovyk-Ukrnafta Okhtyrka	(Ukraine) Yevhen Yarovenko	(Ukraine) Vadym Kolesnyk (caretaker) (Ukraine) Serhiy Mizin
Nyva Vinnytsia	(Ukraine) Oleh Shumovytskyi (caretaker)	(Ukraine) Oleh Fedorchuk
FC Odesa	(Ukraine) Andriy Parkhomenko	
Olimpik Donetsk	(Ukraine) Ihor Petrov	
FC Sevastopol	(Ukraine) Serhiy Puchkov	(Ukraine) Oleksandr Ryabokon
Stal Alchevsk	(Ukraine) Anatoliy Volobuyev	
Tytan Armyansk	(Ukraine) Oleksandr Haydash	(Ukraine) Serhiy Kozlov (interim) (Ukraine) Mykola Fedorenko
Zirka Kirovohrad	(Ukraine) Vadym Yevtushenko	(Ukraine) Anatoliy Buznyk (Ukraine) Ihor Zhabchenko (Ukraine) Andriy Antonov (caretaker)

=== Managerial changes ===
Team	Outgoing head coach	Manner of departure	Date of vacancy	Table	Incoming head coach	Date of appointment
Metalurh Zaporizhzhia	(Ukraine) Hryhoriy Nehiryev (caretaker)	End as caretaker	1 June	Pre-season	(Ukraine) Serhiy Zaytsev (caretaker)	13 June
FC Sevastopol	(Bulgaria) Angel Chervenkov	Resigned	14 June	Pre-season	(Ukraine) Oleksandr Ryabokon	28 June
FC Lviv	(Ukraine) Oleksandr Ryabokon	Leaves for PFC Sevastopol	28 June	Pre-season	(Ukraine) Roman Laba (caretaker)	28 June
Zirka Kirovohrad	(Ukraine) Anatoliy Buznyk	Resigned	22 August	13th	(Ukraine) Ihor Zhabchenko	22 August
Enerhetyk Burshtyn	(Ukraine) Bohdan Blavatskyi	Resigned	16 September	18th	(Ukraine) Mykola Vitovskiy (caretaker)	17 September
FC Lviv	(Ukraine) Roman Laba (caretaker)	End as caretaker	24 September	16th	(Ukraine) Roman Marych (caretaker)	24 September
FC Sevastopol	(Ukraine) Oleksandr Ryabokon	Sacked	17 October	4th	(Ukraine) Serhiy Puchkov	18 October
Nyva Vinnytsia	(Ukraine) Oleh Fedorchuk	Resigned	20 October	17th	(Ukraine) Oleh Shumovytskyi (caretaker)	20 October
Naftovyk-Ukrnafta	(Ukraine) Serhiy Mizin	Resigned	5 November	9th	(Ukraine) Vadym Kolesnyk (caretaker)	7 November
Zirka Kirovohrad	(Ukraine) Ihor Zhabchenko	Sacked	9 November	15th	(Ukraine) Andriy Antonov (caretaker)	9 November
Naftovyk-Ukrnafta	(Ukraine) Vadym Kolesnyk (caretaker)	End as caretaker	30 November	8th	(Ukraine) Yevhen Yarovenko	30 November
Zirka Kirovohrad	(Ukraine) Andriy Antonov (caretaker)	End as caretaker	9 December	15th	(Ukraine) Vadym Yevtushenko	9 December
FC Lviv	(Ukraine) Roman Marych (caretaker)	End as caretaker	1 February	18th	(Ukraine) Volodymyr Zhuravchak	1 February
Enerhetyk Burshtyn	(Ukraine) Mykola Vitovskiy (caretaker)	End as caretaker	16 February	16th	(Ukraine) Volodymyr Kovalyuk	16 February
Tytan Armyansk	(Ukraine) Mykola Fedorenko	Resigned	16 May	13th	(Ukraine) Serhiy Kozlov (interim)	16 May
Tytan Armyansk	(Ukraine) Serhiy Kozlov (caretaker)	End as caretaker	23 May	13th	(Ukraine) Oleksandr Haydash	23 May

== League table ==
Pos	Team	Pld	W	D	L	GF	GA	GD	Pts	Promotion or relegation
1	Hoverla-Zakarpattia Uzhhorod (C, P)	34	27	3	4	67	16	+51	84	Promoted to Ukrainian Premier League
2	Metalurh Zaporizhzhia (P)	34	24	4	6	77	32	+45	76	Promoted to Ukrainian Premier League
3	FC Sevastopol	34	23	7	4	60	22	+38	76	
4	Arsenal Bila Tserkva	34	18	8	8	51	39	+12	62	
5	Krymteplitsia Molodizhne	34	17	9	8	50	38	+12	60	
6	Bukovyna Chernivtsi	34	15	12	7	38	29	+9	57	
7	Stal Alchevsk	34	14	8	12	51	50	+1	50	
8	Dynamo-2 Kyiv	34	15	5	14	39	39	0	50	
9	Helios Kharkiv	34	13	9	12	53	45	+8	48	
10	Naftovyk-Ukrnafta Okhtyrka	34	12	8	14	49	43	+6	44	
11	Zirka Kirovohrad	34	13	5	16	53	49	+4	44	
12	Olimpik Donetsk	34	11	7	16	38	44	−6	40	
13	Nyva Vinnytsia (D)	34	7	11	16	21	39	−18	32	Withdrew (Note: Nyva Vinnystia withdrew from the PFL after the season.(13 July 2012))
14	Tytan Armyansk	34	9	5	20	33	59	−26	32	
15	FC Odesa	34	7	10	17	37	51	−14	31	
16	MFK Mykolaiv (Note: MFK Mykolaiv were deducted 3 points for failure of payments of financial obligations ordered by the PFL. (31 May 2012)) (O)	34	9	4	21	33	51	−18	28	Qualification for relegation play-off
17	Enerhetyk Burshtyn (D)	34	5	4	25	26	72	−46	19	Withdrew (Note: Enerhetyk Burshtyn withdrew from the PFL after Round 32.)
18	FC Lviv (Note: FC Lviv were deducted 3 points for failure of payments of financial obligations ordered by the PFL. (31 May 2012)) (D)	34	6	3	25	21	79	−58	18	Withdrew (Note: FC Lviv withdrew from the PFL after the season.(12 July 2012))

Source: Professional Football League of Ukraine
Rules for classification: 1st points; 2nd goal difference; 3rd goals scored; 4th fair play
(C) Champions; (D) Disqualified; (O) Play-off winners; (P) Promoted

=== Withdrawn Teams ===
==== Enerhetyk Burshtyn ====
On 22 May the president of Enerhetyk Burshtyn informed that the Round 32 match in Vinnytsia was the last match as a professional club and that the will not be competing in the last two games of the season. The rest of Enerhetyk's fixtures (2 games) are considered technical losses. The club played 32 games in the League and had a record of 5 wins, 4 draws and 23 losses with 26 goals scored and 72 against.

==== FC Lviv ====
Prior to the start of the 2012–13 Ukrainian Second League season the Sporting Director of the club informed the PFL that they are withdrawing from the league due to termination of their financial sponsor.

==== Nyva Vinnytsia ====
The club originally informed the PFL that they were to withdraw from the league when the draw for the 2012–13 season was made due to insufficient funds.(5 July 2012) However, the city and the oblast administration informed the PFL guaranteeing sufficient funds for the next season.(10 July 2012) The club was to participate in the 2012–13 Ukrainian Second League competition after readmission to the PFL but was dissolved not submitting proper documentation or license fees and was omitted from the competition.(13 July 2012)

=== Promotion/relegation playoff ===
The playoff consisted of the match played between the 16th place team of the First League and the winner of another playoff game between the second placed clubs from each group of the 2011–12 Ukrainian Second League. For the matchup qualified MFC Mykolaiv (First League) and Avanhard Kramatorsk (Second League).

Team 1	Score	Team 2
MFC Mykolaiv	4–3	Avanhard Kramatorsk

3 June 2012
17:00 EEST

MFK Mykolaiv	4 – 3	Avanhard Kramatorsk
Hudzikevych 40' (pen.); Lysytsyn 71'; Berko 78'; Lischuk 84'		Chuchman 11' (o.g.); Shvydkyi 59'; Lukyanets 90'

Podillya Stadium, Khmelnytskyi
Referee: Oleksandr Plaviuk (Kyiv)

MFK Mykolaiv remained in the First League. Avanhard Kramatorsk promoted to First League after Nyva Vinnystia withdrew from PFL (5 July 2012)

==== Playoff bracket ====
Second League playoff			Promotion/relegation playoff
			1L	MFC Mykolaiv	4
2L	Desna Chernihiv	0	2L	Avanhard Kramatorsk	3
2L	Avanhard Kramatorsk	1

- 1L – First League
- 2L – Second League

== Results ==
As of May 30, 2012

Home \ Away	ABT	BUK	DK2	ENE	HEL	HOV	KRM	LVI	NAF	NYV	MZA	MYK	ODS	OLD	SEV	STA	TYA	ZIR
Arsenal Bila Tserkva		1–0	1–0	1–2	1–1	0–0	0–0	2–0	0–2	2–0	2–1	5–0	0–0	1–0	0–1	3–2	2–1	2–1
Bukovyna Chernivtsi	0–0		2–1	2–0 (Note: Two Round 3 fixtures were postponed for a day due to the mining disaster at the Suhodolskaya-Vostochnaya coal mine when a day of mourning was announced by the President of Ukraine. (30 July 2011))	1–1	2–2	0–1	0–0	0–0	1–1	3–2	1–0	1–0	1–0	1–1	1–0	3–1	3–2
Dynamo-2 Kyiv	0–2	3–0		3–1	2–1	0–2	0–2	5–0	1–0	0–0	1–0	1–0	0–0	2–1	2–3	1–3	2–0	2–2
Enerhetyk Burshtyn	2–3	0–0	-:+ (Note: Round 33 match was not played. Enerhetyk Burshtyn's management informed the PFL that they would withdraw the club from the competition. (24 May 2012))		0–3	1–3	0–2	1–0	0–2	0–0	0–4	1–2	0–1	3–2	1–5	3–0	0–2	1–0
Helios Kharkiv	2–2	0–2	1–2	3–0		2–3	2–2	2–0	0–0	2–1	0–1	4–2		2–1	3–2	4–0	2–1	3–2
Hoverla Uzhhorod	5–0	2–0	1–0	2–1	2–0		4–0	4–0	1–0	2–0	1–0	3–0	6–0	4–1	1–0	1–0	3–1	2–0
Krymteplytsia Molodizhne	1–2	0–1	0–0	2–2	4–3	1–0		2–1	3–2	2–0	0–0	2–1	4–0	3–0	0–2	4–1	2–1	2–0
FC Lviv	1–4	1–2	0–1	+:-	1–3	1–0	1–0		0–2	1–1	1–5	2–1	1–4	0–4	0–2	2–3	1–3	1–0
Naftovyk-Ukrnafta Okhtyrka	1–2	1–1	3–0	3–0 (Note: Round 28 match was not played. Enerhetyk Burshtyn's management informed the PFL that they would not travel to Okhtyrka due to their financial state. (27 April 2012) The PFL Disciplinary committee awards a 3–0 technical victory to Naftovyk-Ukrnafta Okhtyrka. (May 17, 2012))	1–2	0–2	1–1	2–1		0–4	1–1	3–0	3–1	0–1	3–1	3–4	1–1	5–1
Nyva Vinnytsia	0–2	0–2	1–2	4–1	1–0	0–1	0–0	1–1	0–1		1–4	0–1	0–0	1–0	0–0	0–3 (Note: Round 16 match was not played. Stal' players and fans arrived to the ground with police and safety workers on hand at the ground. Five minutes prior to the game an announcement was made that due to Nyva Vinnytsia's financial situation the match would not take place. The PFL Disciplinary committee awards a 0–3 technical victory to Stal' Alchevsk. (October 27, 2011))	0–1	1–1
Metalurh Zaporizhzhia	5–2	3–2	2–1	4–0	4–2	1–1	4–0	4–0 (Note: Originally this fixture was scheduled in Round 11 but was postponed due to FC Lviv's financial difficulties. Match was played on 13 October 2011 after Round 15.)	2–1	1–0		1–0	3–0	3–2	1–0	3–0	5–1	4–1
MFC Mykolaiv	1–2	1–2	1–2	2–0	2–0	0–1	3–2	3–0	2–0	0–1	1–2		0–0	1–2	0–1	1–2	2–0	3–1
FC Odesa	1–0	1–1	4–0	2–2	1–3	0–1	1–1	2–3	1–1	0–1	0–1	3–0		1–1	1–3	1–2	5–2	1–3
Olimpik Donetsk	2–2	0–1	1–0	3–2	1–1	0–1	1–0	4–0	2–1	0–0	1–2	0–0	1–0		1–4	1–0	3–0	1–1
Sevastopol	1–1	0–0	1–0	2–1	1–0	2–1	1–1	4–0	3–1	5–1	2–1	3–0	1–0	0–0		2–1	2–0	2–0
Stal Alchevsk	3–2	2–2	0–2	3–0	0–0	3–2	2–3 (Note: Round 22 was rescheduled to 24 April 2012 due to the state of Stal's Alchevsk home stadium.)	2–0	3–0	0–0	1–1	2–2	2–1	2–0	0–0		2–2	1–1
Tytan Armyansk	0–2	1–0	1–1	3–0	0–0	0–2	1–2	2–0	1–4	0–1	0–2	0–0	1–0	3–1	0–2	2–1		0–2
Zirka Kirovohrad	3–0	1–0	3–2	4–1	2–1	0–1	0–1	4–1	1–1	3–0	4–0	2–1	2–3	2–0	0–1	0–1	4–1	

Updated to match(es) played on May 30, 2012. Source: PFL Persha Liha Calendar
Legend: Blue = home team win; Yellow = draw; Red = away team win.

== Top scorers ==
As of May 30, 2012

	Scorer	Goals (Pen.)	Team
1	(Ukraine) Oleksandr Kosyrin (Note: FC Odesa did not renew its contract with Oleksandr Kosyrin during the winter break. Hoverla-Zakarpattia signed Kosyrin to a multi year deal. (17 January 2012))	19	FC Odesa/Hoverla-Zakarpattia Uzhhorod
2	(Ukraine) Serhiy Kuznetsov	16 (1)	FC Sevastopol
3	(Ukraine) Oleksandr Kochura	14 (1)	Zirka Kirovohrad
4	(Ukraine) Viktor Raskov	13	Helios Kharkiv
4	(Ukraine) Oleksiy Byelik	13 (2)	Metalurh Zaporizhzhia
6	(Ukraine) Ivan Matyazh (Note: Ivan Matyazh during the winter break signed a contract with Metalurh Zaporizhzhia. (24 February 2012))	12 (1)	Olimpik Donetsk/Metalurh Zaporizhzhia
6	(Ukraine) Artur Karnoza	12 (5)	Naftovyk-Ukrnafta Okhtyrka
8	(Ukraine) Yevhen Pisotskyi	10	Metalurh Zaporizhia
8	(Georgia (country)) Lasha Jakobia	10 (1)	Hoverla-Zakarpattia Uzhhorod
8	(Ukraine) Ruslan Hunchak	10 (3)	Bukovyna Chernivtsi
8	(Ukraine) Valentyn Poltavets	10 (3)	FC Odesa

== See also ==
- 2011–12 Ukrainian Second League
- 2011–12 Ukrainian Premier League
