= Pustomyty Raion =

Former subdivision of Lviv Oblast, Ukraine

Pustomyty Raion Пустомитівський район
- Raion
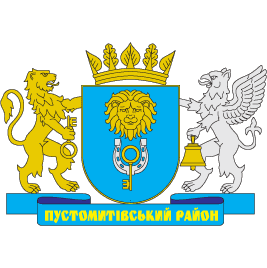
- Flag Coat of arms

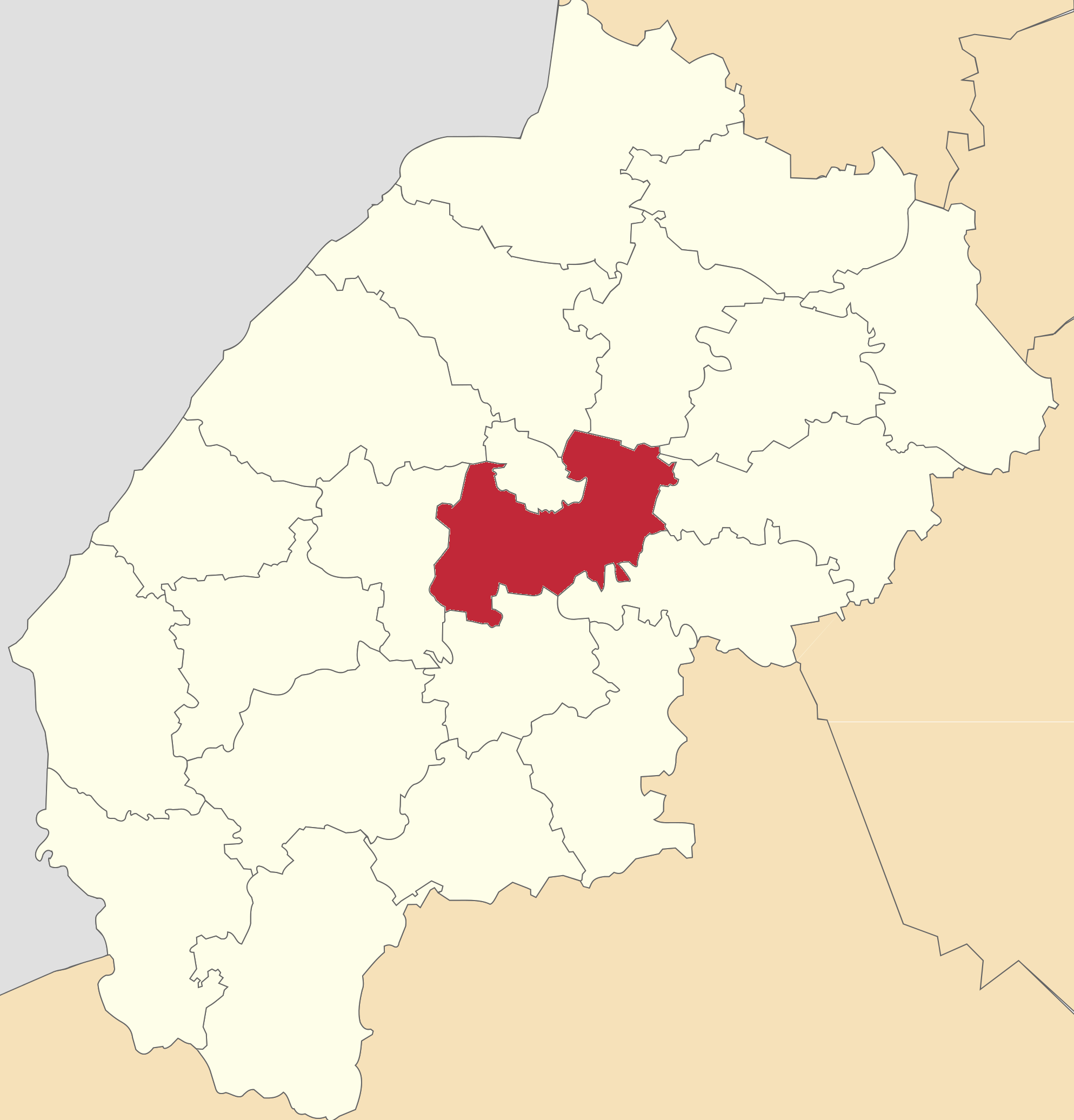
- Coordinates: 49°44′35″N 24°4′37″E
- Country: Ukraine
- Region: Lviv Oblast
- Established: 1959
- Disestablished: 18 July 2020
- Admin. center: Pustomyty
- Subdivisions: List: — city councils; — settlement councils; — rural councils; Number of localities: — cities; — urban-type settlements; 102 — villages; — rural settlements

Area
  - Total: 953 km^{2} (368 sq mi)

Population (2020)
  - Total: 120,872
  - Density: 127/km^{2} (328/sq mi)
- Time zone: UTC+02:00 (EET)
  - Summer (DST): UTC+03:00 (EEST)
- Postal index: 81100—81176
- Area code: 380-3230
- Website: http://www.pustomyty.gov.ua/ Pustomytivskyi Raion

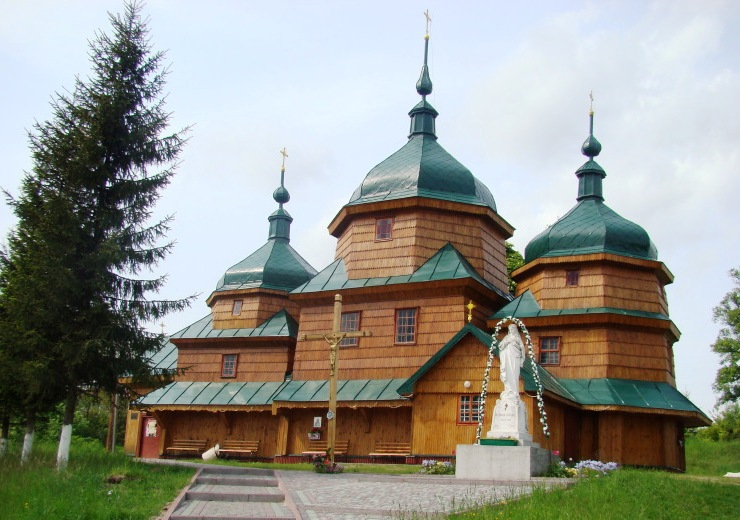
The Saint Mary wooden church in the village of Pykulovychi

Pustomyty Raion (Ukrainian: Пустомитівський район) was a raion (district) in Lviv Oblast in western Ukraine. Its administrative center was the city of Pustomyty. The raion was abolished on 18 July 2020 as part of the administrative reform of Ukraine, which reduced the number of raions of Lviv Oblast to seven. The area of Pustomyty Raion was merged into Lviv Raion. The last estimate of the raion population was 120,872 (2020 est.).

It was established in 1959.

At the time of disestablishment, the raion consisted of nine hromadas:

- Davydiv rural hromada with the administration in the selo of Davydiv;
- Murovane rural hromada with the administration in the selo of Murovane;
- Obroshyne rural hromada with the administration in the selo of Obroshyne;
- Pidberiztsi rural hromada with the administration in the selo of Pidberiztsi;
- Pustomyty urban hromada with the administration in Pustomyty;
- Shchyrets settlement hromada with the administration in the urban-type settlement of Shchyrets;
- Sokilnyky rural hromada with the administration in the selo of Sokilnyky;
- Solonka rural hromada with the administration in the selo of Solonka;
- Zymna Voda rural hromada with the administration in the selo of Zymna Voda.

== See also ==
- Administrative divisions of Lviv Oblast
