= Navariia =

Navariia Наварія
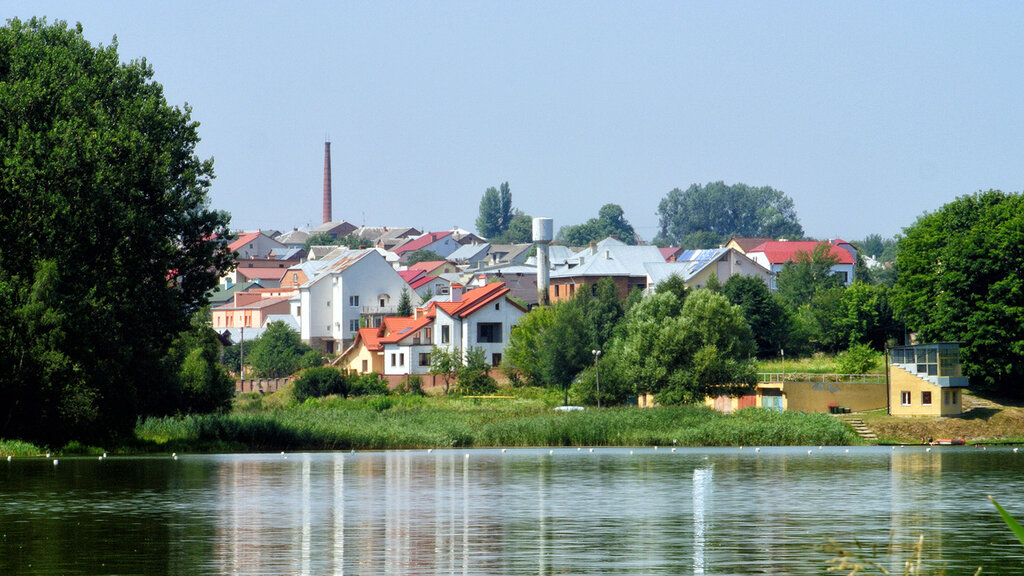

- Coat of arms

- Location in Ukraine Navariia (Ukraine)
- Country: Ukraine
- Oblast: Lviv Oblast
- Raion: Lviv Raion

Area
  - Total: 209 km^{2} (81 sq mi)

Population
  - Total: 1,493

Navariia (Ukrainian: Наварія) is a village located in Lviv Raion, Lviv Oblast, Ukraine. Navaria belongs to Pustomyty urban hromada, one of the hromadas of Ukraine. The population is 1,493 people.

== History ==
Navariia was a town in Ruthenian Voivodaship at the edge of the 16th to 18th centuries.

In 1578 received Magdeburg rights from king Stefan Bathory with trade privileges, which had a huge influence in town's development.

At the end of the 16th century appeared first coat of arms of Navariia — wall of the castle with gateway and 3 wall towers.

After the Second Partition of Poland Austrian government declared Navariia as town of Lviv district.

Gmina Navariia was established in 1 September 1934 in Lviv powiat. It contained rural gminas of: Basivka, Pustomyty, Hodovitsia, Lisnevyschi and Glinna (now parts of Pustomyty), Malechkovychi, Miloshevychi, Mistky, Nahoriany, Pidsadky, Polianka, Porshna and Semenivka. Total area of gmina was 144.61 km^{2} (55.83 sq mi), with a population over 15,000 people.
