= Konopnytsia =

Rural locality in Lviv Oblast, Ukraine

Konopnytsia Коно́пниця
- Village
- Location within Lviv Oblast
- Coordinates: 49°49′00″N 23°51′27″E
- Country: Ukraine
- Oblast: Lviv Oblast
- District: Lviv Raion
- Established: 1370

Area
  - Total: 167 km^{2} (64 sq mi)
- Elevation /(average value of): 319 m (1,047 ft)

Population
  - Total: 562
  - Density: 33,653/km^{2} (87,160/sq mi)
- Time zone: UTC+2 (EET)
  - Summer (DST): UTC+3 (EEST)
- Postal code: 81111
- Area code: +380 3230
- Website: село Конопниця ^{(Ukrainian)}

Konopnytsia (old Name – Sopilka (Fuyarivka), Ukrainian: Коно́пниця, Сопілка (Фуярівка)) is a village (selo) in Lviv Raion, Lviv Oblast of Western Ukraine. It belongs to Obroshyne rural hromada, one of the hromadas of Ukraine. Local government is administered by Konopnytska village council.

== Geography ==
Area of the village totals is 1,67 km^{2} and is located along the Highway in Ukraine M 11 connecting Lviv with Przemyśl. Distance from the regional center Lviv is 14 kilometres (8.7 mi) , 18 kilometres (11 mi) from the district center Pustomyty, and 84 kilometres (52 mi) from Przemyśl.

== History ==
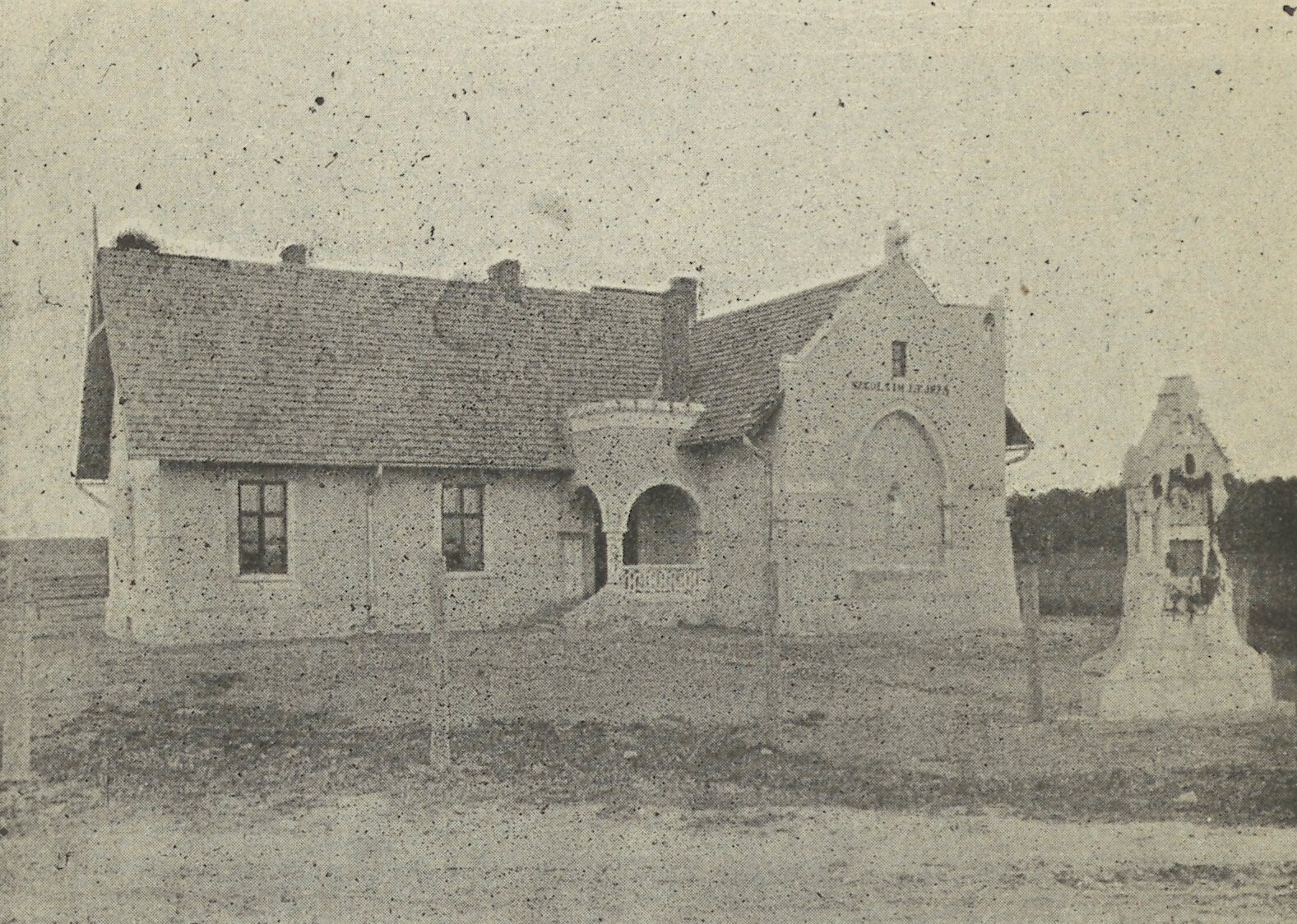
Schoole, before 1911

The first written mention of the village Sopilka dates back to 1370 year. But in Polish documents 16th - 19th centuries been writing name Fuyarivka.

But the village Konopnytsia was really built up in the early twentieth century, when it was populated by immigrants from Western Poland. The Polish writer Maria Konopnicka was visited the village Konopnytsia. There is a record of the opening of the school in the village Konopnytsia (1914).

The village was inhabited again after the 1944-1946 forced resettlement of Ukrainians from Poland to the Soviet Union (Ukrainian SSR and Siberia).

Until 18 July 2020, Konopnytsi belonged to Pustomyty Raion. The raion was abolished in July 2020 as part of the administrative reform of Ukraine, which reduced the number of raions of Lviv Oblast to seven. The area of Pustomyty Raion was merged into Lviv Raion.

== Religious buildings ==
- Church of the Nativity the Blessed Virgin Mary (stone, 1993).

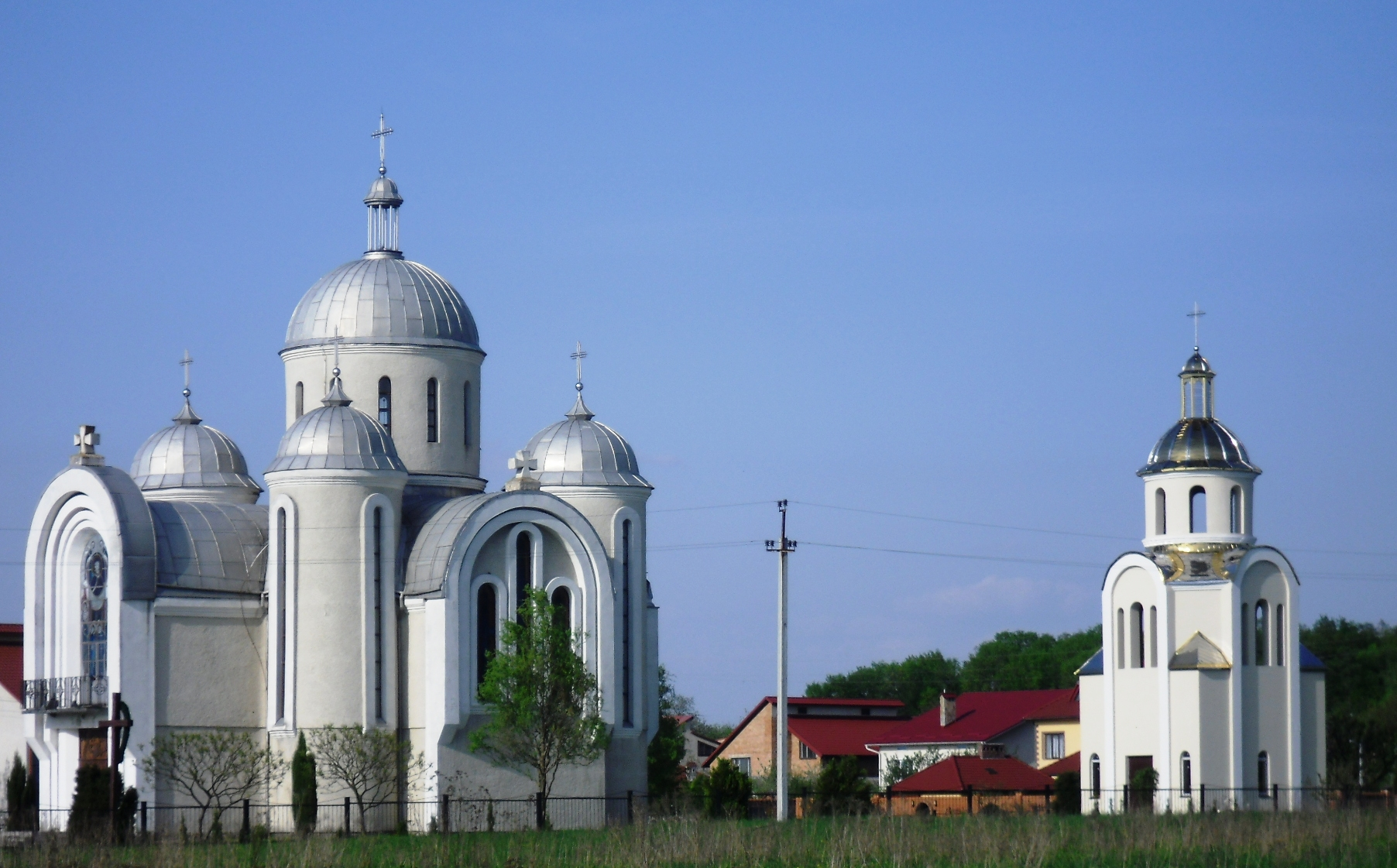
Church of the Nativity the Blessed Virgin Mary (stone, 1993)
