= Obroshyne =

Rural locality in Lviv Oblast, Ukraine

Obroshyne Обро́шине
- Village
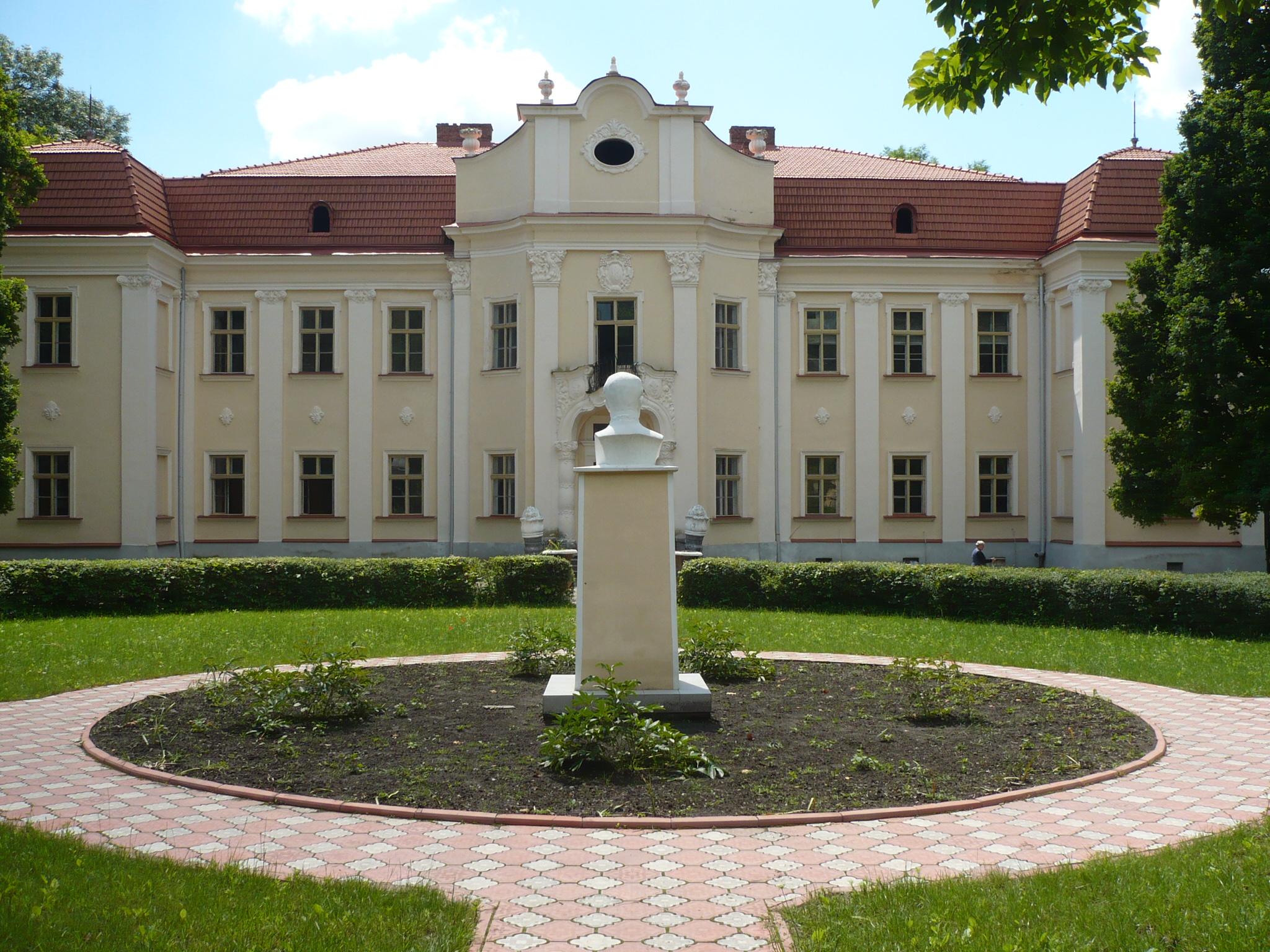
- Palace at Obroshyne, 1730

- Location within Lviv Oblast
- Coordinates: 49°47′07″N 23°52′07″E
- Country: Ukraine
- Oblast: Lviv Oblast
- District: Lviv Raion
- Established: 1447

Area
  - Total: 20 km^{2} (7.7 sq mi)
- Elevation /(average value of): 314 m (1,030 ft)

Population
  - Total: 4,186
  - Density: 2,093/km^{2} (5,420/sq mi)
- Time zone: UTC+2 (EET)
  - Summer (DST): UTC+3 (EEST)
- Postal code: 81115
- Area code: +380 3230
- Website: село Оброшине ^{(Ukrainian)}

Obroshyne (Ukrainian: Обро́шине) is a village in Lviv Raion, Lviv Oblast in western Ukraine. It hosts the administration of Obroshyne rural hromada, one of the hromadas of Ukraine. The population of the village is about 4186. Local government is administered by the village council.

== Geography ==
Obroshyne is located along Highway M06 (Ukraine) ( M 06), which goes from Kyiv to the Hungarian border near Chop. It is 16 kilometres (9.9 mi) from the regional center, Lviv, 8 kilometres (5.0 mi) from the district center, Pustomyty, and 274 kilometres (170 mi) from Chop. The village of Basivka is 4 kilometres (2.5 mi) away.

== History ==
The first written mention of the village of Obroshyne dates to 1447. In 1456 King Casimir IV Jagiellon of Poland gave the estate to the Roman Catholic Archdiocese of Lviv.

Until 18 July 2020, Obroshyne belonged to Pustomyty Raion. The raion was abolished in July 2020 as part of the administrative reform of Ukraine, which reduced the number of raions of Lviv Oblast to seven. The area of Pustomyty Raion was merged into Lviv Raion.

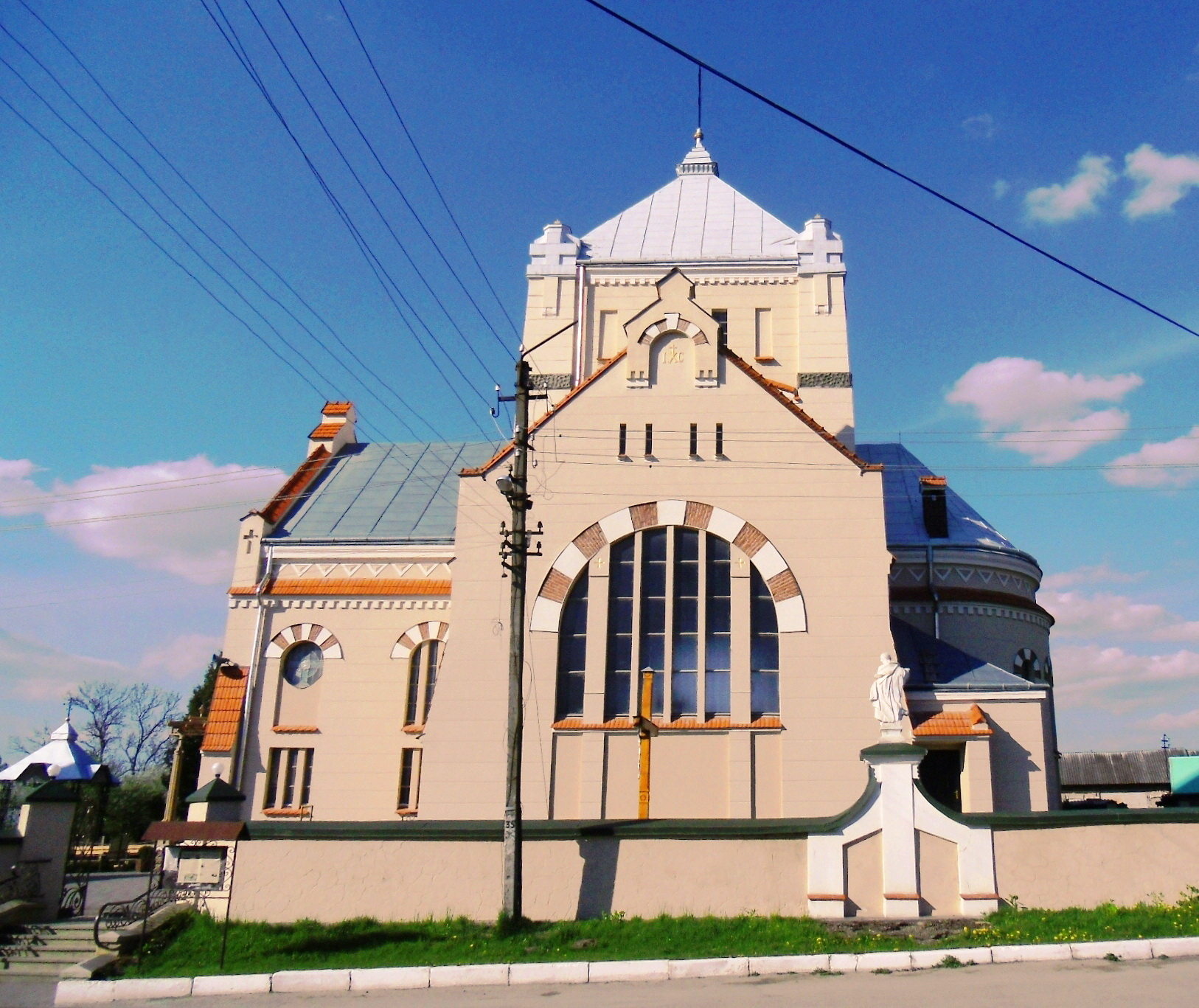
St. Demetrius church, 1914

== Religious buildings ==
- Church of St. Demetrius, 1914
- Roman Catholic Church, 1791 (in disrepair)

== Attractions ==
The village contains the following national heritage sites:

- Lviv Archbishops Residence, 1730 (number 477/0)
- Palace, 1730 ( number 477/1 )
- Bell tower of St. Demetrius, 1774 (number 491-M)

In addition, Obroshyn dendropark is of national importance.

== Notable residents ==
- Lev Shankovsky (1903 - 1995). He and his wife were schoolteachers in the locality.

== Sources ==
- Ukrainian: Історія міст і сіл УРСР : Львівська область. – К. : ГРУРЕ, 1968 р. Page 603
