= Basivka =

Basivka (Ukrainian: Басівка; Russian: Басовка) may refer to:

- Basivka, Lviv Oblast
- Basivka, Sumy Oblast
