= Stavchany, Lviv Oblast =

Village in Lviv Oblast, Ukraine

Stavchany Ставчани
- Village
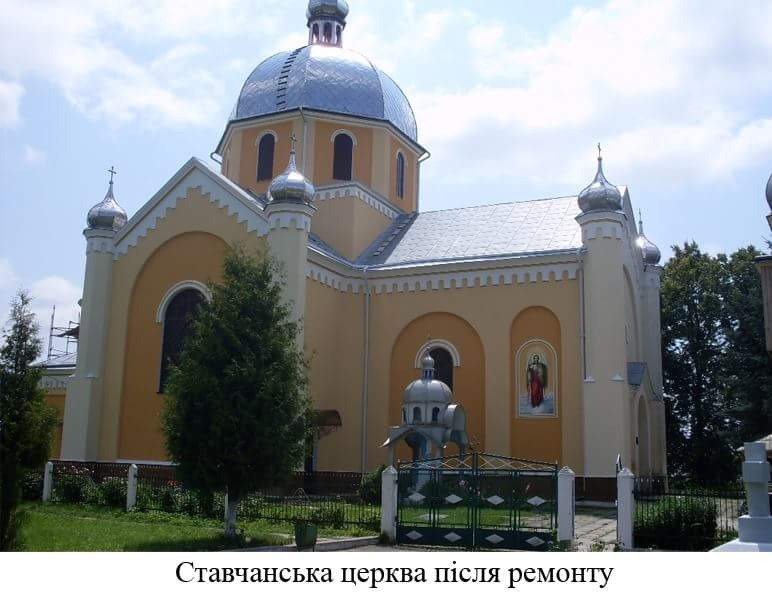

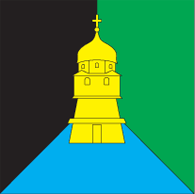
- Flag Coat of arms

- Location within Lviv Oblast Location within Ukraine
- Coordinates: 49°45′27″N 23°50′21″E
- Country: Ukraine
- Oblast: Lviv Oblast
- District: Lviv Raion
- Hromada: Pustomyty urban hromada

Area
  - Total: 4.56 km^{2} (1.76 sq mi)
- Elevation: 281 m (922 ft)

Population (2020)
  - Total: 1,775
  - Density: 389/km^{2} (1,010/sq mi)
- Time zone: UTC+2 (EET)
  - Summer (DST): UTC+3 (EEST)
- Postal code: 81118
- Area code: +380 3230

Stavchany (Ukrainian: Ставчани) is a village in Lviv Raion, Lviv Oblast, Ukraine. It belongs to Pustomyty urban hromada, one of the hromadas of Ukraine.

Until 18 July 2020, Stavchany belonged to Pustomyty Raion. The raion was abolished in July 2020 as part of the administrative reform of Ukraine, which reduced the number of raions of Lviv Oblast to seven.
