= Andriy Haydash =

Ukrainian footballer

Personal information
- Full name: Andriy Oleksandrovych Haydash
- Date of birth: 16 January 1989 (age 37)
- Place of birth: Simferopol, Ukrainian SSR
- Height: 1.86 m (6 ft 1 in)
- Position: Forward

Team information
- Current team: TSK Simferopol

Senior career*
Years	Team	Apps	(Gls)
2005–2007	Krymteplytsia Molodizhne	60	(1)
2008	Illichivets Mariupol	15	(1)
2009	Khimik Krasnoperekopsk		
2010–2011	Metalist Kharkiv	0	(0)
2011	Mykolaiv	2	(1)
2012	Tytan Armyansk	31	(5)
2013	Metalurh Zaporizhzhia	3	(0)
2014	Tytan Armyansk	4	(0)
2014–2016	SKA-Energiya Khabarovsk	27	(4)
2016–	TSK Simferopol		
- * Club domestic league appearances and goals as of 21 May 2016

Andriy Oleksandrovych Haydash (Ukrainian: Андрій Олександрович Гайдаш; born 16 January 1989) is a Ukrainian footballer who plays for TSK Simferopol. He is son of Oleksandr Haydash, former football player. He also holds Russian citizenship as Andrei Aleksandrovich Gaydash (Russian: Андрей Александрович Гайдаш).

He made his Russian National Football League debut for FC SKA-Energiya Khabarovsk on 6 July 2014 in a game against FC Luch-Energiya Vladivostok.
