= Soroky-Lvivski =

Village in Lviv Oblast, Ukraine

Soroky-Lvivski Сороки-Львівські Srokie Lwowskie
- Village
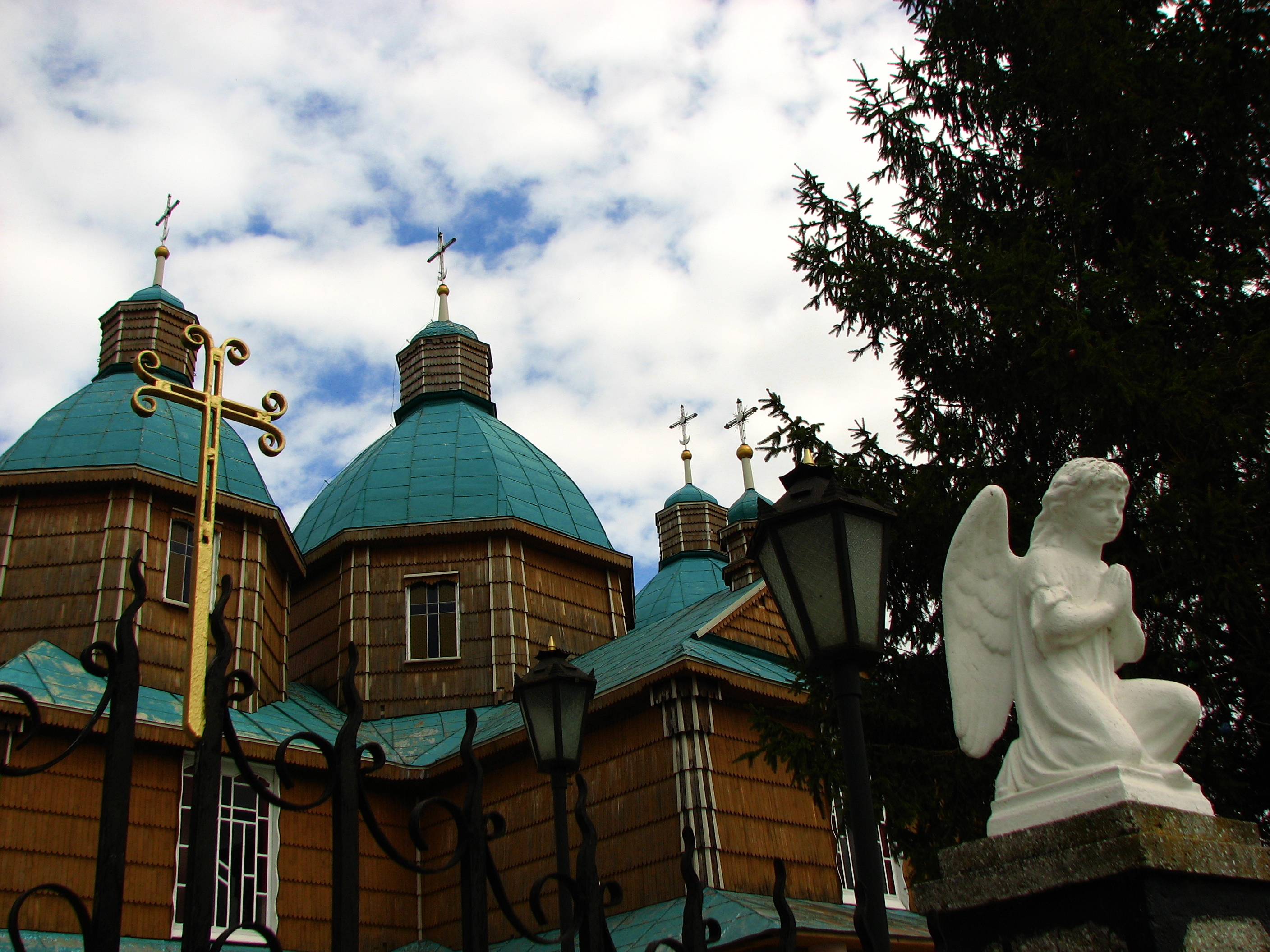
- The wooden Church of the Epiphany of the Lord in Soroky-Lvivski

- Location of Soroky-Lvivski in Lviv Oblast Location of Soroky-Lvivski in Ukraine
- Coordinates: 49°52′26″N 24°07′38″E
- Country: Ukraine
- Oblast: Lviv Oblast
- Raion: Lviv Raion
- First mentioned: 1421

Population
  - Total: 1,623

Soroky-Lvivski (Ukrainian: Сороки-Львівські; Polish: Srokie Lwowskie) is a village in Lviv Raion, Lviv Oblast, Ukraine. It is the centre of Murovane rural hromada, one of the hromadas of Ukraine. As of 2023, its population is 1,623.

== History ==
The first mention of Soroky-Lvivski was in 1421. Its wooden church, the Church of the Epiphany of the Lord, was built between 1900 and 1904, and based on the original church, which stood in the village from 1677 or 1689.

According to Volodymyr Kubijovyč, in 1939, Soroky-Lvivski had a population of 1,340, of whom 1,290 were Ukrainians, 40 were Latynnyky, 5 were Polish people, and 5 were Jewish.

== Notable residents ==
- Mykhailo Duda, Ukrainian Nazi collaborator and Ukrainian Insurgent Army lieutenant
- Roman Laba, Ukrainian former football striker and coach
