= Basivka, Lviv Oblast =

Rural locality in Lviv Oblast, Ukraine

Basivka Басі́вка
- Village
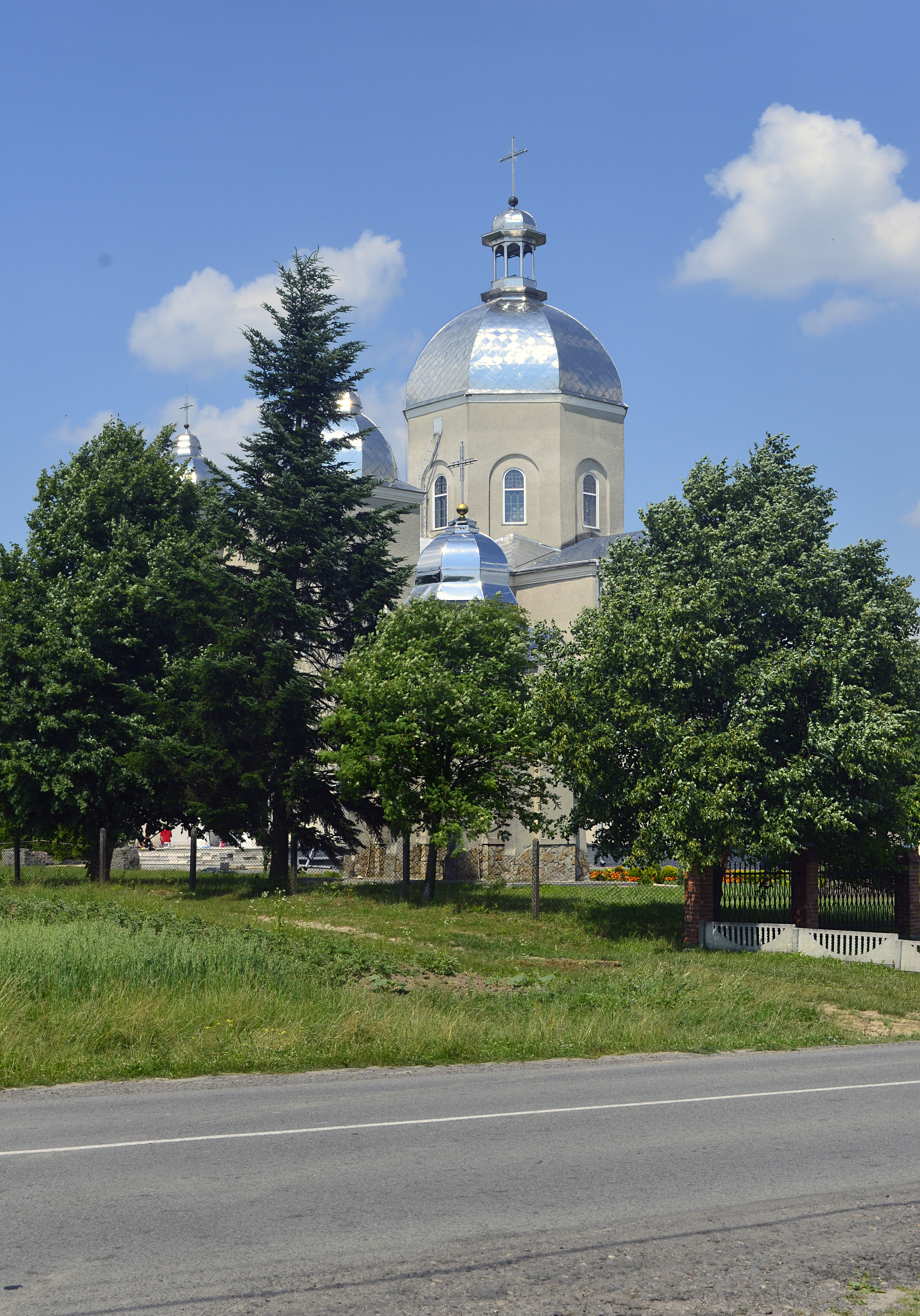
- Church of St. Peter and Paul in the Basivka.

- Location within Lviv Oblast
- Coordinates: 49°46′52″N 23°54′33″E
- Country: Ukraine
- Oblast: Lviv Oblast
- District: Lviv Raion
- Established: 1431

Area
  - Total: 239 km^{2} (92 sq mi)
- Elevation /(average value of): 305 m (1,001 ft)

Population
  - Total: 1,042
  - Density: 43,598/km^{2} (112,920/sq mi)
- Time zone: UTC+2 (EET)
  - Summer (DST): UTC+3 (EEST)
- Postal code: 81116
- Area code: +380 3230
- Website: село Басівка ^{(Ukrainian)}

Basivka (Ukrainian: Басі́вка) – village in Lviv Raion, Lviv Oblast in western Ukraine. It belongs to Sokilnyky rural hromada, one of the hromadas of Ukraine.

The village covers an area of 2,39 km^{2} at an altitude of 305 metres (1,000 ft) above sea level. The population of village is just about 1042 persons and local government is administered by the Hodovytsko-Basivska village council.

== Geography ==
The village is located at a distance 14 kilometres (8.7 mi) from the regional center Lviv to the southwest of Lviv ring road, 10 kilometres (6.2 mi) from the district center Pustomyty, and 4 kilometres (2.5 mi) from the village Obroshyne.

== History ==
The first mention of village has been in 1431.

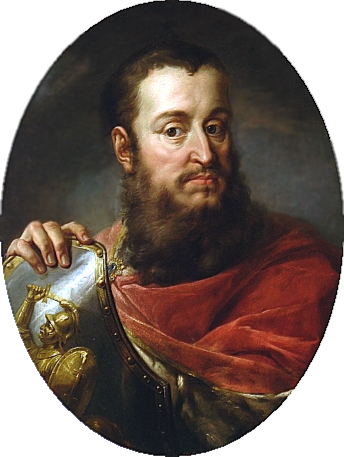
Portrait of Wladislaus II Jagiello.

Then the Polish King Władysław II Jagiełło donated to the Roman Catholic Archdiocese of Lviv 700 hectares of land near the village of Obroshyne.

Until 18 July 2020, Basivka belonged to Pustomyty Raion. The raion was abolished in July 2020 as part of the administrative reform of Ukraine, which reduced the number of raions of Lviv Oblast to seven. The area of Pustomyty Raion was merged into Lviv Raion.
