= Shchyrets =

Rural locality in Lviv Oblast, Ukraine

Shchyrets Щирець
- Rural settlement
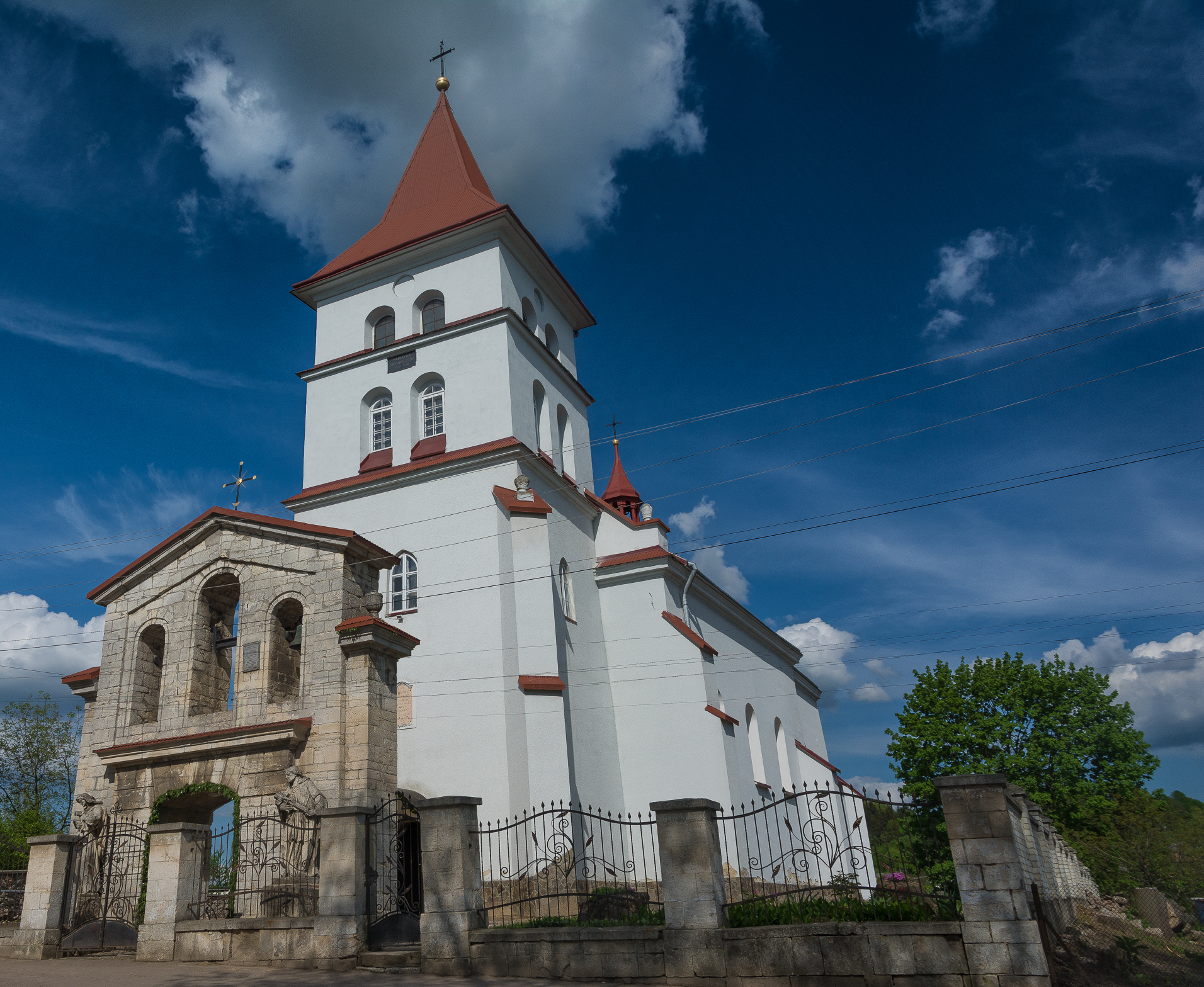

- Location in Lviv Oblast Location in Ukraine
- Coordinates: 49°39′10″N 23°51′22″E
- Country: Ukraine
- Oblast: Lviv Oblast
- Raion: Lviv Raion
- Hromada: Shchyrets settlement hromada

Population (2022)
  - Total: 5,659
- Time zone: UTC+2 (EET)
  - Summer (DST): UTC+3 (EEST)

Shchyrets (Ukrainian: Щирець, Polish: Szczerzec) is a rural settlement in Lviv Raion of Lviv Oblast in Ukraine. It is located on the Shchyrka, in the drainage basin of the Dniester. Shchyrets hosts the administration of Shchyrets settlement hromada, one of the hromadas of Ukraine. Population: 5,659 (2022 estimate).

== History ==
Until 18 July 2020, Shchyrets belonged to Pustomyty Raion. The raion was abolished in July 2020 as part of the administrative reform of Ukraine, which reduced the number of raions of Lviv Oblast to seven. The area of Pustomyty Raion was merged into Lviv Raion.

Until 26 January 2024, Shchyrets was designated urban-type settlement. On this day, a new law entered into force which abolished this status, and Shchyrets became a rural settlement.

Second World War Polish Army commander Gen. Stanisław Maczek hailed from Shchyrets.

== Economy ==
=== Transportation ===
There are two railway stations in the settlement, Shchyrets I and Shchyrets II. They are both on the railway connecting Lviv and Stryi.

Shchyrets is embedded into the dense road network south of Lviv. In particular, it has access to Highway M06 which connects Lviv and Uzhhorod.
