= Obroshyne rural hromada =

Hromada in Lviv Oblast, Ukraine

Obroshyne rural hromada Оброшинська сільська громада
- Hromada
- Interactive map of Obroshyne rural hromada
- Country: Ukraine
- Oblast: Lviv Oblast
- Raion: Lviv Raion
- Administrative center: Obroshyne

Area
  - Total: 498 km^{2} (192 sq mi)

Population (2021)
  - Total: 7,661
  - Density: 15.4/km^{2} (39.8/sq mi)
- CATOTTG code: UA46060310000086550
- Settlements: 6
- Villages: 6
- Website: obroshynska-gromada.gov.ua

Obroshyne rural hromada (Ukrainian: Оброшинська сільська громада) is a hromada in Ukraine, in Lviv Raion of Lviv Oblast. The administrative center is the village of Obroshyne.

== Settlements ==
The hromada consists of 6 villages:

- Dibrivky
- Konopnytsia
- Obroshyne
- Pidhaitsi
- Pryshliaky
- Stavchany
