= Murovane, Lviv Raion, Lviv Oblast =

Village in Lviv Oblast

Murovane Муроване Murowane
- Village
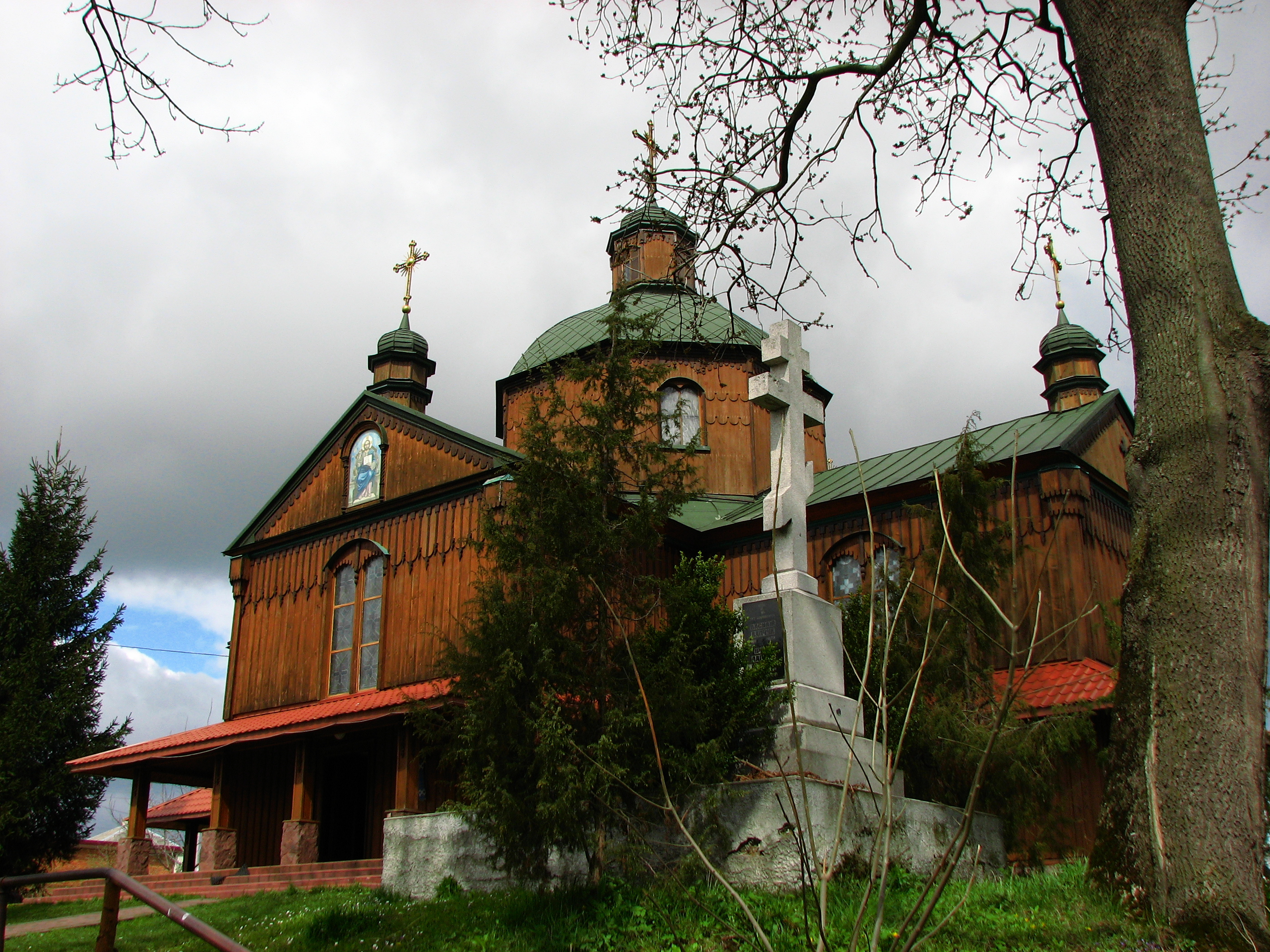
- The wooden Church of the Introduction to the Temple of the Holy Mother of God in Murovane

- Location of Murovane in Lviv Oblast Location of Murovane in Ukraine
- Coordinates: 49°52′48″N 24°05′41″E
- Country: Ukraine
- Oblast: Lviv Oblast
- Raion: Lviv Raion
- First mentioned: 1454

Population
  - Total: 4,630

Murovane (Ukrainian: Муроване; Polish: Murowane), formerly Liashky Murovani (Ukrainian: Ляшки Муровані; Polish: Laszki Murowane) is a village in Ukraine, in Lviv Raion within Lviv Oblast. It is part of Murovane rural hromada, and it has a population of 4,630 (as of 2023).

== History ==
Murovane was first mentioned in 1454, and was historically dominated by a local vegetable farming industry. In 1939, according to Volodymyr Kubijovyč, the village had a population of 1,320. Of this population, 1,090 were Ukrainians, 200 were Polish people (including 80 Osadniks), 20 were Latynnyky, and ten were Jews.

In the present day, there remains a moderately-sized Polish community in Murovane; according to the Encyclopedia of Modern Ukraine, Poles comprise around 5% of the population, as of 2001.

== Notable residents ==
- Petro Orlovskyi, Armed Forces of Ukraine soldier killed during the Battle of Debaltseve
- Volodymyr Petryshyn, Ukrainian-American mathematician
- Ivan Siiak, Ukrainian-Soviet revolutionary and military commander
- Mariia Siiak, Ukrainian opera singer
- Ostap Siiak, Ukrainian conductor and politician
- Ihor Yavorskyi, Ukrainian former footballer and football manager
