= Roman Marych =

Ukrainian footballer and coach (born 1977)

Personal information
- Full name: Roman Rostyslavovych Marych
- Date of birth: 17 July 1977 (age 49)
- Place of birth: Lviv, Ukrainian SSR, Soviet Union, now Ukraine
- Height: 1.80 m (5 ft 11 in)
- Position: Striker

Team information
- Current team: Sambir-Nyva-2

Youth career
- 1993: Youth Sportive School Lviv

Senior career*
Years	Team	Apps	(Gls)
1994	FC Karpaty Lviv	1	(0)
1995–1996	FC Skala Stryi	9	(1)
1997–1998	FC Haray Zhovkva	56	(10)
1999–2000	FC Zakarpattia Uzhhorod	37	(4)
2000–2002	FC Dynamo Lviv	37	(3)
2002–2003	FC Tekhno-Tsentr Rohatyn	20	(1)
2004	FC Sokil Berezhany	1	(0)
2006	FC Sokil Sukhovolya	4	(0)

International career
1994	Ukraine-16	2	(3)

Managerial career
- 2006–200?: FC Lviv (youth school)
- 200?–2011: FC Haray Zhovkva
- 2011–2012: FC Lviv (interim)
- 2012: FC Lviv (assistant)
- 2025–: Sambir-Nyva-2
- * Club domestic league appearances and goals

Roman Marych (Ukrainian: Роман Ростиславович Марич; born 17 July 1977) is a former Ukrainian football striker, and currently a manager of Sambir-Nyva-2 in the Ukrainian Second League.

== Coaching career ==
After he retired from playing football, he was invited to work as an assistant coach in 2006.

On 25 September 2011, Marych became the new interim coach of FC Lviv in the Ukrainian First League.
