= Oleksandr Haydash =

Ukrainian footballer (born 1967)

Personal information
- Full name: Oleksandr Mykolayovych Haydash
- Date of birth: 7 August 1967 (age 59)
- Place of birth: Zhdanov, Ukrainian SSR, Soviet Union
- Height: 1.88 m (6 ft 2 in)
- Position: Striker

Team information
- Current team: FC TSK Simferopol (general director)

Senior career*
Years	Team	Apps	(Gls)
1984	Novator Zhdanov	16	(6)
1984–1986	Shakhtar Donetsk	4	(0)
1986–1987	SKA Kyiv	16	(4)
1987	CSKA Moscow	0	(0)
1988	Novator Zhdanov	33	(6)
1989–1991	Tavriya Simferopol	113	(52)
1991–1992	Sarıyer	9	(4)
1992–1993	Tavriya Simferopol	22	(9)
1993–1994	Maccabi Herzliya	6	(1)
1994–1995	Tavriya Simferopol	43	(19)
1995–1996	Maccabi Yavne	20	(9)
1996–1999	Tavriya Simferopol	100	(42)
1997	→ Dynamo Saky (loan)	1	(1)
2000–2001	Metalurh Mariupol	41	(10)
2001	→ Metalurh-2 Mariupol	4	(2)
2002–2003	Tavriya Simferopol	53	(16)
2003	→ Dynamo Simferopol (loan)	1	(0)
Total		482	(181)

International career
1993	Ukraine	2	(0)

Managerial career
- 2005–2006: Yalos Yalta
- 2006–2007: Krymteplytsia Molodizhne
- 2008–2009: Feniks-Illichovets Kalinine
- 2012: Tytan Armyansk
- 2016–: TSK Simferopol
- * Club domestic league appearances and goals

Oleksandr Mykolayovych Haydash (Ukrainian: Олександр Миколайович Гайдаш; Aleksandr Nikolaevich Gaydash (Russian: Александр Николаевич Гайдаш); born 7 August 1967 in Zhdanov (now Mariupol), Ukrainian SSR) is a former Ukrainian (until 2014) and Russian (since 2014) professional football striker and current manager.

== Career ==
He played for FC Shakhtar Donetsk, SC Tavriya Simferopol and FC Metalurh Mariupol' in Ukraine and Sarıyer G.K. in the Turkish Süper Lig. He is one of the leading goal-scorer (95) in the Ukrainian Premier League. He also scored 62 goals in the Soviet championship for SC Tavriya Simferopol.

Haydash made two appearances for the Ukraine national football team.

After the annexation of Crimea to Russia he took Russian citizenship. Under the russified name Aleksandr Gaydash in 2014 he became a general director of TSK Simferopol.

He is the father of Andriy Gaydash.
