= Serhiy Kozlov =

Personal information
- Full name: Serhiy Valentynovych Kozlov
- Date of birth: 16 December 1957 (age 68)
- Place of birth: Sverdlovsk Oblast, Russian SFSR
- Position: Midfielder

Team information
- Current team: FC Tytan Armyansk (caretaker)

Senior career*
Years	Team	Apps	(Gls)
1979–1981	FC Kryvbas Kryvyi Rih		
1981	FC Tytan Armyansk		
1982–1983	FC Atlantyka Sevastopol		
1983–1996	FC Tytan Armyansk		

Managerial career
- 1996: FC Tytan Armyansk (assistant)
- 1996–1999: FC Tytan Armyansk (youth team)
- 2000–2001: FC Tytan Armyansk (assistant)
- 2001–2004: FC Tytan Armyansk
- 2004–2005: FC Hirnyk Kryvyi Rih
- 2005–2012: FC Tytan Armyansk (assistant)
- 2012: FC Tytan Armyansk (caretaker)
- 2012–2014: FC Tytan Armyansk (assistant)
- 2014: FC Tytan Armyansk (caretaker)
- * Club domestic league appearances and goals

Serhiy Kozlov (Ukrainian: Сергій Валентинович Козлов; born 16 December 1957 in Sverdlovsk Oblast) is a retired Soviet and Ukrainian football player and a current Ukrainian football coach.
