= Roman Laba =

Ukrainian former football striker and coach

Personal information
- Full name: Roman Romanovych Laba
- Date of birth: 30 November 1966 (age 59)
- Place of birth: Soroky-Lvivski, Ukrainian SSR, Soviet Union (now Ukraine)
- Height: 1.80 m (5 ft 11 in)
- Position: Striker

Youth career
- 1983–1984: SKA Lviv

Senior career*
Years	Team	Apps	(Gls)
1985–1987	Zirka Berdychiv	?	(?)
1988	Torpedo Lutsk	?	(?)
1989–1992	Karpaty Lviv	125	(18)
1992–1993	Bukovyna Chernivtsi	24	(0)
1993	Veres Rivne	2	(0)
1993	Nord-AM-Podillya Khmelnytskyi	1	(0)
1994	Skala Stryi	18	(0)
1994–1995	Kremin Kremenchuk	7	(1)
1995	Shakhtar Novovolynsk (amateurs)	4	(0)
1995	Skify Lviv	18	(5)
1996	Hazovyk Komarno	8	(0)

Managerial career
- 1996: Dobrosyn
- 1997–2000: Haray Zhovkva
- 2000–2005: Veres Rivne (Dir. of sport)
- 2005–2006: Knyazha Shchaslyve
- 2006–2012: FC Lviv (Dir. of sport)
- 2008: Lviv (interim)
- 2011: Lviv (interim)
- * Club domestic league appearances and goals

Roman Romanovych Laba (Ukrainian: Роман Романович Лаба; born 30 November 1966) is a Ukrainian former football striker, and currently interim coach of Lviv in the Ukrainian First League.

== Coaching career ==
After he retired from playing football, he was invited to work as an assistant coach in 1996.

At the end of June 2011, Laba became the new interim coach of FC Lviv in the Ukrainian First League.
