= Murovane rural hromada =

Hromada in Lviv Oblast, Ukraine

Murovane rural hromada Мурованська сільська громада
- Hromada
- Interactive map of Murovane rural hromada
- Country: Ukraine
- Oblast: Lviv Oblast
- Raion: Lviv Raion
- Admin. center: Murovane

Area
  - Total: 431 km^{2} (166 sq mi)

Population (2021)
  - Total: 9,617
  - Density: 22.3/km^{2} (57.8/sq mi)
- CATOTTG code: UA46060270000027170
- Settlements: 5
- Villages: 5
- Website: murovanska-gromada.gov.ua

Murovane rural hromada (Ukrainian: Мурованська сільська громада) is a hromada in Ukraine, in Lviv Raion of Lviv Oblast. The administrative center is the village of Murovane.

== Settlements ==
The hromada consists of 5 villages:

- Hamaliivka
- Kamianopil
- Murovane
- Soroky-Lvivski
- Yampil
