= FC Tytan Armiansk =

- Full name: Futbol′nyy klub Tytan Armiansk
- Founded: 1969
- Dissolved: 2014
- Ground: "Khimik", Armiansk, Crimea
- Capacity: 5000
- League: Ukrainian First League
- 2013–14: 13th

FC Tytan Armiansk (Ukrainian: ФК Титан; Russian: ФК Титан) was a football club based in Armiansk, Autonomous Republic of Crimea. The club last played in the Persha Liha during the 2013–14 season. The club was dissolved due to the annexation of Crimea by the Russian Federation.

Colors are (Home) gold shirts, black shorts. (Away) white shirts, black shorts.

== History ==
The first official name the team received was Stroitel (The Builder) in 1969, although, the team already existed and participated in the regional competitions since 1964, but without a real name. The team began to play its games on some quickly cleared up area for a football field. Simultaneously, the construction of a new stadium started as well. The main and only sponsor of the team was a local chemical plant, the director, Vsevolod Stepanov, of which decided to change the name for the team to "Tytan" in 1973. The name was introduced to symbolize the power, in sport as well, of the real giant of chemical industry in the whole southern region of the country. In 1974 the team entered a semi-professional competition. In the same year "Tytan" received at its exploitation a new stadium, "Khimik" (5000 seats). And in 1975 the new unofficial club was founded with its own headquarters and stadium, which included three playing fields and its own swimming pool. The first club president was Stepanov Vsevolod Mykolayovich. The first stadium director became Kohut Ivan Dmytrovich. The first team manager was Basov Herman Nizamovich. The first match at the "Khimik" stadium took place on the Victory Day of 1975 (9 May 1975) "FC Tytan Armiansk"-"Tavriya Simferopol" 2:2 (2 goals for "Tytan" were scored by Anatolij Lebid).

== Honours ==
- Ukrainian Second League (3rd Tier)

2009–10

- Ukrainian Amateur Cup

1977

- Crimea championship (Soviet/Ukrainian Lower Tier)

1975, 1976, 1977, 1978, 1979, 1980, 1981, 1983, 1984, 1986, 1988, 1990 (12×)

- Crimean Cup

1976, 1977, 1978, 1979, 1981, 1985, 1987, 1989, 1990 (9×)

== League and cup history ==
=== Soviet Union ===
"KFK" Zone Groups(semi-professional level)
in 1974 the team placed 5th
1975—2nd	1985—3rd
1976—1st	1986—2nd
1977—1st	1987—4th
1978—1st	1988—4th
1979—2nd	1989—6th
1980—2nd	1990—8th
1981—2nd	1991—1st
1982—3rd

=== Ukraine ===
Season	Div.	Pos.	Pl.	W	D	L	GS	GA	P	Domestic Cup	Europe	Notes
1992	3rd "B"	2	16	8	5	3	19	10	21	Did not qualify		
1992–93	3rd	17	34	10	6	18	42	54	26	1/64 finals		
1993–94	3rd	14	42	13	12	17	47	38	38	1/64 finals		
1994–95	3rd	6	42	22	10	10	68	36	76	1/32 finals		
1995–96	3rd "B"	6	38	19	10	9	59	38	67	1/64 finals		
1996–97	3rd "B"	2	32	17	6	7	51	29	57	1/64 finals		
1997–98	3rd "B"	8	34	11	9	12	36	36	42	1/32 finals		
1998–99	3rd "B"	9	26	10	6	10	31	38	36	1/64 finals		
1999-00	3rd "B"	6	26	11	4	11	30	34	37	1/8 finals Second League Cup		
2000–01	3rd "B"	4	28	14	8	6	38	21	50	1/16 finals forfeit		
2001–02	3rd "B"	13	34	10	10	14	32	42	40	1/64 finals		
2002–03	3rd "B"	12	30	8	5	17	30	48	29	1/32 finals		
2003–04	3rd "B"	9	30	10	10	10	31	31	40	1/16 finals		
2004–05	3rd "B"	4	26	13	5	8	44	32	44	1/32 finals		
2005–06	3rd "B"	10	28	8	9	11	33	39	33	1/32 finals		
2006–07	3rd "B"	3	28	16	8	4	48	21	56	1/8 finals		
2007–08	3rd "B"	2	34	22	5	7	74	39	71	1/16 finals		
2008–09	3rd "B"	4	34	19	7	8	55	31	64	1/64 finals		
2009–10	3rd "B"	1	26	21	3	2	50	20	66	1/32 finals		Promoted
2010–11	2nd	11	34	13	5	16	32	42	44	1/16 finals		
2011–12	2nd	14	34	9	5	20	33	59	32	1/16 finals		
2012–13	2nd	12	34	13	9	12	44	40	48	1/32 finals		
2013–14	2nd	13	29 (Note: Round 29 match against Olimpik Donetsk was not played. Administration of Olimpik Donetsk informed that the club would not travel to their Round 29 match due to instability in the region. PFL did not resolve the result of this match hence the official records indicate one less match for the season.)	9	8	12	32	41	35	1/32 finals		Dissolved

== Coaches ==
- (Soviet Union) Eduard Fedin (1974–1975)
- (Soviet Union) Herman Basov (1975–)
- (Ukraine) Serhiy Kozlov (2001–2004)
- (Ukraine) Anatoliy Borysenko (2005–2006)
- (Kazakhstan) Serhiy Shevchenko (2006–2008)
- (Ukraine) Mykola Fedorenko (2008–2012)
- (Ukraine) Serhiy Kozlov (2012)^{c}
- (Ukraine) Oleksandr Haydash (2012)
- (Ukraine) Oleh Leshchynskyi (2012–2013)
