= Shchyrets settlement hromada =

Hromada in Lviv Oblast, Ukraine

Shchyrets settlement hromada Щирецька селищна громада
- Hromada
- Interactive map of Shchyrets settlement hromada
- Country: Ukraine
- Oblast: Lviv Oblast
- Raion: Lviv Raion
- Admin. center: Shchyrets

Area
  - Total: 1,145 km^{2} (442 sq mi)

Population (2021)
  - Total: 11,696
  - Density: 10.21/km^{2} (26.46/sq mi)
- CATOTTG code: UA46060450000037997
- Settlements: 17
- Rural settlements: 1
- Villages: 16
- Website: shchyretska-hromada.gov.ua

Shchyrets settlement hromada (Ukrainian: Щирецька селищна громада) is a hromada in Ukraine, in Lviv Raion of Lviv Oblast. The administrative center is the rural settlement of Shchyrets. It was formed on 10 July 2017 by merging the Shchyrets settlement council and the Humenets, Dmytre, Pisky, and Sokolivka village councils of the Pustomyty Raion.

== Settlements ==
The hromada consists of 1 rural settlement (Shchyrets) and 16 villages:

- Horbachi
- Humenets
- Dmytre
- Dubianka
- Lany
- Liopy
- Nykonkovychi
- Odynoke
- Pisky
- Popeliany
- Serdytsia
- Sokolivka
- Soroky
- Cherkasy
- Shufrahanka
- Yastrubkiv
