= Pidberiztsi rural hromada =

Hromada in Lviv Oblast, Ukraine

Pidberiztsi rural hromada Підберізцівська сільська громада
- Hromada
- Interactive map of Pidberiztsi rural hromada
- Country: Ukraine
- Oblast: Lviv Oblast
- Raion: Lviv Raion
- Administrative center: Pidberiztsi

Area
  - Total: 1,241 km^{2} (479 sq mi)

Population (2021)
  - Total: 8,203
  - Density: 6.610/km^{2} (17.12/sq mi)
- CATOTTG code: UA46060350000036006
- Settlements: 11
- Villages: 11
- Website: pidberizcivska-gromada.gov.ua

Pidberiztsi rural hromada (Ukrainian: Підберізцівська сільська громада) is a hromada in Ukraine, in Lviv Raion of Lviv Oblast. The administrative center is the village of Pidberiztsi.

== Settlements ==
The hromada consists of 11 villages:

- Verkhnia Bilka
- Hlukhovychi
- Zhuravnyky
- Myklashiv
- Nyzhnia Bilka
- Pidberiztsi
- Pidhirne
- Sukhorichchia
- Tarasivka
- Chyzhykiv
- Chornushovychi
