= Pidberiztsi, Lviv Oblast =

Village in Lviv Oblast, Ukraine

Pidberiztsi Підберізці
- Village
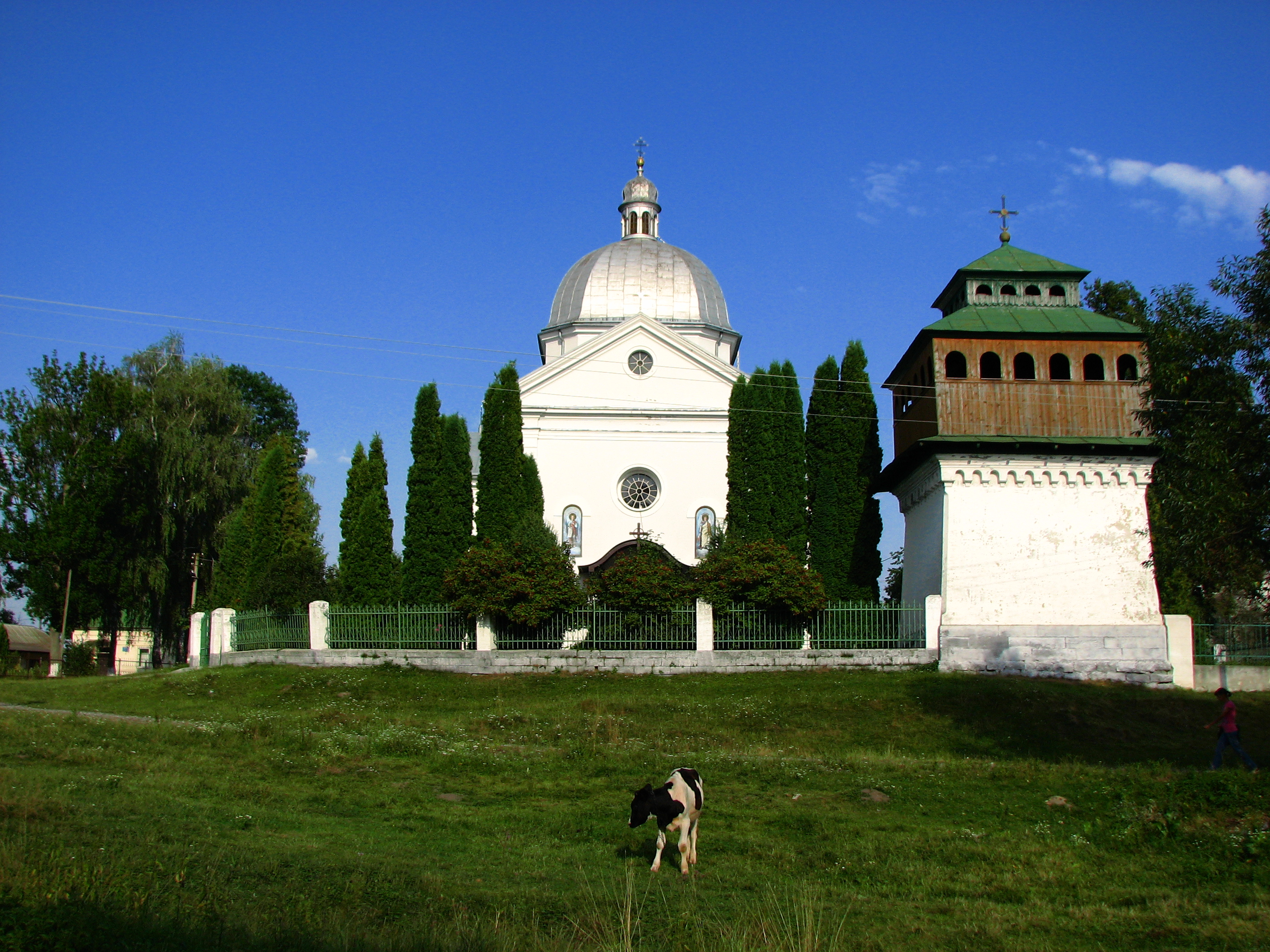
- The Church of Saint Archangel Michael in Pidberiztsi

- Location of Pidberiztsi in Lviv Oblast Location of Pidberiztsi in Ukraine
- Coordinates: 49°59′33″N 24°14′18″E
- Country: Ukraine
- Oblast: Lviv Oblast
- Raion: Lviv Raion
- Hromada: Pidberiztsi rural hromada
- First mentioned: 1352

Population
  - Total: 1,207

Pidberiztsi (Ukrainian: Підберізці; Polish: Podbereźce), until 1990 written as Pidbereztsi (Ukrainian: Підберезці), is a village in Lviv Raion, Lviv Oblast, in western Ukraine. It is the administrative centre of Pidberiztsi rural hromada, one of the hromadas of Ukraine. Its population is 1,207 (as of 2024).

== Overview ==
Pidberiztsi was first mentioned in 1352. It was written as Pidbereztsi until 18 December 1990, when it was changed to its current name. The village is most well known for the Church of Saint Archangel Michael, a national landmark of cultural heritage and a church belonging to the Orthodox Church of Ukraine. Its interior was painted by Modest Sosenko.

Pidberiztsi is also home to a beach, which was created from an artificial lake as part of a 2018 project aimed at providing greater recreational activities to the village's inhabitants.

== Notable people ==
- Ivan Baltro, sotnik of the Ukrainian Galician Army.
- Stepan Chornii, linguist and academic in the Ukrainian diaspora.
- Hanna Dmyterko, soldier
- Iosyf Ostashevskyi, deacon of the Ukrainian Greek Catholic Church
- Mariia Ostromyra, writer and historian.
- Ivan Vesna, sculptor.
