= Mykola Fedorenko =

Ukrainian Soviet footballer

Personal information
- Full name: Mykola Ivanovych Fedorenko
- Date of birth: 31 July 1955 (age 71)
- Place of birth: Ordzhonikidze, Ukrainian SSR
- Height: 1.70 m (5 ft 7 in)
- Positions: Striker; midfielder

Youth career
- Ordzhonikidze
- Avangard Svitlovodsk

Senior career*
Years	Team	Apps	(Gls)
1973–1981	Shakhtar Donetsk	95	(32)
1982–1985	Dnipro Dnipropetrovsk	54	(9)
1985–1988	Kolos Nikopol	121	(34)
1988–1989	Zirka Kirovohrad	56	(10)
1990	Torpedo Zaporizhzhia	35	(5)

International career
1979	Ukraine		
1980	Soviet Union	2	(1)

Managerial career
- 1987: Kolos Nikopol (director)
- 1991: Dnipro Dnipropetrovsk (assistant)
- 1992–1993: Zirka Kirovohrad
- 1993: Sirius Zhovti Vody
- 1995–1996: Vodnyk Kherson
- 1996: Dnipro Dnipropetrovsk (assistant)
- 1997: Ahrovest Novooleksandrivka
- 1998: Dnipro-2 Dnipropetrovsk
- 1999: Dnipro Dnipropetrovsk (assistant)
- 1999–2001: Dnipro Dnipropetrovsk
- 2001–2002: Shakhtar-2 Donetsk
- 2002–2003: Shakhtar Donetsk (assistant)
- 2003–2006: Shakhtar-2 Donetsk
- 2006–2009: Shakhtar Donetsk (reserves)
- 2009–2012: Tytan Armyansk
- 2013–2014: Zirka Kirovohrad
- * Club domestic league appearances and goals

Mykola (or Nikolai) Ivanovych Fedorenko (Ukrainian: Микола Іванович Федоренко) (born 31 July 1955 in Ordzhonikidze, Ukraine) is a retired Soviet football player and a current Ukrainian football coach.

== Honours ==
- Soviet Top League winner: 1983.
- Soviet Cup winner: 1980.

== International career ==
Fedorenko made his debut for USSR on 26 March 1980 in a friendly against Bulgaria. He scored a goal in his second (and last) game for USSR – a friendly against Sweden on 29 April 1980.

In 1979 Fedorenko played couple of games for Ukraine at the Spartakiad of the Peoples of the USSR.
