= Pustomyty urban hromada =

Hromada in Lviv Oblast, Ukraine

Pustomyty urban hromada Пустомитівська міська громада
- Hromada
- Seal
- Interactive map of Pustomyty urban hromada
- Country: Ukraine
- Oblast: Lviv Oblast
- Raion: Lviv Raion
- Admin. center: Pustomyty

Area
  - Total: 974 km^{2} (376 sq mi)

Population (2021)
  - Total: 15,172
  - Density: 15.6/km^{2} (40.3/sq mi)
- CATOTTG code: UA46060370000065608
- Settlements: 10
- Cities: 1
- Villages: 9
- Website: pustomyty-gromada.gov.ua

Pustomyty urban hromada (Ukrainian: Пустомитівська міська громада) is a hromada in Ukraine, in Lviv Raion of Lviv Oblast. The administrative center is the city of Pustomyty.

== Settlements ==
The hromada consists of 1 city (Pustomyty) and 9 villages:

- Berehy
- Viniavy
- Dybianky
- Malynivka
- Myloshevychi
- Mistky
- Navariia
- Polianka
- Semenivka
