= Pustomyty =

City in Lviv Oblast, Ukraine

- City
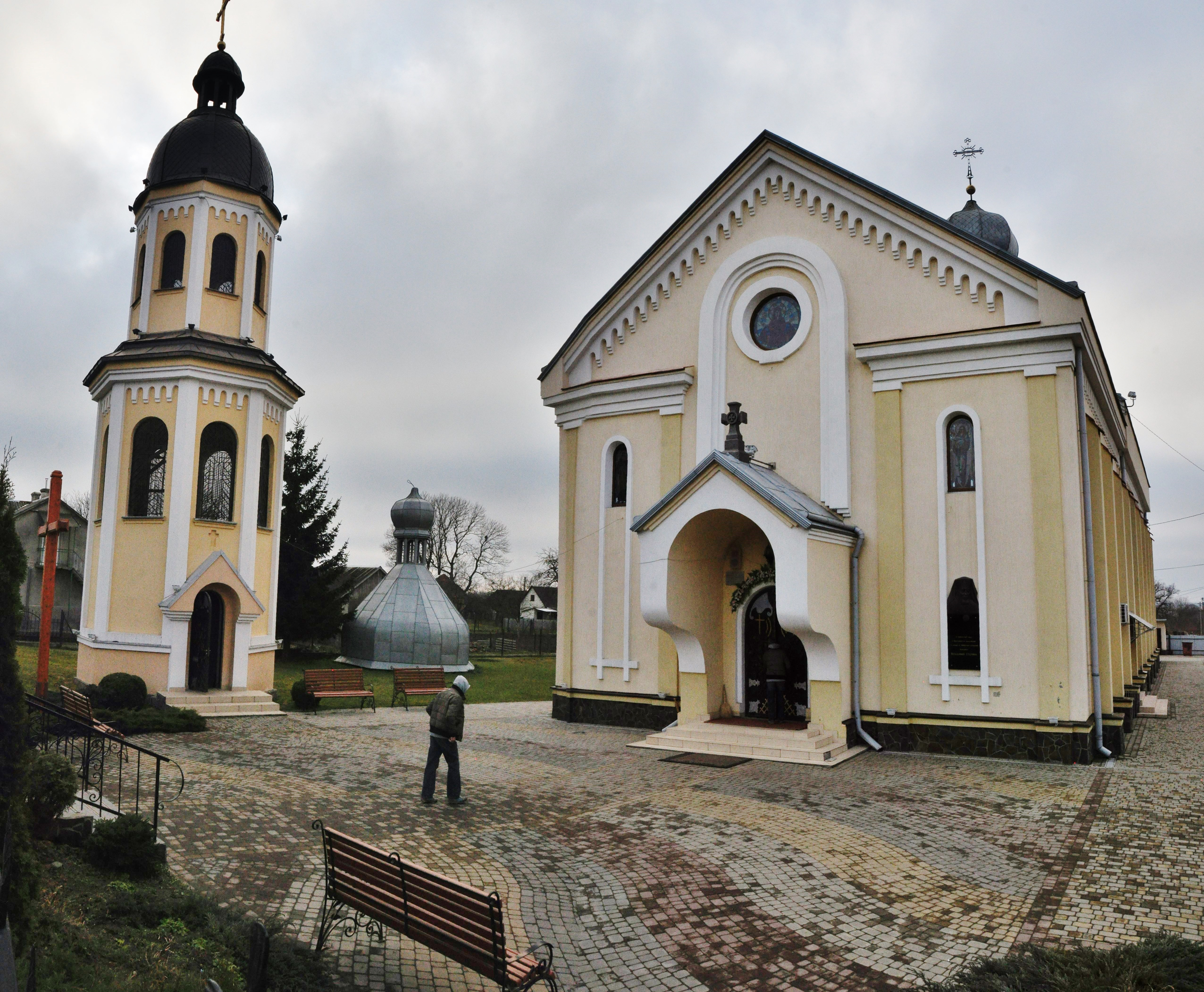
- Saint Nicholas Church

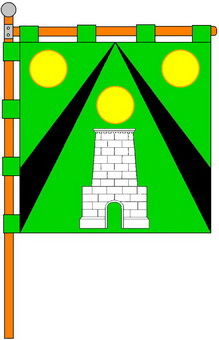
- Flag Coat of arms

- Location within Lviv Oblast Location within Ukraine
- Coordinates: 49°42′50″N 23°54′39″E
- Country: Ukraine
- Oblast: Lviv Oblast
- Raion: Lviv Raion
- Hromada: Pustomyty urban hromada
- First mentioned: 1441
- City status: 1988

Area
  - Total: 9,372 km^{2} (3,619 sq mi)

Population (2022)
  - Total: 9,372
  - Density: 1.000/km^{2} (2.590/sq mi)
- Time zone: UTC+2 (EET)
  - Summer (DST): UTC+3 (EEST)
- Postal code: 81100
- Area code: +380-3230

Pustomyty (Ukrainian: Пустомити, IPA: [pʊstoˈmɪtɪ], locally [pʊˈstɔmɪtɪ]) is a small city in Lviv Raion, Lviv Oblast (region) of Ukraine. It hosts the administration of Pustomyty urban hromada, one of the hromadas of Ukraine. Population: 9,372 (2022 estimate).

For centuries Pustomyty belonged to Ruthenian Voivodeship, Kingdom of Poland. In 1772 it was annexed by the Habsburg Empire (see Partitions of Poland), where it remained until late 1918. In the Second Polish Republic, Pustomyty was part of Lwów Voivodeship.

Pustomyty is a small town located in south-western outskirt of Lviv city. It is the administrative center of Pustomyty district (since 1959). The town lies on the intersection of railway line Lviv-Stryi-Chop and local road T-1416 Lviv-Medenychi.

The earliest mention of the settlement in official documents is dated by 1441. The name most likely has geographical origins. In ancient times there was a village named Myto (Мито, literally "customs") here and it served as customs between Przemysl and Zvenigorod principalities. However, the locality had lost the importance after some time and the name was transformed into Puste Myto (Пусте Мито, literally "empty customs").

A mineral-water resort operated in Pustomyty in the late 19th to early 20th century. Baths were located in several villas and were able to accommodate 150–200 guests. None of those buildings survived till this day, except a small palace in the central town park.

In September 1942, the Tomb of Liberty was dedicated on the outskirts of Pustomyty, near the reading room, in memory of those who died in the fight against Bolshevism.

On April 15, 1943, the Nazis set up a forced labor camp near the Hlynske factories. It housed 228 Jews who were used to work at the lime factory. On 25 July 1943, 202 prisoners were shot dead.

Pustomyty obtained the town status in 1988, as the result of merge with neighboring villages Hlynna-Navariia and Lisnevychi. Yellow circles of the town emblem represent this union. Also the lime kiln depicted on the emblem symbolizes the main Pustomyty craft for many years.

Until 18 July 2020, Pustomyty was the administrative center of Pustomyty Raion. The raion was abolished in July 2020 as part of the administrative reform of Ukraine, which reduced the number of raions of Lviv Oblast to seven. The area of Pustomyty Raion was merged into Lviv Raion.

== Gallery ==
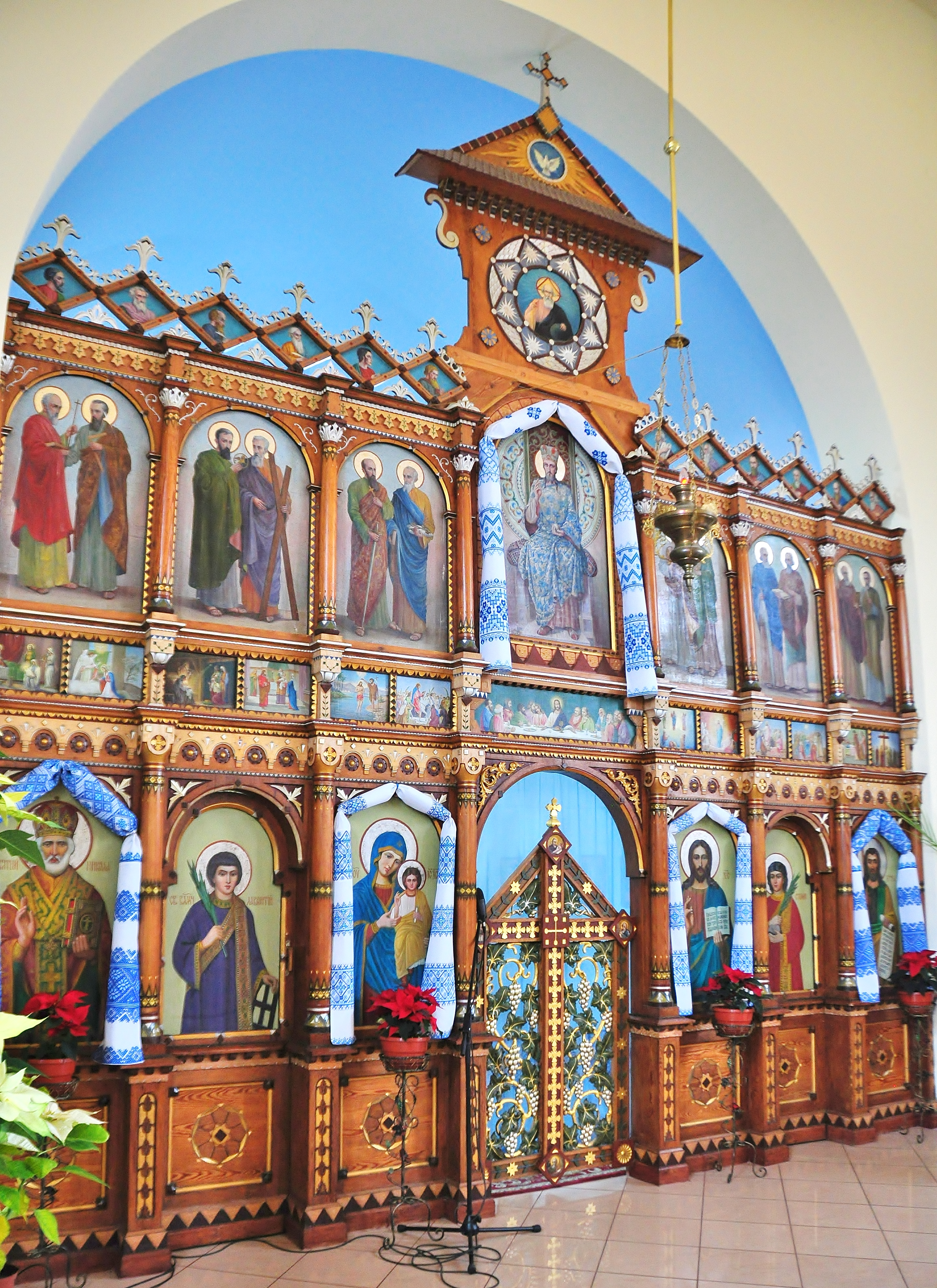
Iconostasis of the Saint Nicholas Church

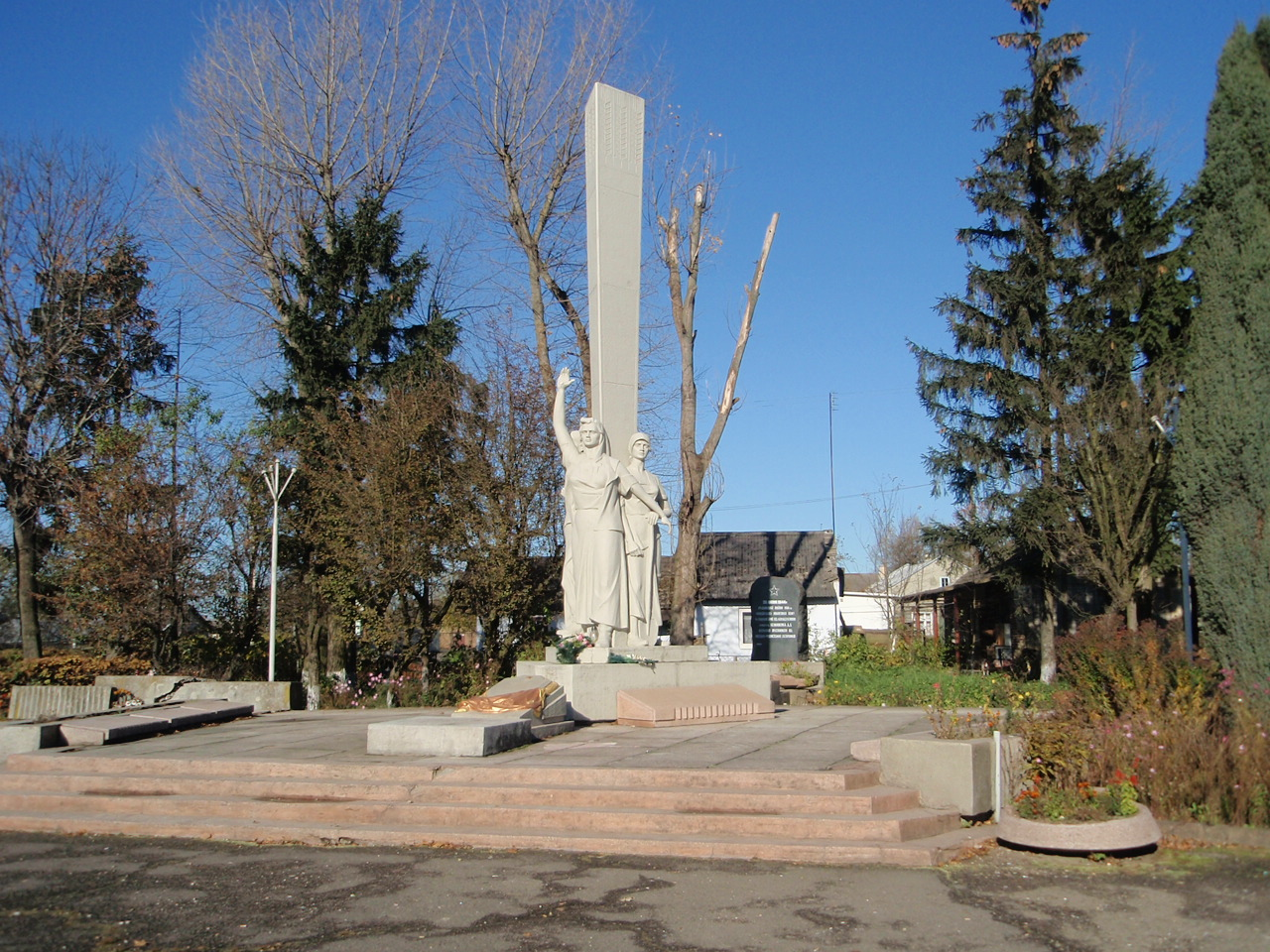
Soviet war monument

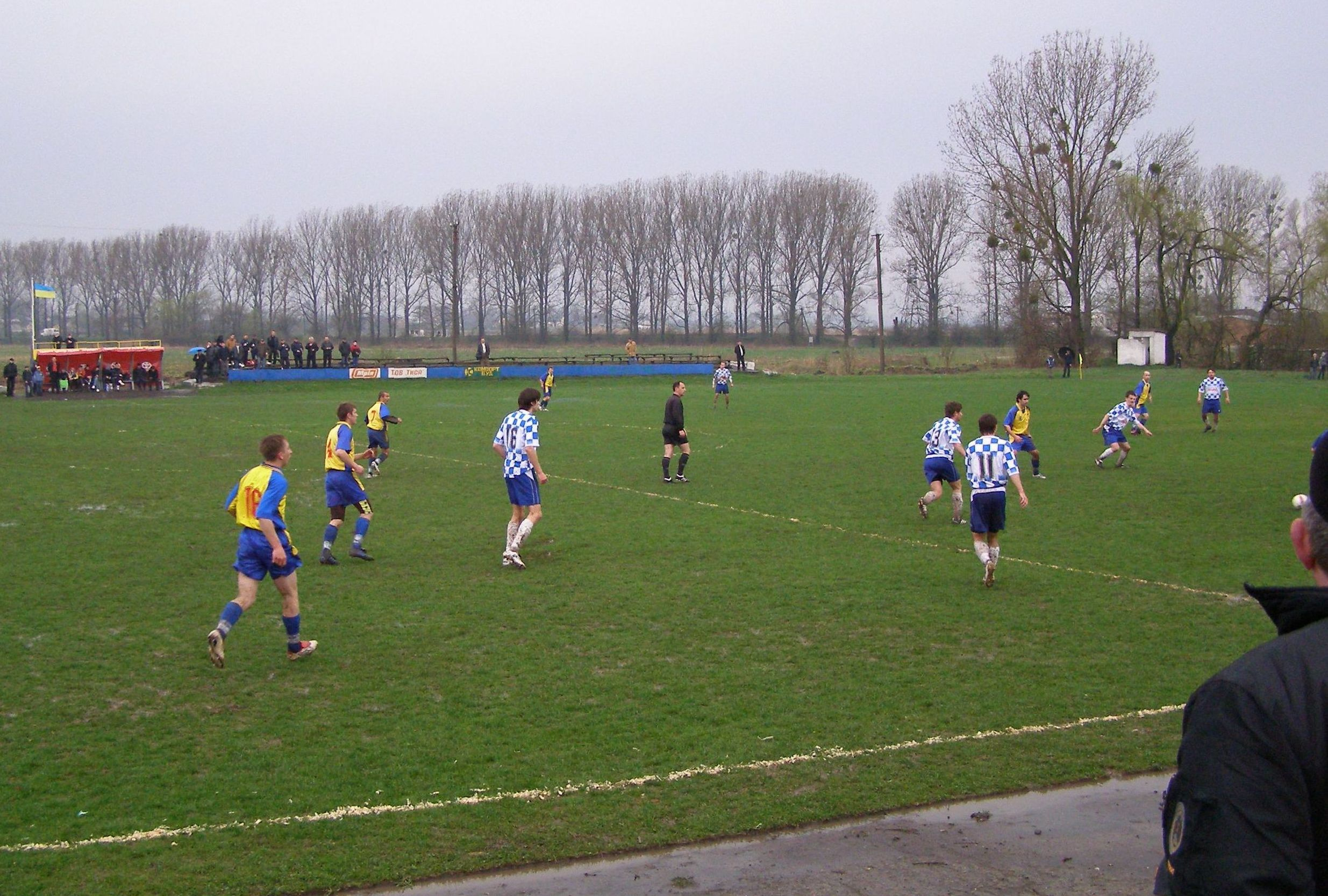
FC Pustomyty home match

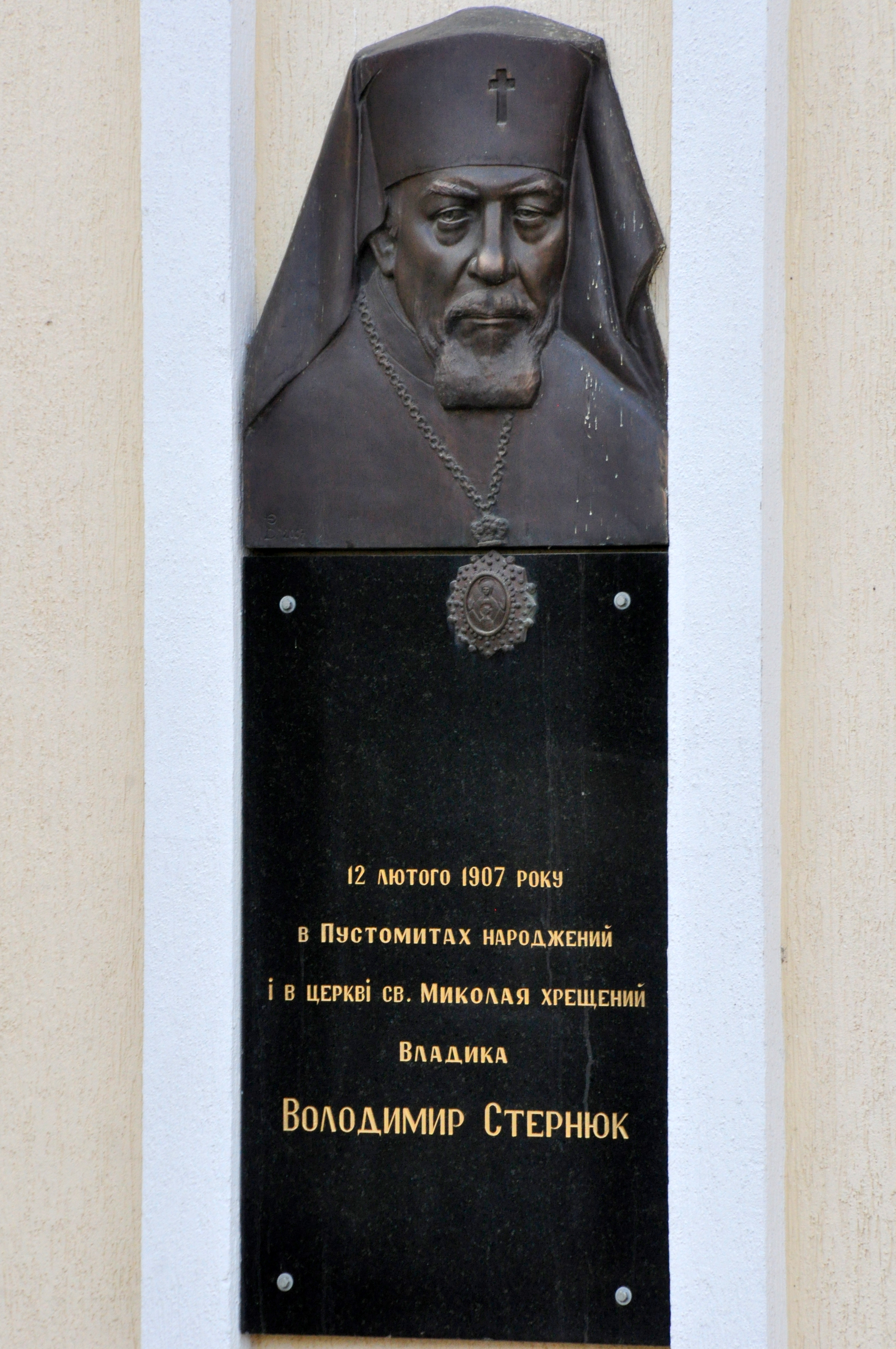
Sterniuk Pustomyty

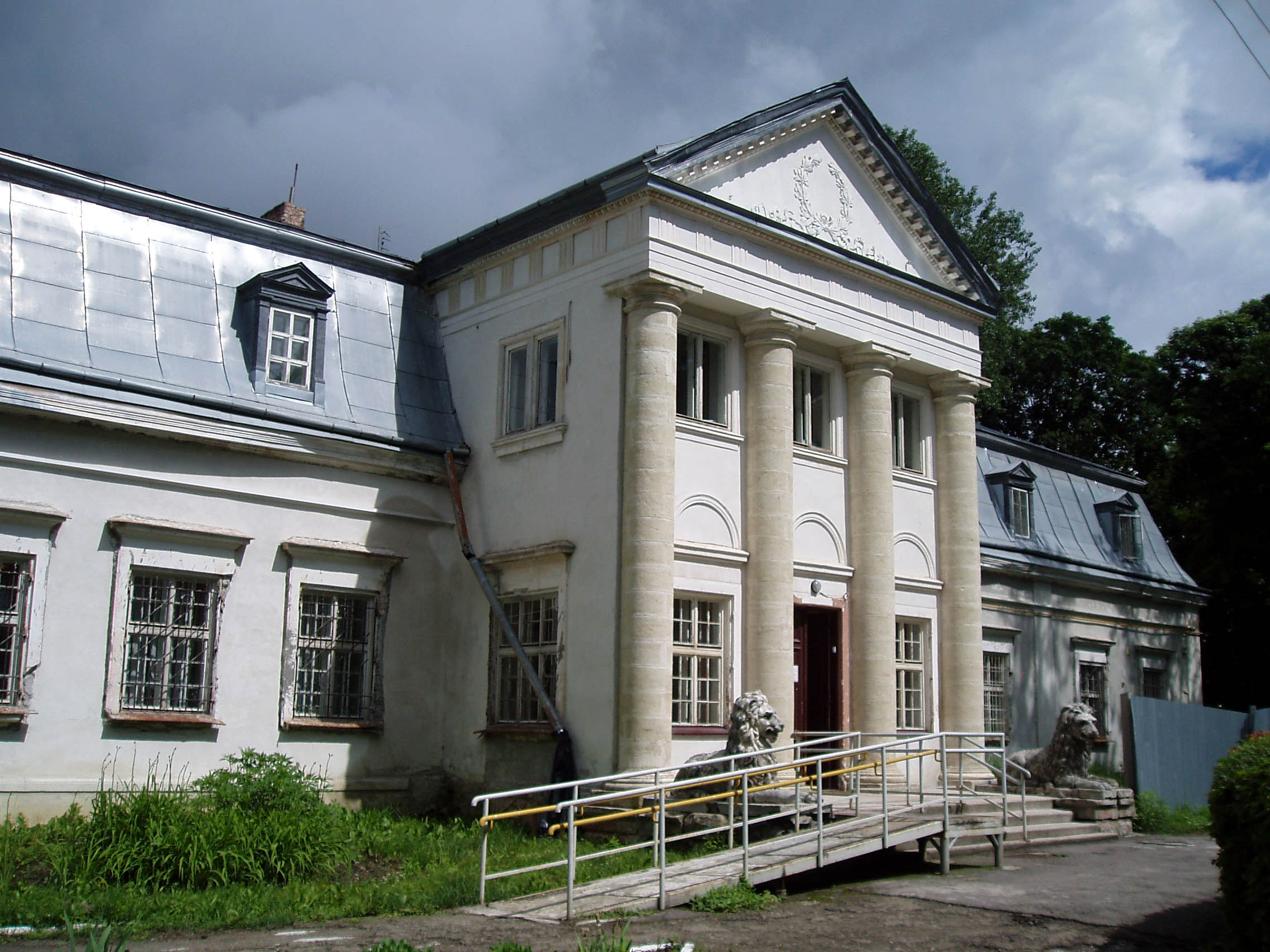
Hrushevskoho Street
