= Dniester Lowland =

Dniester Lowland (Ukrainian: Наддністрянська котловина) forms the northwesternmost part of Prykarpattia and is located in the upper flow of the Dniester between the Stryvihor river in the west and the mouth of Svicha river in the east. Its territory is represented by an alluvial plain with elevations of up to 300 meters. The slight gradient of the Dniester in the area results in the formation of large swamps, especially in the western part of the area near Sambir. This fact also results in frequent flooding. More than half of the lowland's area is covered with pastures and hayfields, and the territory of cultivated and forested lands is relatively small. The population density in the lowland reaches 60 inhabitants per square kilometer. May villages are located on elevated terraces, meanwhile major cities, including Sambir, Drohobych, Stryi, Rudky, Komarno and Mykolaiv lie on the edges of the plain.

== Gallery ==
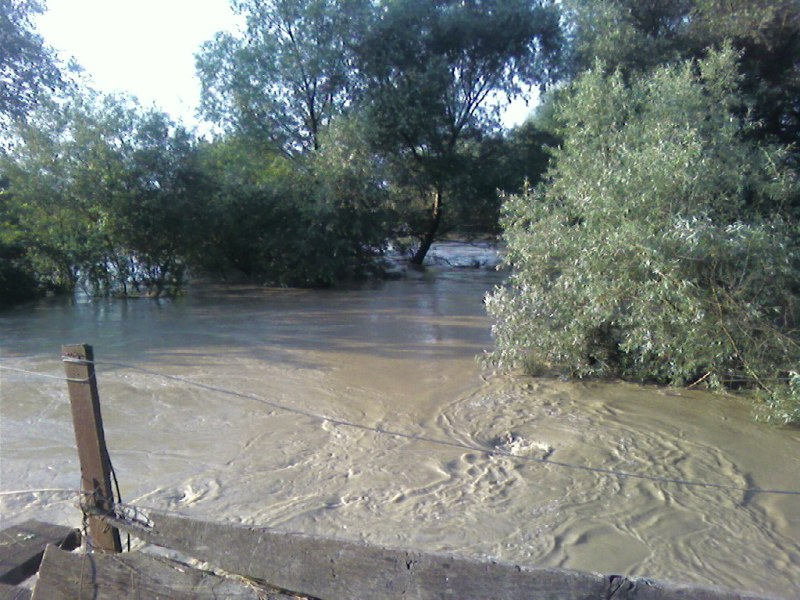
A scene from the 2008 Ukrainian floods on Stryvihor river

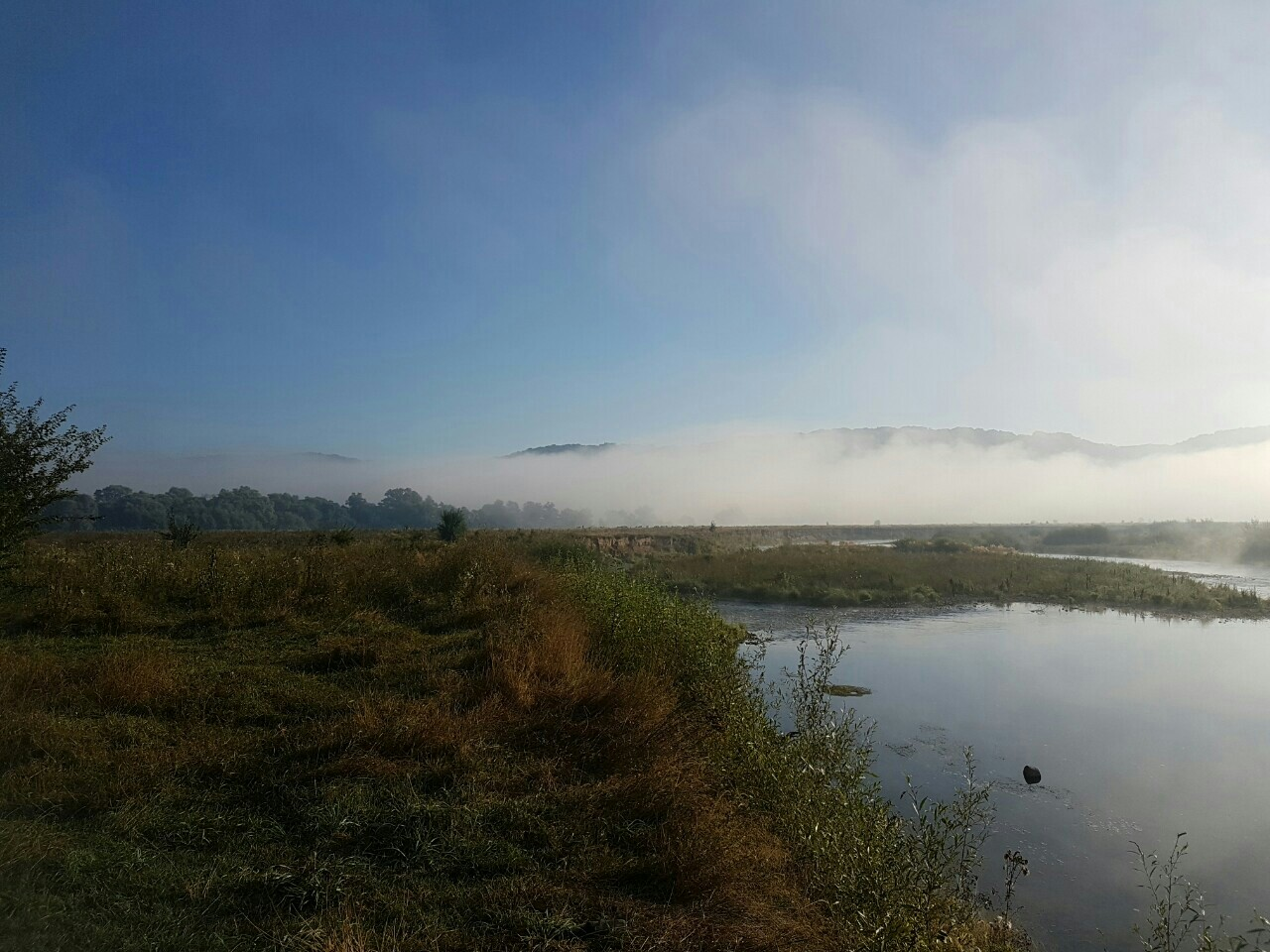
Svicha river near Zhuravno

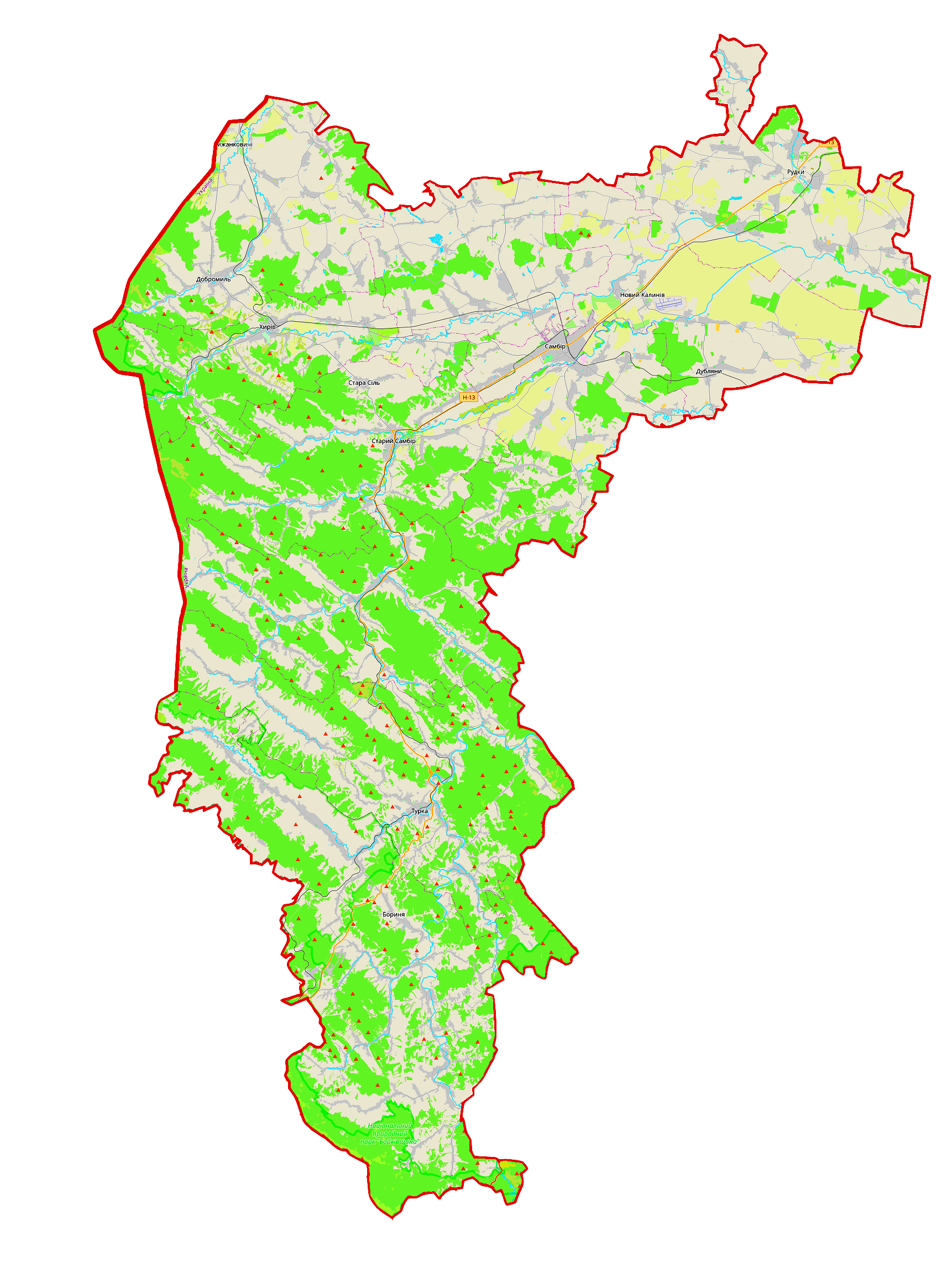
Map of Sambir Raion with part of the lowland visible in the northeast

== Sources ==
- Dniester Lowland in Encyclopedia of Ukraine
