= Battle of Komarno =

1672 battle

- Part of Polish-Ottoman War (1672–1676)
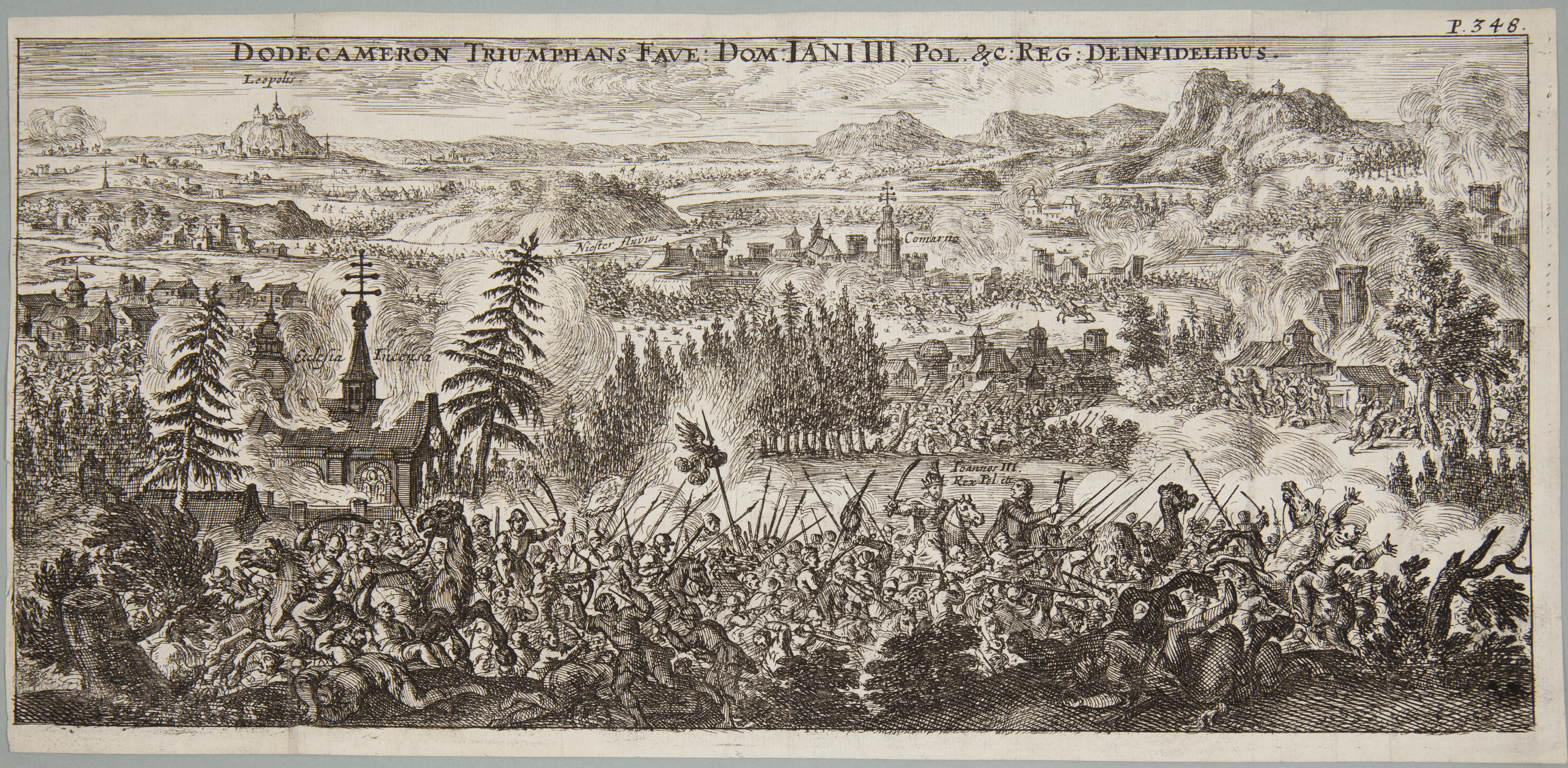
| Date | 9 October 1672 |
| Location | Komarno, Ukraine |
| Result | Polish-Lithuanian victory |

Belligerents
| Polish-Lithuanian Commonwealth | Crimean Khanate; Lipka Tatars; Cossack Hetmanate |

Commanders and leaders
| John III Sobieski | Nurredin-Sultan |

Strength
| 2,500 cavalry and dragoons | 10,000 Crimean Tatars; 400 Lipka Tatars; 400 Cossacks |

Casualties and losses
| Unknown | 9,300 |

The Battle of Komarno took place on October 9, 1672, during the Polish-Ottoman War (1672-1676). It was part of Jan III Sobieski’s autumn expedition, aimed at destruction of mounted Tatar units, which plundered southeastern provinces of the Polish–Lithuanian Commonwealth.

== Battle ==
After the Battle of Niemirow, Crown Hetman Jan Sobieski headed towards Grodek Jagiellonski, with some 2,500-3,000 cavalry and dragoons. When his unit reached the area of Jaworow, Sobieski realized that main Crimean Tatar forces advanced towards Przemysl and then southwards to Sambir. Polish hetman decided to stop their retreat, and after a skirmish at the village of Hoszany, Tatar prisoners told the Poles that a 10,000 strong army under Noradin-Soltan camped in a valley near the town of Komarno. The Tatars were supported by the Cossacks of Petro Doroshenko.

Sobieski wanted to surprise the enemy, ordering his soldiers to march 57 kilometers in a heavy rain and along muddy roads. His plan for the battle was to carry out a mock attack in the center of the Tatar-Cossack camp, and then to use his main forces to attack the left wing, in order to keep the Tatars away from the Wereszyca river crossing. Polish forces were divided into two groups - a 1,000-strong unit under Stefan Bidzinski, and a 1,500-strong unit with the hussars under Sobieski.

At app. 4 p.m. the Tatars noticed the group of Bidzinski and mounted an attack, using their main forces. Soon afterwards, the hussars of Sobieski attacked their left wing, which resulted in a Tatar retreat towards the river. Those enemy soldiers who tried to cross the Wereszyca were killed, while other Tatars managed to flee towards Rudki. The slaughter of the invaders continued until nighttime, and only 1,500 Tatars managed to cross the Dniester, and return to their homeland. Sobieski’s forces also freed some 20,000 civilians, captured by the hordes.

== Gallery ==
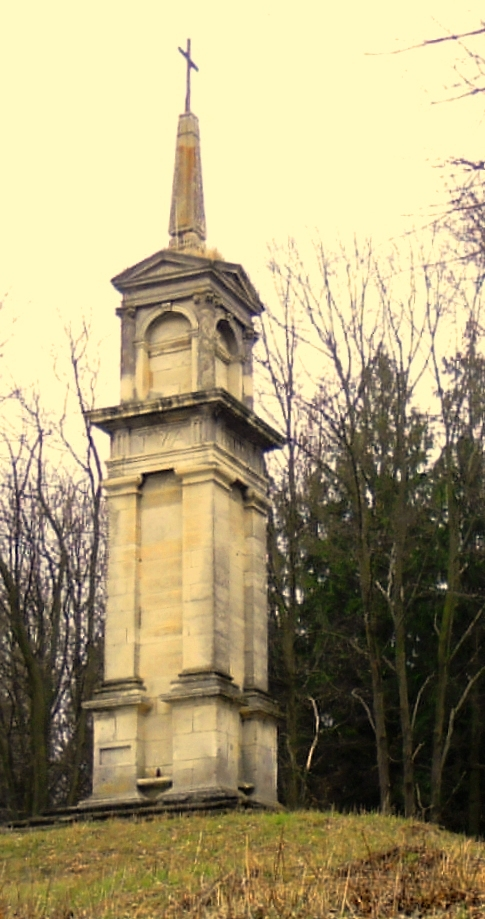
Monument to victims of the Tatar raids 17th century. Komarno.

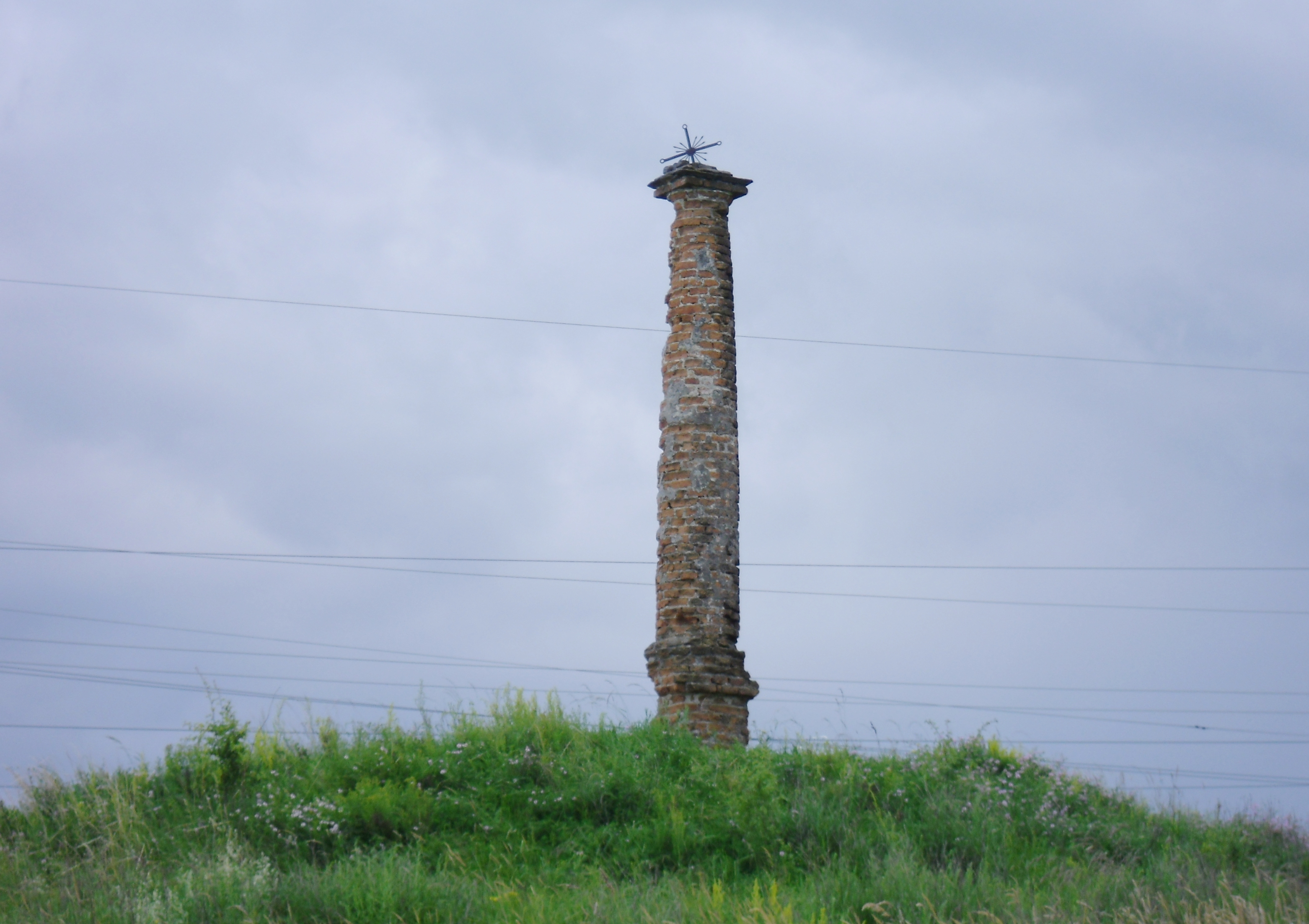
Monument to victims of the Polish-Turkish war (1672–76) near village Hradivka

== Sources ==
- Mala Encyklopedia Wojskowa, Wydawnictwo Ministerstwa Obrony Narodowej, Warszawa 1967, Wydanie I, Tom 2
- Mista UA Komarno (in Ukrainian)
