= Komarno urban hromada =

Hromada in Lviv Oblast, Ukraine

Komarno urban hromada Комарнівська міська громада
- Hromada
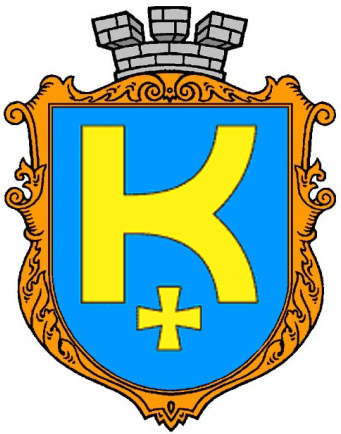
- Seal
- Interactive map of Komarno urban hromada
- Country: Ukraine
- Oblast: Lviv Oblast
- Raion: Lviv Raion
- Admin. center: Komarno

Area
  - Total: 1,869 km^{2} (722 sq mi)

Population (2021)
  - Total: 13,779
  - Density: 7.372/km^{2} (19.09/sq mi)
- CATOTTG code: UA46060210000047788
- Settlements: 22
- Cities: 1
- Villages: 21
- Website: komrada.gov.ua

Komarno urban hromada (Ukrainian: Комарнівська міська громада) is a hromada in Ukraine, in Lviv Raion of Lviv Oblast. The administrative center is the city of Komarno.

The administrative center is the city of Komarno, Ukraine.

The area of the community is 186.9 km^{2}, and the population was 13,779 in 2021.

== Settlements ==
The hromada consists of 1 city (Komarno) and 21 villages:

- Andriianiv
- Berezets
- Buchaly
- Hrabyne
- Hrimne
- Zabolottia
- Katerynychi
- Klitsko
- Lytovka
- Livchytsi
- Monastyrets
- Mosty
- Nove Selo
- Palanyky
- Peremozhne
- Pidzvirynets
- Poliana
- Tataryniv
- Tershakiv
- Tulyholove
- Yakymchytsi
