= Julian Fałat =

Polish painter (1853–1929)

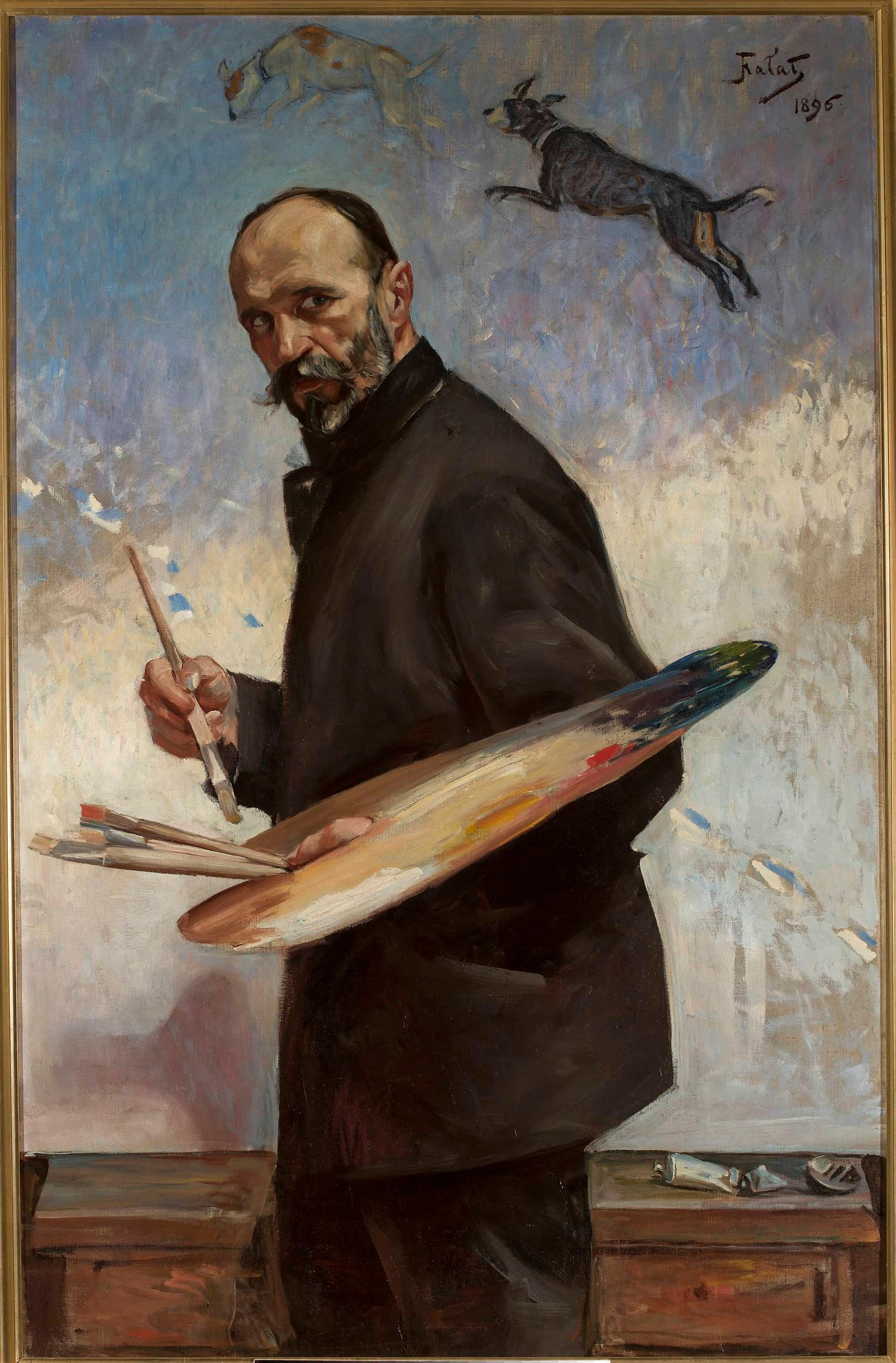
Self-portrait, 1896, National Museum in Warsaw

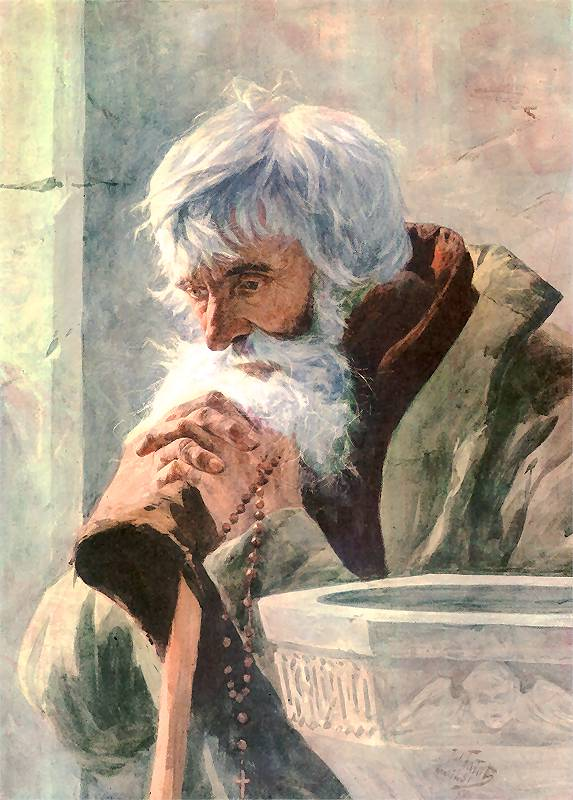
Old man praying, 1881, National Museum in Warsaw

Julian Fałat (Tuligłowy, near Lwów, 30 July 1853 – 9 July 1929, Bystra Śląska) was one of the most prolific Polish watercolorists, one of the country's foremost landscapists, and a leading impressionist.

== Life ==
Fałat studied at the Kraków School of Fine Arts under Władysław Łuszczkiewicz, then at the Art Academy of Munich. In the course of his 1885 travels about Europe and Asia, Fałat compiled studies which were conducive to the development of his art. Themes typical of his painting are Polish landscapes, hunting scenes, portraits, and travel observations.

He accepted an invitation from future German Emperor Wilhelm II to serve as court painter in Berlin and worked there 1886-1895.

In 1895 he became director of the Kraków School of Fine Arts. In 1900 he reorganized it as the Kraków Academy of Fine Arts.

Fałat died in Bystra Śląska on 9 July 1929. A Polish museum, the Fałatówka, is devoted to him.

Works looted under Germany's World War II occupation of Poland occasionally appear in sales rooms. In December 2010, The Hunt and Off to the Hunt were seized by U.S. authorities from New York City auction houses. They are to be repatriated to Poland's National Museum of Art in Warsaw.

Fałat declared: "Polish art ought to convey our history and beliefs, our good qualities and our defects; it must be the quintessence of our soil, our sky, our ideals."

Of Julian Fałat's three children, Kazimierz ("Togo", 1904–1981) also painted watercolors. Some of his works, produced in the same style after he settled in England (1947–), are largely in the hands of family.

== See also ==
- Academy of Fine Arts in Kraków
- Bielsko-Biała Museum
- Culture of Kraków
- List of Poles
- Young Poland

== Bibliography ==
Maciej Masłowski: Julian Fałat, Warsaw 1964, ed. "Arkady".
