= Tulyholove =

Rural locality in Lviv Oblast, Ukraine

Tulyholove Тулиголове
- Village
- Location within Ukraine
- Coordinates: 49°30′36″N 23°38′24″E
- Country: Ukraine
- Oblast: Lviv Oblast
- Raion: Lviv Raion
- First mentioned: 1524

Area
  - Total: 2.85 km^{2} (1.10 sq mi)

Population
  - Total: 600
  - Density: 225.96/km^{2} (585.2/sq mi)
- Time zone: UTC+2 (EET)
  - Summer (DST): UTC+3 (EEST)
- Postal code: 81572
- Area code: +380 3231

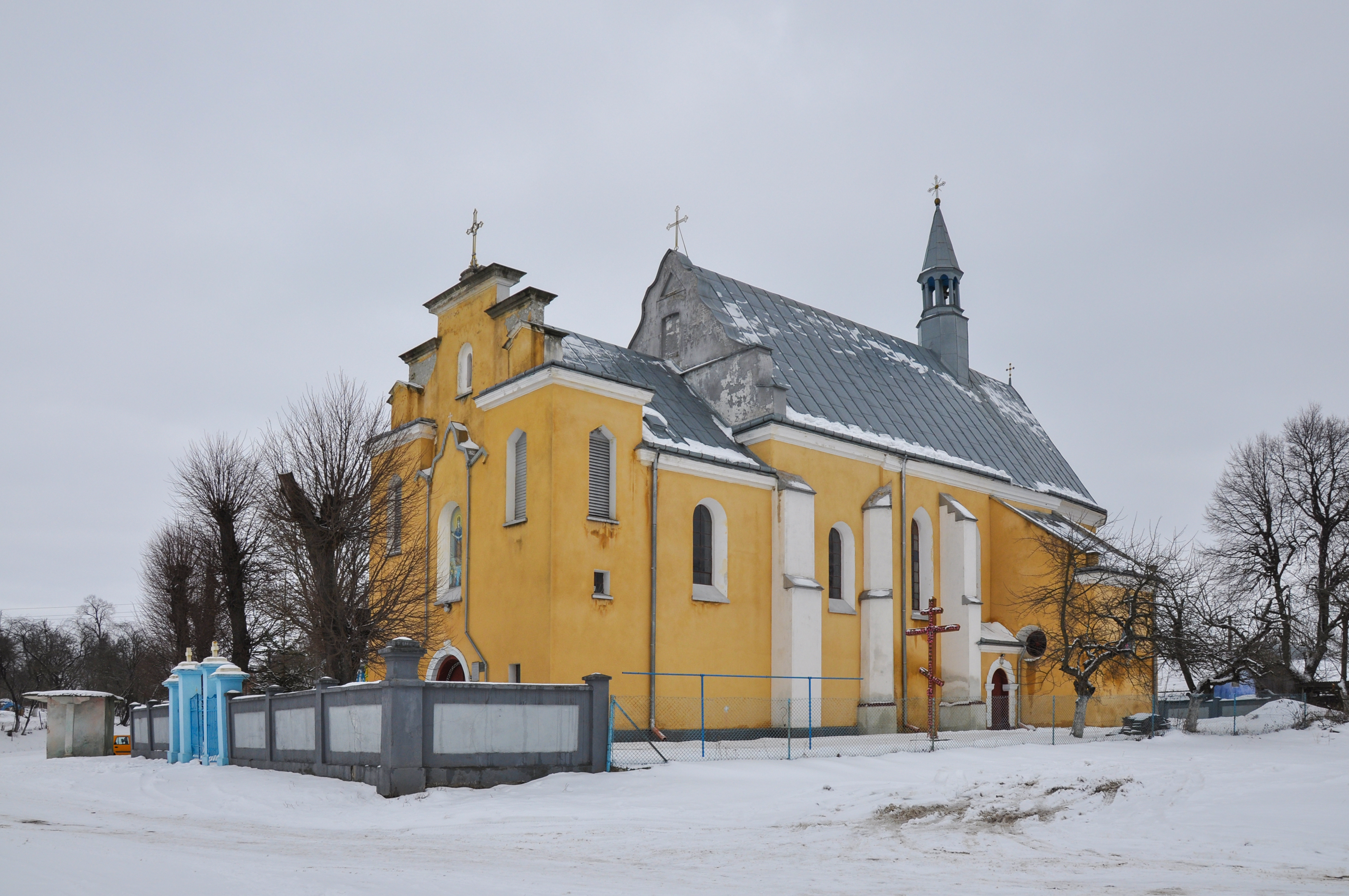
Tulyholove Catholic Church

Tulyholove (Ukrainian: Тулиголове; Polish: Tuligłowy) is a village in Lviv Raion (district) of Lviv Oblast (province) of western Ukraine. It belongs to Komarno urban hromada, one of the hromadas of Ukraine.

Until 18 July 2020, Tulyholove belonged to Horodok Raion. The raion was abolished in July 2020, as part of the administrative reform of Ukraine, which reduced the number of raions of Lviv Oblast to seven. The area of Horodok Raion was merged into Lviv Raion.

== Population ==
Tulyholove's total population is 600.

== People ==
- Julian Fałat, Polish painter born in Tuligłowy
