= Buchaly =

Rural locality in Lviv Oblast, Ukraine

Buchaly Бучали
- Village
- Location within Lviv Oblast
- Coordinates: 49°39′08″N 23°40′42″E
- Country: Ukraine
- Oblast: Lviv Oblast
- District: Lviv Raion
- Established: 1604

Area
  - Total: 107 km^{2} (41 sq mi)
- Elevation /(average value of): 265 m (869 ft)

Population
  - Total: 1,304
  - Density: 12.2/km^{2} (31.6/sq mi)
- Time zone: UTC+2 (EET)
  - Summer (DST): UTC+3 (EEST)
- Postal code: 81560
- Area code: +380 3231
- Website: село Бучали / райцентр Городок / облцентр Львів ^{(Ukrainian)}

Buchaly (Ukrainian: Буча́ли, Polish: Buczały) is a village (selo) in Lviv Raion, Lviv Oblast of Western Ukraine. It belongs to Horodok urban hromada, one of the hromadas of Ukraine. The population of the village is just about 1,304 people and the local government is administered by Buchalivska village council.

== Geography ==
The village is located at a distance of 4 kilometres (2.5 mi) from Komarno, 17 kilometres (11 mi) from Horodok and 42 kilometres (26 mi) from the regional center of Lviv. Through the village passes railway from Lviv to Sambir.

== History ==
For the first time the village mentioned in historical documents in the early 16th century. But the date of establishment the village is considered 1604.

In 1772, as a result of the First Partition of Poland, it came under the rule of the Austrian Empire.

From 1772 to 1918, the village was part of the autonomous Kingdom of Galicia and Lodomeria.

From November 1918, it became part of the Western Ukrainian People's Republic.

From 1920 the town administratively belonged to Rudka County in Lviv Voivodeship Second Polish Republic, from 1934 to Komarno County.

In September 1939, units of the Red Army entered. This entire area was incorporated into the Ukrainian Soviet Socialist Republic.

Since the outbreak of the Third Reich-Union of Soviet Socialist Republics war (July 1941), the village was occupied by German troops and then incorporated into the General Government.

During the German occupation of Poland in Buchaly, which was purely Polish, there was a strong self-defense force, which prevented attacks on the village. Later Extermination battalion (Russian: истребительные батальоны) was stationed here. In 1944–1945, Ukrainian nationalists from the OUN - UPA brutally murdered four Poles here, as a part of considered as a genocide Massacres of Poles in Volhynia and Eastern Galicia.

In 1944, units of the Red Army re-entered. In 1945, mass deportations of Poles began in the village.

Since 1991, Buchaly has been within the territory of Ukraine.

Until 18 July 2020, Buchaly belonged to Horodok Raion. The raion was abolished in July 2020 as part of the administrative reform of Ukraine, which reduced the number of raions of Lviv Oblast to seven. The area of Horodok Raion was merged into Lviv Raion.

== People ==
- Stanisław Cygan (born 1944), Polish footballer playing as a defender, coach.
- Antoni Maziak, Polish resident of the village, hid Jews on his farm, for which in 1994 the Yad Vashem Institute honored him with the title of Righteous Among the Nations.
- Mieczysław Pater (1927–2017), Polish historian, professor University of Wrocław was born in the town.

== Cult constructions and religion ==
In the village there are two religious communities. This religious community of the Ukrainian Greek Catholic Church and Religious Community of the Ukrainian Autocephalous Orthodox Church.
There are two churches for the needs of religious communities:

- Church of the Holy Trinity (UGCC).
- Church of St. Archangel Gabriel (UAPC).

== Gallery ==
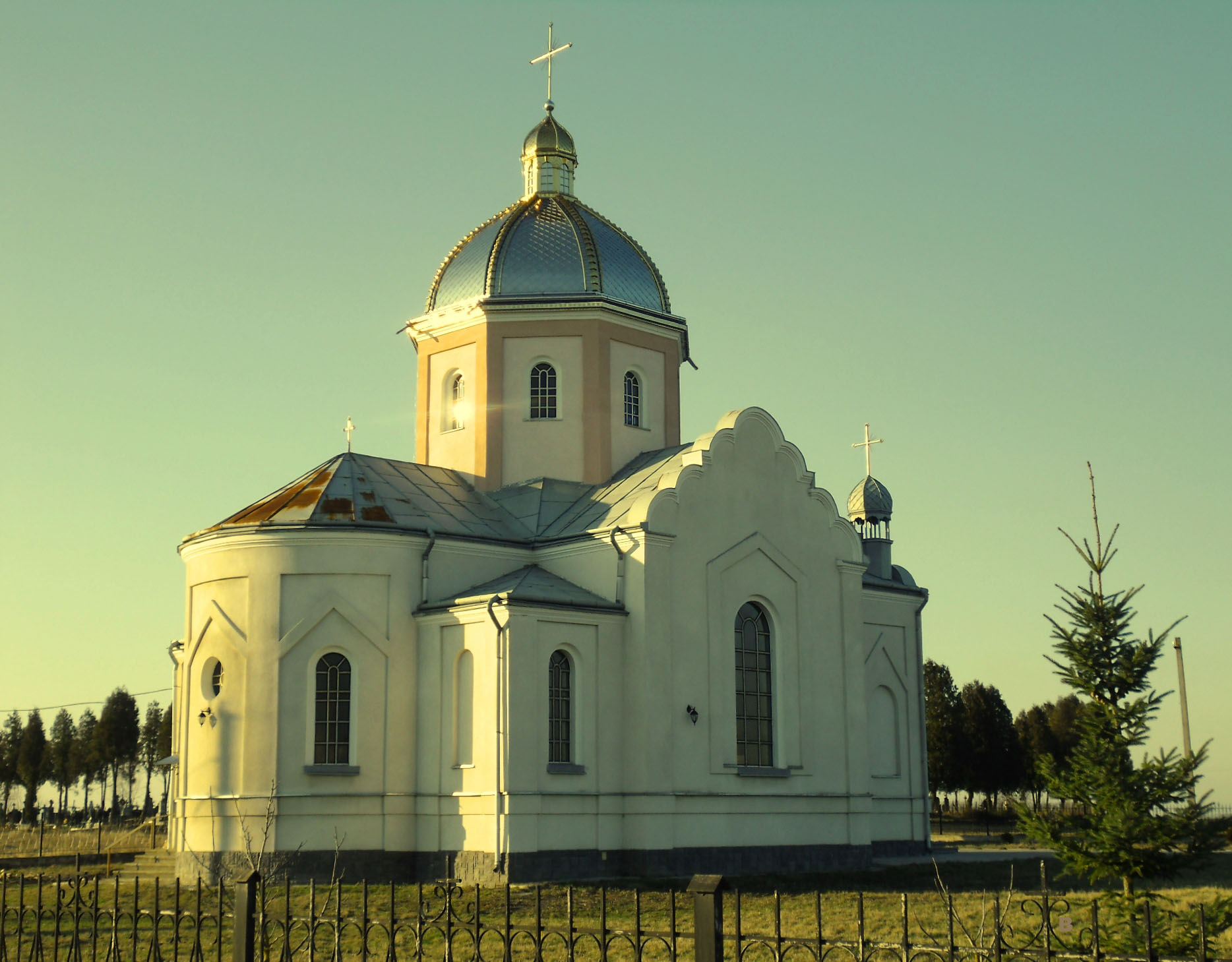
Church of the Holy Trinity (UGCC). Buchaly

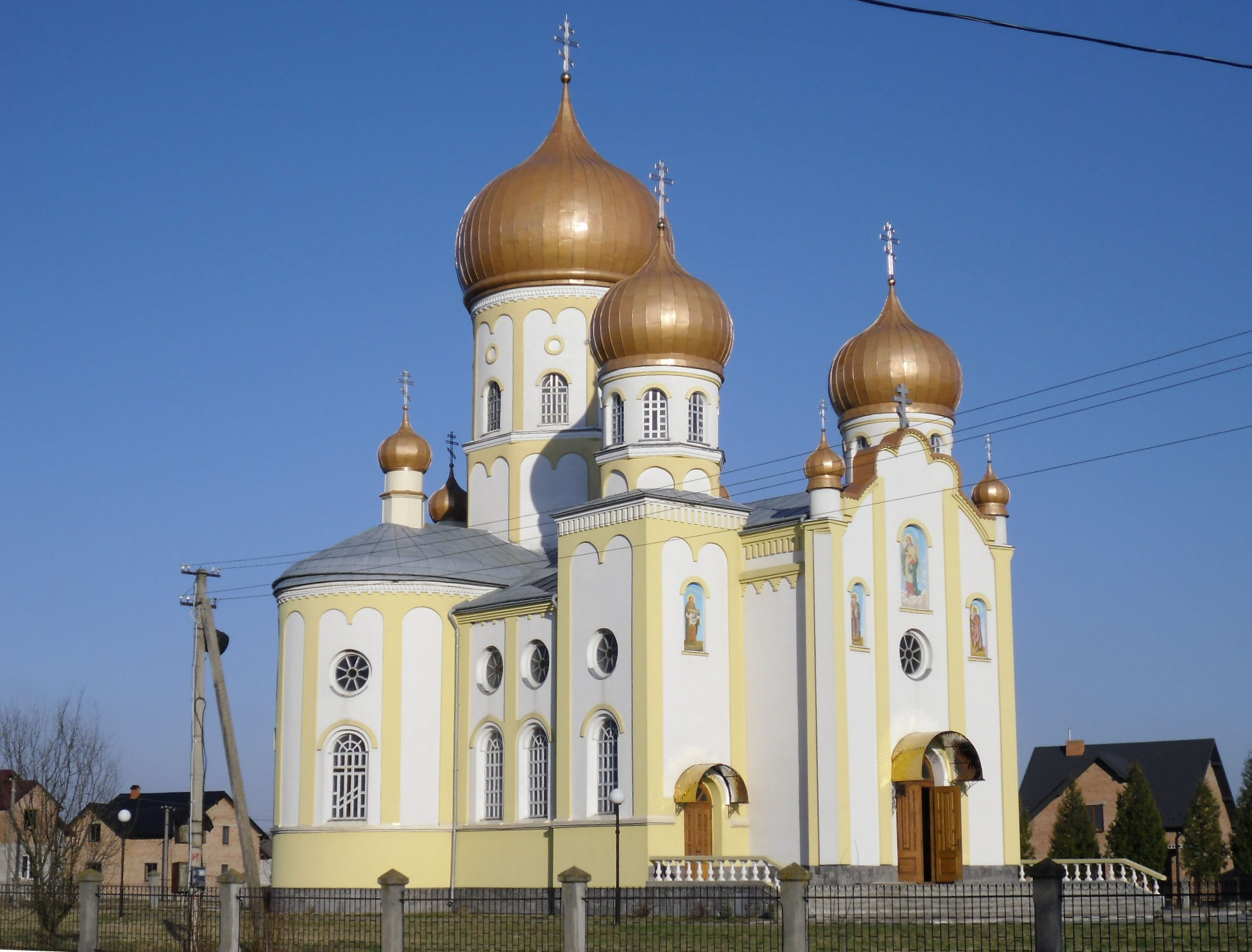
Church of St. Archangel Gabriel (UAPC). Buchaly

== Literature ==
- Історія міст і сіл УРСР : Львівська область, Бучали. – К. : ГРУРЕ, 1968 р. Page 257 (in Ukrainian)
