= Hayfield =

Hayfield may refer to:

- A field used to grow grasses for hay

== Places ==
- Hayfield, Alberta, Canada

United Kingdom

- Hayfield, Derbyshire, a village and civil parish in Derbyshire, England
- Hayfield, Fife, a location in Scotland
- Hayfield Road, Oxford, England

United States

- Hayfield, Iowa, an unincorporated community
- Hayfield Junction, Iowa, an unincorporated community
- Hayfield, Minnesota, a city in Dodge County
- Hayfield, Fairfax County, Virginia
- Hayfield, Frederick County, Virginia
- Hayfield Dundee, Louisville, a neighborhood in eastern Louisville, Kentucky
- Hayfield Secondary School, the oldest secondary school in the Fairfax County Public Schools system of Virginia
- Hayfield Township, Crawford County, Pennsylvania
- Hayfield Township, Dodge County, Minnesota

== People with the surname ==
- Andrew Osborne Hayfield (1905–1981), American businessman and politician
- Matt Hayfield (born 1975), English footballer
- Nancy Hayfield, American author, editor and publisher

== Others ==
- The Hayfield Fight, an 1867 engagement of Red Cloud's War, between troops of the U.S. Army and Native American warriors
- Hemizonia congesta, a species of flowering plant in the daisy family commonly known by the name hayfield tarweed
- Heyfield, Victoria, Australia
