= Komarno, Ukraine =

City in Lviv Oblast, Ukraine

Komarno Комарно קאָמאַרנע
- City
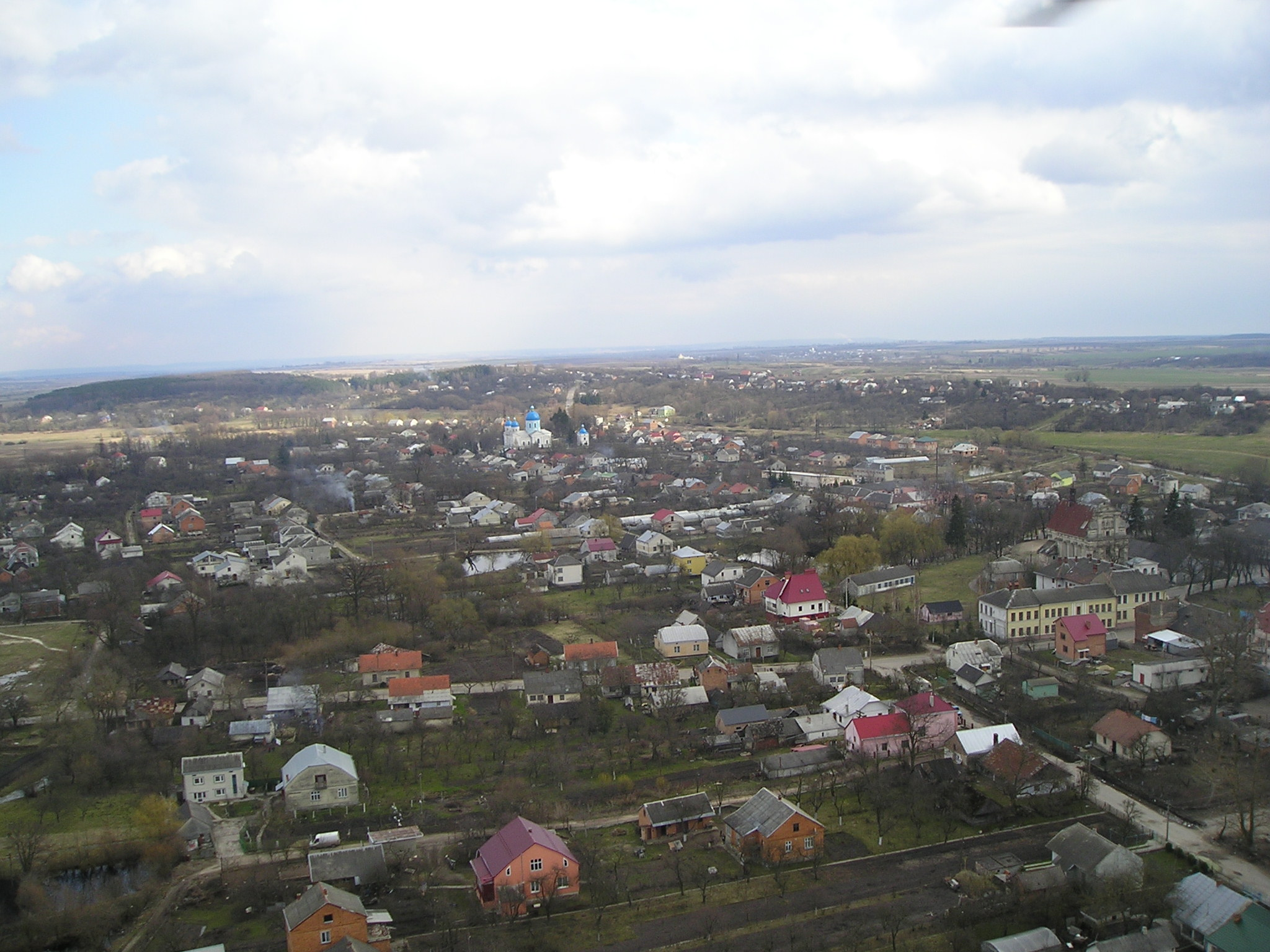
- View of Komarno

- Flag Coat of arms

- Location within Lviv Oblast Location within Ukraine
- Coordinates: 49°37′50″N 23°42′11″E
- Country: Ukraine
- Province: Lviv Oblast
- District: Lviv Raion
- Hromada: Komarno urban hromada
- Established: 1471

Area
  - Total: 10.67 km^{2} (4.12 sq mi)
- Elevation: 263 m (863 ft)

Population (2022)
  - Total: 3,653
  - Density: 342.4/km^{2} (886.7/sq mi)
- Time zone: UTC+2 (EET)
  - Summer (DST): UTC+3 (EEST)
- Postal code: 81562, 81563
- Area code: +380 3231
- Website: місто Комарно (in Ukrainian)

Komarno (Ukrainian: Комарно [koˈmɑrno]; Polish: Komarno; Yiddish: קאָמאַרנע) is a city located in Lviv Raion (district) of Lviv Oblast (region) in western Ukraine. Local government is administered by Komarno City Council. It hosts the administration of Komarno urban hromada, one of the hromadas of Ukraine. The population is approximately 3,653 (2022 estimate).

== Geography ==
Komarno lies upon the Vereshchytsia river in Dniester Lowland.

== History ==
Emerged during the 12th and 13th centuries, the village of Komarno was first mentioned in 1427. In 1471, Komarno got the Magdeburg rights. In the center of town is an old Polish Kostel (Catholic Church), as well as an old wooden Ukrainian Orthodox church complete with ancient icons. The river Vereshytsia flows through the town.

The Jewish Hasidic dynasty of Komarno originates from this town, and there was a sizable Jewish community in the town from the 16th century until World War II when they were murdered.

Komarno, which until the Partitions of Poland belonged to Ruthenian Voivodeship, received its town charter (Magdeburg rights) in 1471 from King Kazimierz Jagiellonczyk. The town was under protection of Voivode Stanislaw de Chodecz, who in 1473 founded here a Roman Catholic church. Komarno was a local center of textile industry. The town was divided into several districts, and remained in private hands of several voivodes. In 1590, it belonged to Jan Ostrorog, the voivode of Poznań, and in the 17th century, it was property of the House of Wiśniowiecki. Later on, Komarno belonged to the Ogiński family, and Lanckoroński family. In the 19th century, when it already was part of Austrian Galicia, the Lanckoroński family built here a palace. The last owner of Komarno was Countess Karolina Lanckorońska.

In 1648, during the Khmelnytsky Uprising, Komarno was besieged by the Cossack-Tatar forces. On 8 October 1672 the Battle of Komarno took place here, in which King Jan III Sobieski destroyed a 10,000 strong Tatar unit.

In 1918, Komarno returned to Poland, and by 1939, its population was approximately 5,000. Until the Invasion of Poland, the town belonged to Lwów Voivodeship.

Prior to World War II, the town had a Jewish population of about 2,400. During World War II, the Jewish population was murdered in the town by Germans and their Ukrainian auxiliaries or sent to Belzec to be murdered there. Only a handful of Komarno's Jews survived the Holocaust.

Komarno has a former Roman Catholic church (1658), which in 1946 was turned by Soviet authorities into a warehouse. In 1992, Ukrainian government returned the complex to the faithful, but soon afterwards, it was handed over to the local Greek-Catholic community. Among people associated with Komarno are Jan Kilarski (mathematician), Countess Karolina Lanckoronska, linguist Roman Laskowski, historian Jozef Leszczynski, and writer Karol Szajnocha.

Until 18 July 2020, Komarno belonged to Horodok Raion. The raion was abolished in July 2020 as part of the administrative reform of Ukraine, which reduced the number of raions of Lviv Oblast to seven. The area of Horodok Raion was merged into Lviv Raion.

== Points of interest ==
The wooden St. Michael's Church in Komarno was built in 1754 (according to other data, in 1661) and contains valuable frescoes.

== Gallery ==
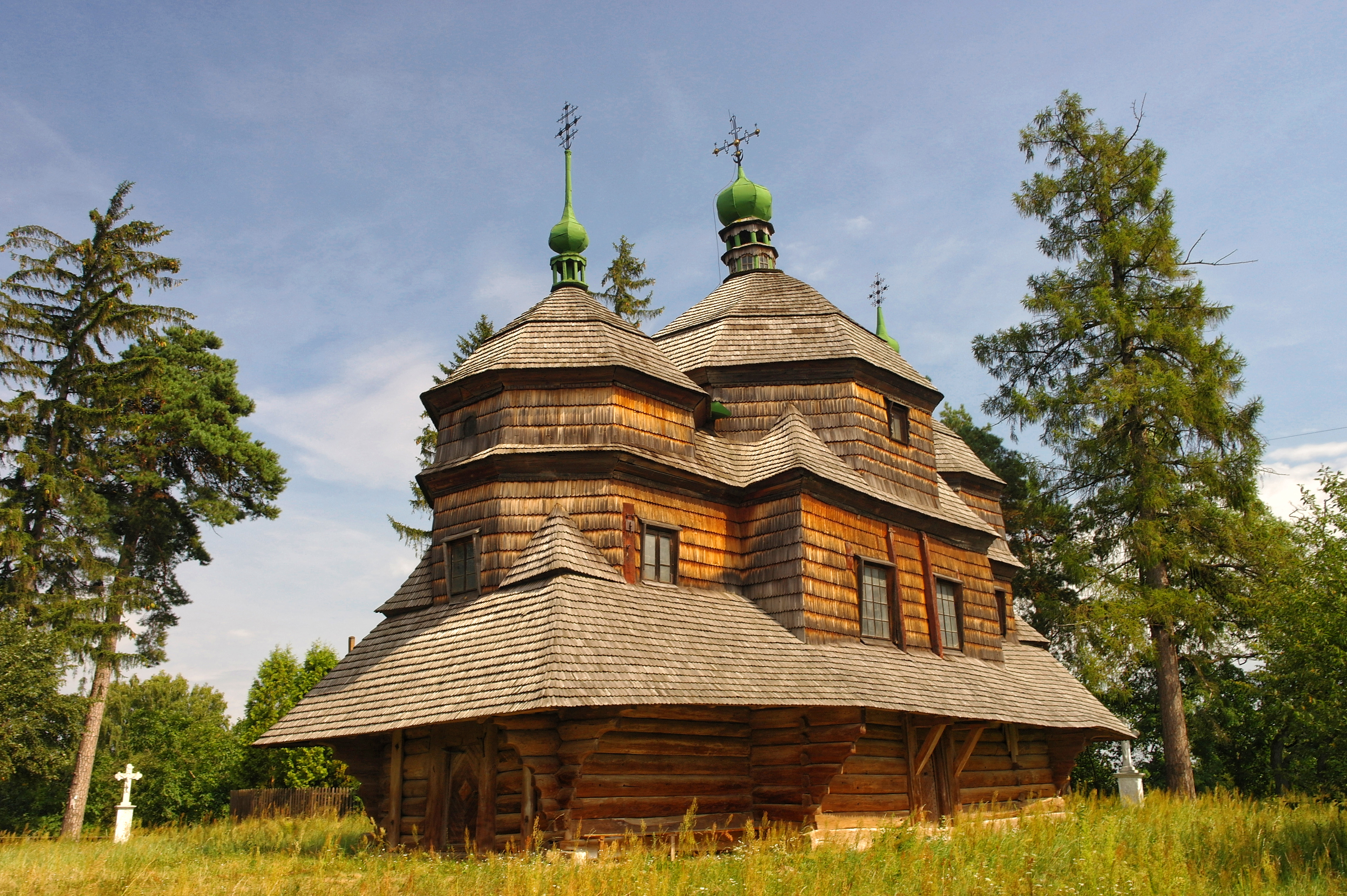
Wooden church of Saint Michael, built in 1754

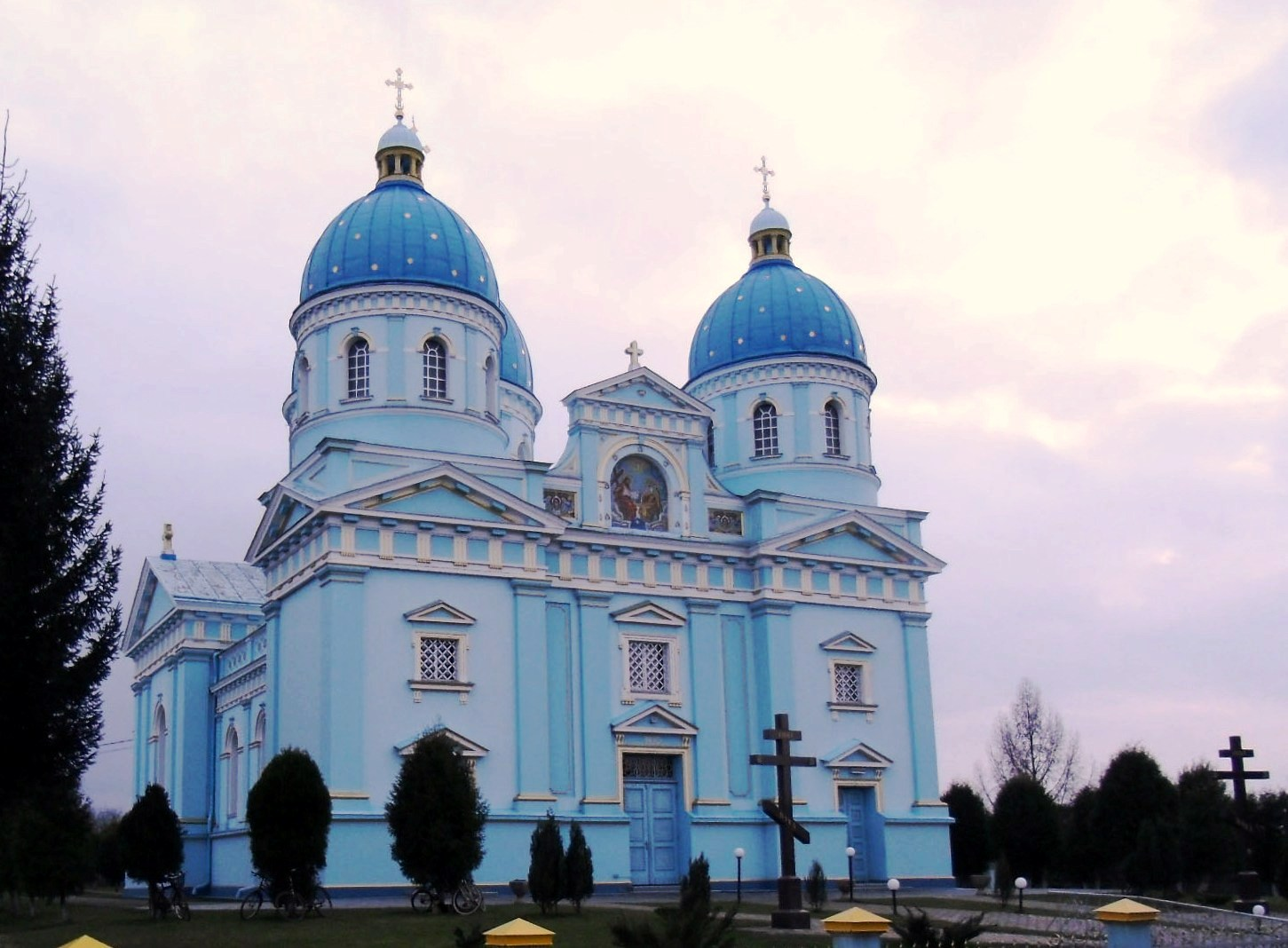
Church of St. Michael the Archangel (stone)

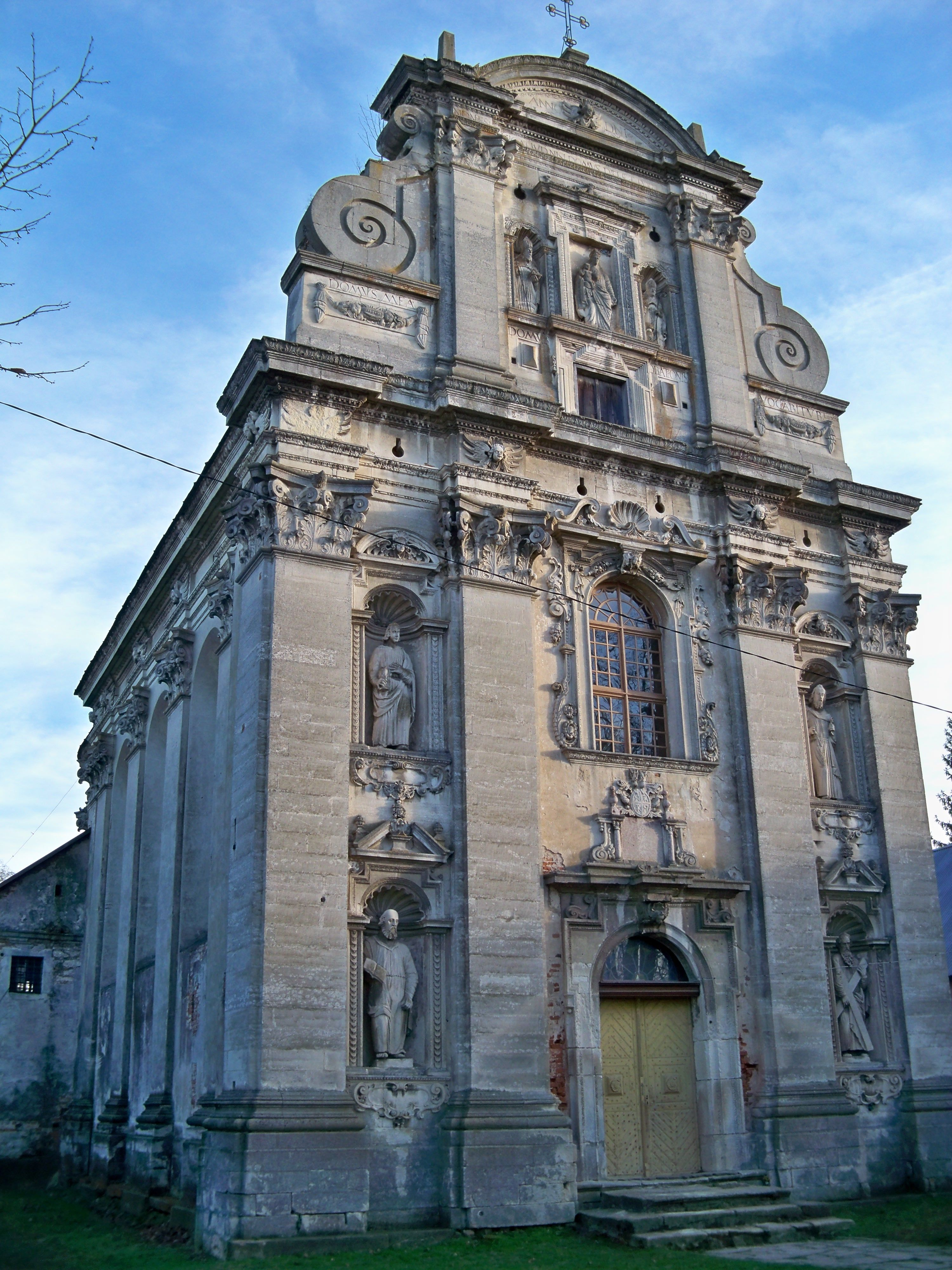
Roman Catholic Church of Nativity of the Blessed Virgin Mary

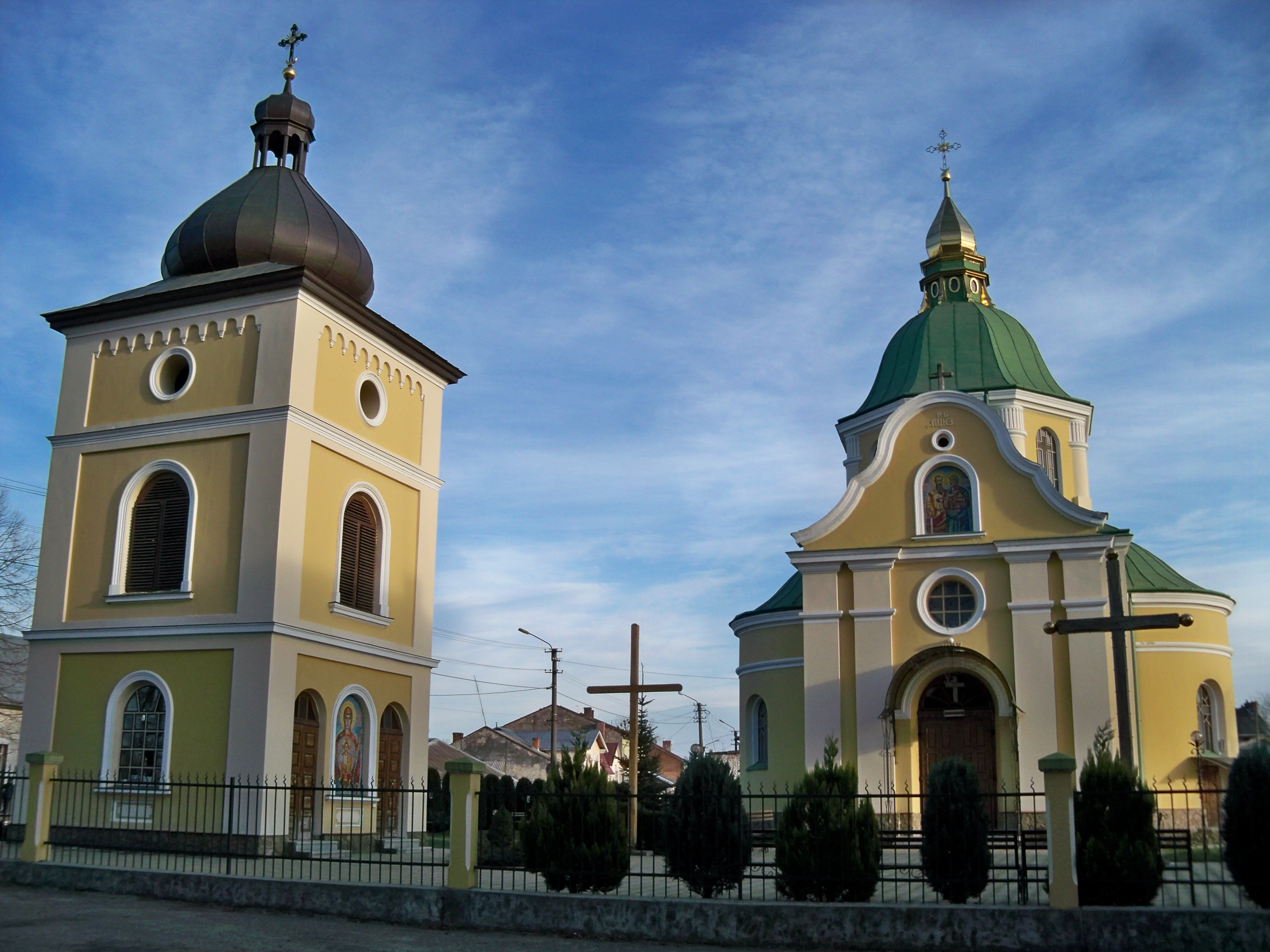
Church of Saints Apostles Peter and Paul

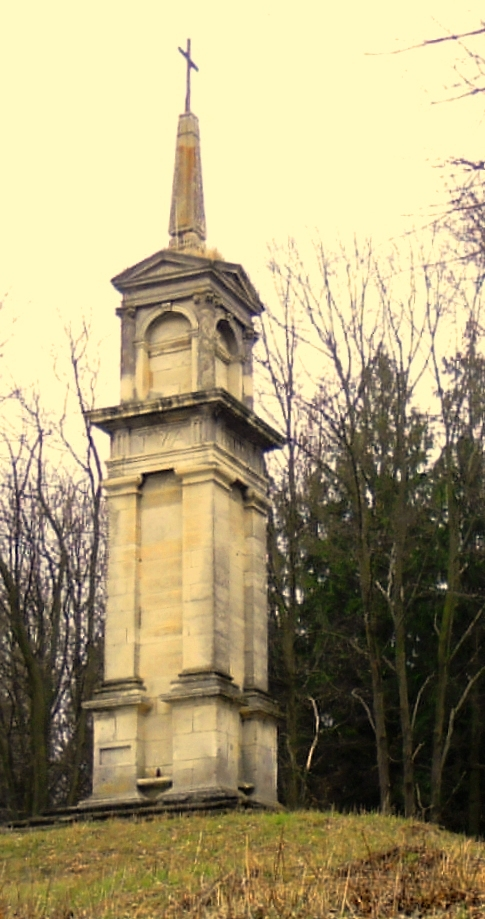
Monument to victims of the Tatar raids 17th century
