= Hradivka, Lviv Oblast =

Rural locality in Lviv Oblast, Ukraine

Hradivka Градівка
- Village
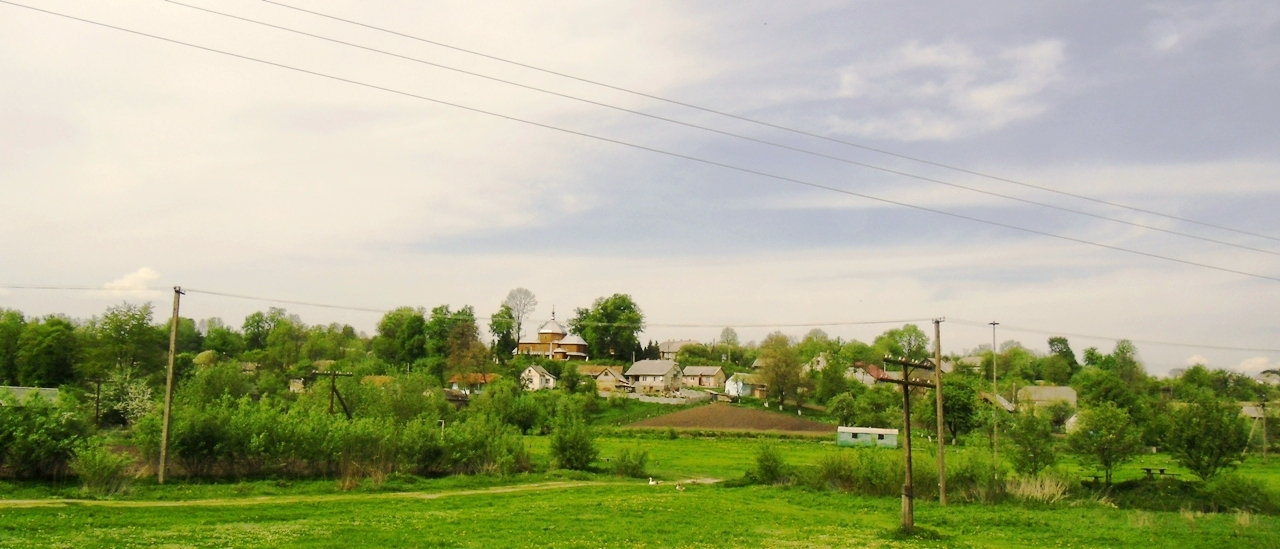
- Village Hradivka. Panoramic photo.

- Location within Lviv Oblast
- Coordinates: 49°41′32″N 23°32′36″E
- Country: Ukraine
- Oblast: Lviv Oblast
- District: Lviv Raion
- Established: 1426

Area
  - Total: 13.77 km^{2} (5.32 sq mi)
- Elevation: 299 m (981 ft)

Population
  - Total: 1,433
  - Density: 104.1/km^{2} (269.5/sq mi)
- Time zone: UTC+2 (EET)
  - Summer (DST): UTC+3 (EEST)
- Postal code: 81532
- Website: село Градівка (in Ukrainian)

Hradivka (the former name — Hoshany ), (Ukrainian: Гра́дівка, Гоша́ни) is a selo (village) in Lviv Raion, Lviv Oblast (province) of western Ukraine. It belongs to Horodok urban hromada, one of the hromadas of Ukraine. Local government — Hradivska village council. The population of the village numbers approximately 1400 people.

== Geography ==
Hradivka is located along the Highway Ukraine ( H 13) – Lviv – Sambir – Uzhhorod, 42 kilometres (26 mi) from the regional center Lviv, 17 kilometres (11 mi) from Horodok and 272 kilometres (169 mi) from Uzhhorod.

== History ==
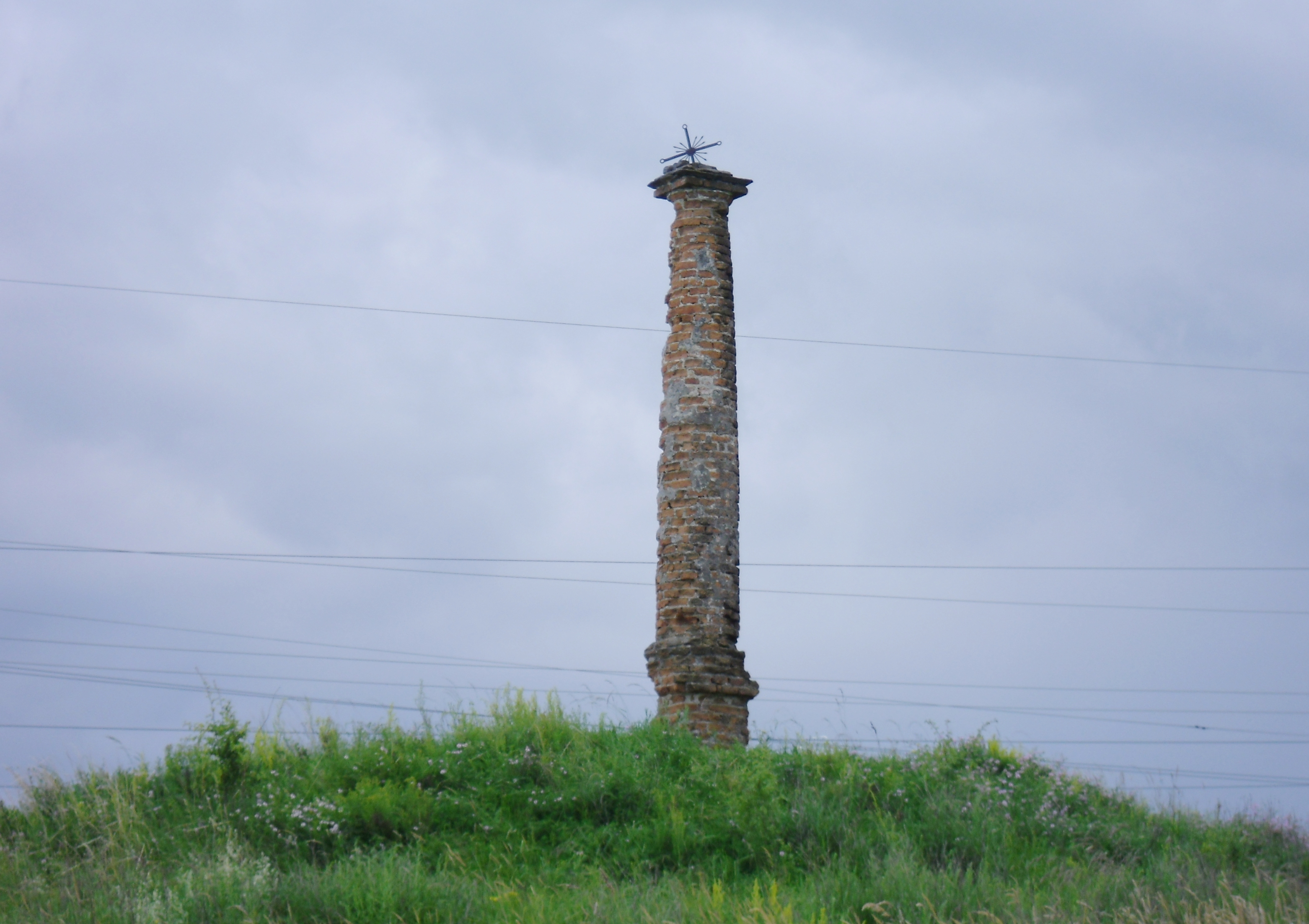
Grave of Polish soldiers of the times of the Polish–Ottoman War (1672–76).

The first record of the village called "Hoshany" dates back to 1426 year. Since 1961 — Hradivka.

Until 18 July 2020, Hradivka belonged to Horodok Raion. The raion was abolished in July 2020 as part of the administrative reform of Ukraine, which reduced the number of raions of Lviv Oblast to seven. The area of Horodok Raion was merged into Lviv Raion.

== Churches and museums ==
In the village there are two churches:

- Church of the Transfiguration (wood) 1878 (Previous church was built in 1735.) To the east of the Church is a three-tiered wooden belfry.

The church was built in 1878 (according to other sources 1854) was funded by the John Janko.
By 1934 was in the village priest Kazimir Hermak (1862 - 1934). He was a husband of sisters Josaphat Kotsylovsky.

- Church of the Holy Eucharist (stone), which was consecrated in 2011.

In the village there is a private Regional museum of historical and sightseeing. The museum was established on the initiative villager I. Jacenko. The museum has more than 3 thousand exhibits.

== Gallery ==
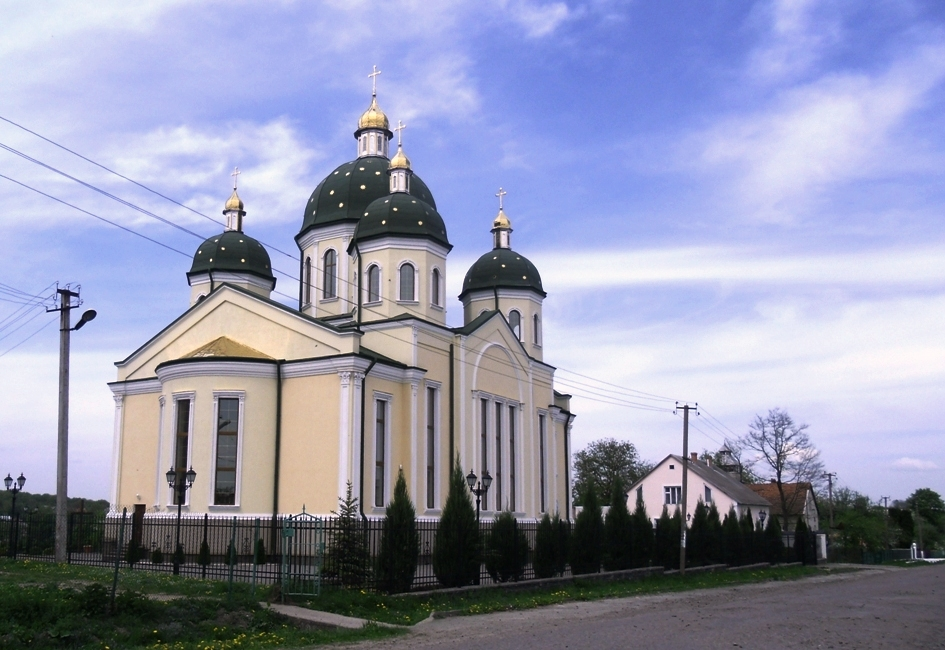
Church of the Holy Eucharist. Hradivka.

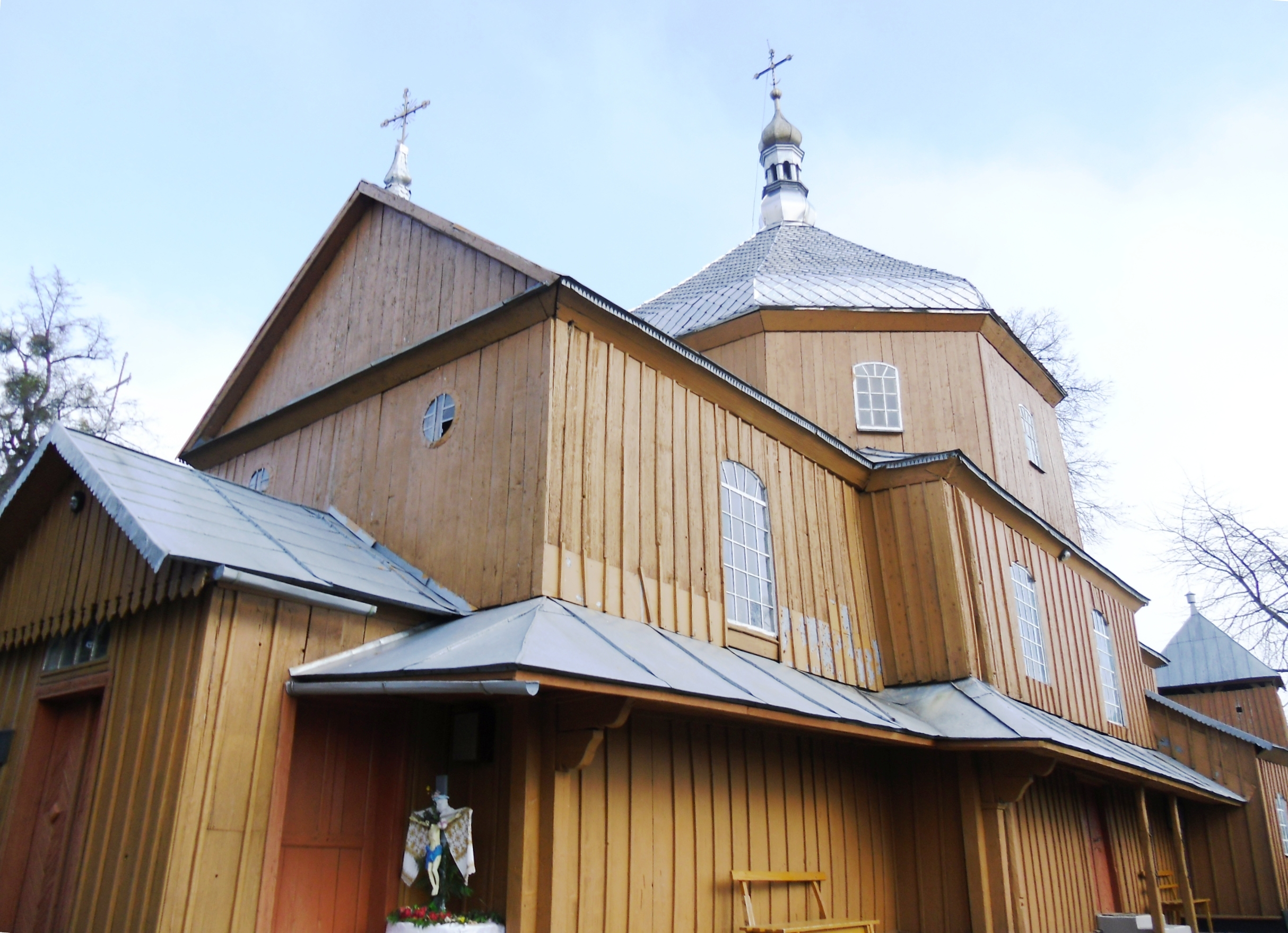
Church of the Transfiguration (wood) 1878.

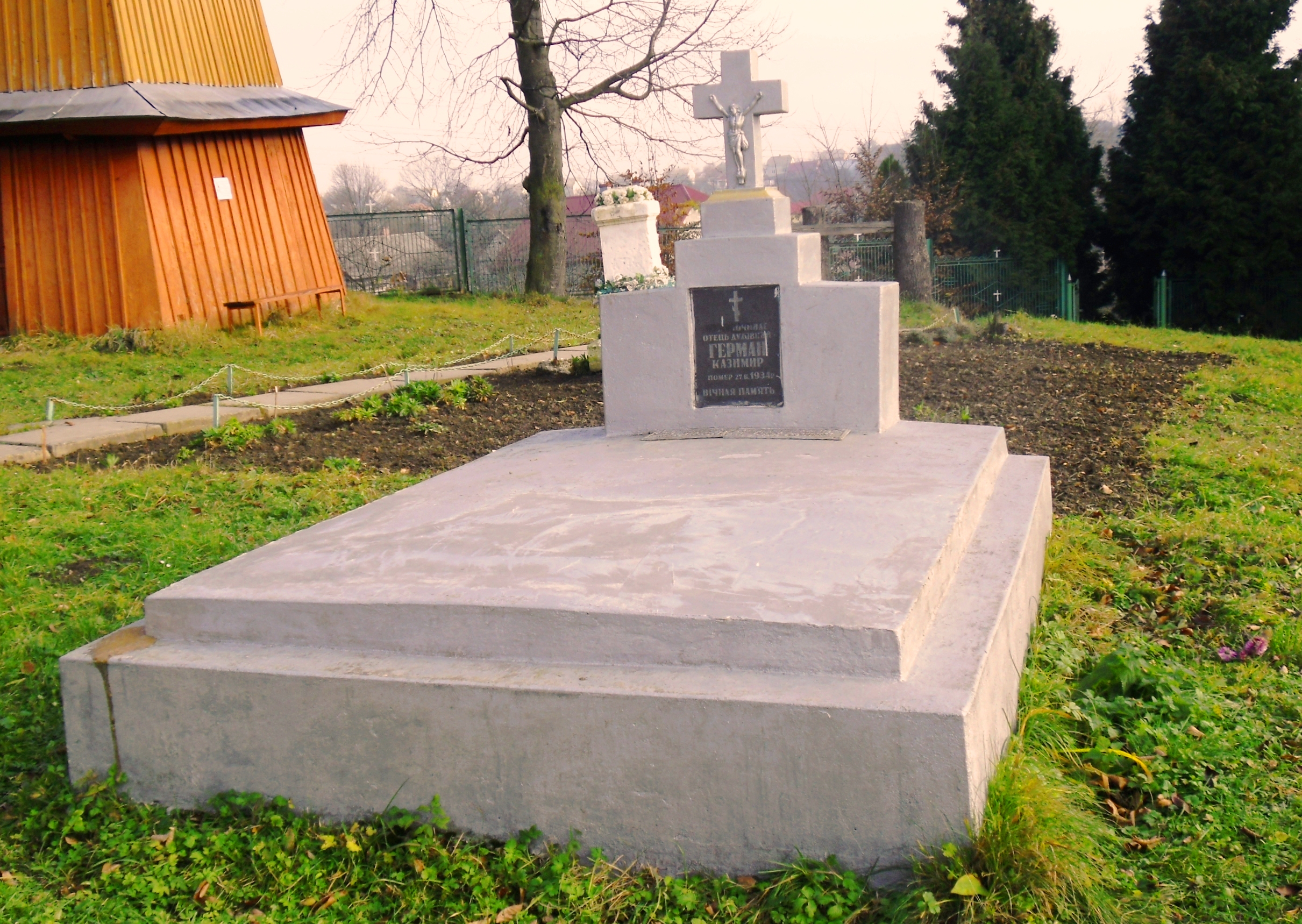
The grave of the priest Kazymyr Hermak (1862 - 1934)

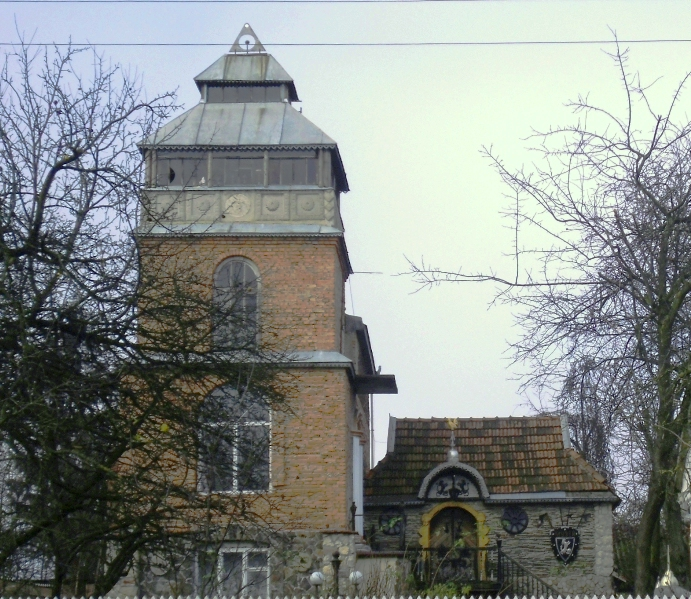
The private Castle Museum of I.Yatsenko.
