= Łoziński =

Łoziński is a Polish surname. A variant outside Poland is Lozinski. Notable people with the surname include:

- Krzysztof Łoziński (born 1948), Polish writer and publicist
- Larry Lozinski (born 1958), Canadian ice hockey player
- Lori Lozinski, Canadian film and television producer
- Marcel Łoziński (1940–2025), Polish film director and screenwriter
- Walery Łoziński (author) (1837–1861), Polish writer and publicist
- Walery Łoziński (1880–1944), Polish geographer and soil scientist
- Władysław Łoziński (1843–1913), Polish writer and historian
- Zygmunt Łoziński (1870–1932), Polish Roman Catholic bishop

== See also ==
- Lozynskyi
