= Gazeta Lwowska =

Polish language biweekly magazine

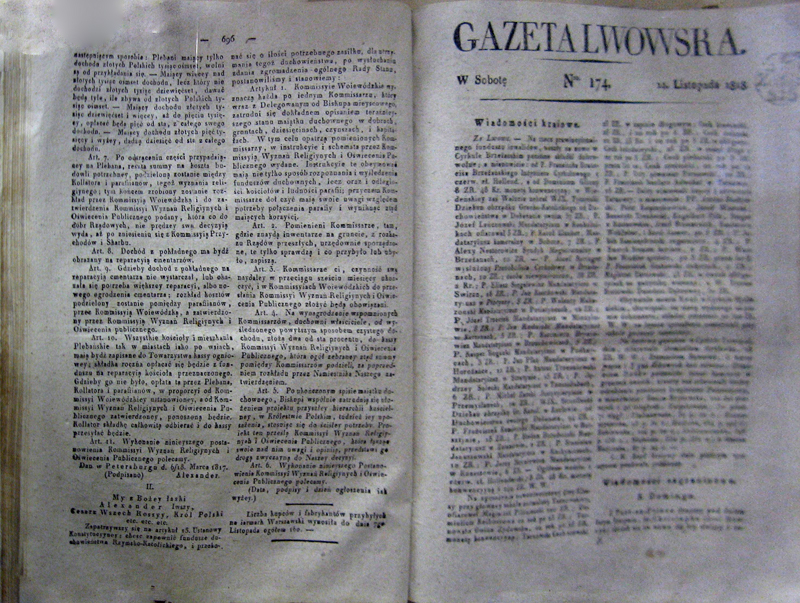
- Gazeta Lwowska, 1818
- Former editors: Władysław Łoziński, Felix Rufenach, A.G. Lehmann
- Frequency: Fortnightly
- Founded: 1811, refounded 1990
- Final issue: 1944
- Company: Association of Polish Culture of the Lviv Land
- Country: Kingdom of Galicia and Lodomeria, Second Polish Republic, Ukraine
- Language: Polish

Gazeta Lwowska (English: Lviv Gazette) is a Polish language biweekly newspaper, published since 24 December 1990 in Lviv Ukraine. The publication refers to the traditions of a Polish language paper Gazeta Lwowska, which was published between 1811 and 1944 and as such was one of the oldest Polish newspapers.

Originally, Gazeta Lwowska was a press organ of the Austrian authorities of Galicia and it limited itself to publishing legal announcements. In 1873, when Władysław Łoziński became its editor-in-chief, it began inserting local and world news, and since 1874, it published a monthly addition Przewodnik Naukowy i Literacki (Scientific and Literary Guide), dedicated to history, literature, geography, economics and ethnography. Among writers who cooperated with Gazeta Lwowska, there were Adam Krechowiecki, Ludwik Kubala, Karol Szajnocha, Józef Szujski, Alfred Wysocki, Walery Łoziński.

After 1918, when Lemberg was incorporated into the Second Polish Republic, Gazeta Lwowska was a local daily, popular in the Lwów Voivodeship. Following the joint Nazi and Soviet annexation of Poland, the newspaper stopped publication. It re-established publication briefly from July 1941 to July 1944 during the period of German occupation as vehicle for Nazi propaganda.

During German occupation, Gazeta Lwowska was very popular among readers, with the circulation reaching 90,000 in August 1943. Known as Lembergierka, Gazeta Lwowska was liked by Polish readers, as it was not as rabidly anti-Polish like the previous, defunct, Soviet-sponsored Czerwony Sztandar (1939–1941). Its editors-in-chief were only Germans, such as Felix Rufenach and A.G. Lehmann. Among Polish employees, a significant number was informally connected with the resistance movement. Gazeta Lwowska's street vendors organized a patriotic demonstration in Lwów, on 11 November 1943 (Polish independence day). On that day, several copies of the newspaper were stamped with a Polish Eagle, and with an inscription "Poland will triumph".

Gazeta Lwowska returned on 24 December 1990 as a biweekly, published by the Association of Polish Culture of the Lviv Land (Towarzystwo Kultury Polskiej Ziemi Lwowskiej - TKPZL).
