= Kubala =

Kubala (Czech/Slovak feminine: Kubalová) is a West Slavic surname. People with the surname include:

- Anton Kubala (born 1981), Slovak footballer
- Branko Kubala (1949–2018), Spanish footballer
- Filip Kubala (born 1999), Czech footballer
- Jan Kubala (born 2000), Czech footballer
- Jana Kubala (born 1966), Czech-Austrian sports shooter
- László Kubala (1927–2002), footballer and manager
- Ludwik Kubala (1838–1918), Polish historian
- Michal Kubala (born 1980), Slovak footballer
- Milan Kubala (1946–2020), Czech Paralympic athlete
- Otomar Kubala (1906–1946), commander of the Hlinka Guard
- Přemysl Kubala (born 1973), Czech volleyball player
- Ray Kubala (1942–2018), American football player

== See also ==
- Kubala (film) (1955), about footballer László Kubala
- Kulubá Maya archeologic site in Yucatan peninsula of Mexico
