= Jakub Karyś =

Polish civic activist and media professional

- Occupations: Civic activist, journalist, television producer and director
- Known for: Chair of the Committee for the Defence of Democracy

Jakub Karyś (also known as Kuba Karyś) is a Polish civic activist, journalist, and television producer and director. He has served as chair of the Committee for the Defence of Democracy (KOD) since November 2019.

== Media career ==
Karyś studied German studies and philosophy at the Jagiellonian University. He subsequently worked in television, contributing to the production of the TVN programmes Nie do wiary, Kuchenne rewolucje, and the Polish version of Top Chef.

In March 2020, he became editor-in-chief of the Rzeszów-based regional newspaper Super Nowości. He left the position in April 2022, after two years.

== Civic and political activity ==
Karyś became active in KOD in the autumn of 2015 and later led its regional organisation in the Subcarpathian Voivodeship. He stood unsuccessfully for the Sejm in the 2019 Polish parliamentary election as a Civic Coalition candidate in the Rzeszów constituency.

On 23 November 2019, an extraordinary national congress elected Karyś chair of KOD after the resignation of Krzysztof Łoziński. He was the only candidate. In September 2020, he was re-elected with the support of 115 of the 136 delegates. He won further terms in 2022 and 2024.

As KOD chair, Karyś helped organise nationwide demonstrations in August 2021 against the proposed broadcasting-law amendment commonly known as “Lex TVN”. The protests, held in more than 90 towns and cities, were supported by media organisations, opposition parties and civil-society groups.

In June 2022, Karyś signed an agreement establishing the Citizens' Election Control initiative together with representatives of Polish opposition parties and local-government organisations. He read the initiative's declaration at its launch.
