= Lozynskyi =

Surname list

Lozynskyi is the surname of the following people

- Roman Lozynskyi (born in 1994), Ukrainian politician
- Volodymyr Lozynskyi (1955-2020), Ukrainian football player and coach
- Yevhen Lozynskyi (born in 1982), Ukrainian football defender

== See also ==
- Łoziński
