= Saint Michael's Church, Rudnyky, Lviv Oblast =

Church in Lviv Oblast, Ukraine

Saint Michael's Church
- Церква Святого Архистратига Михаїла
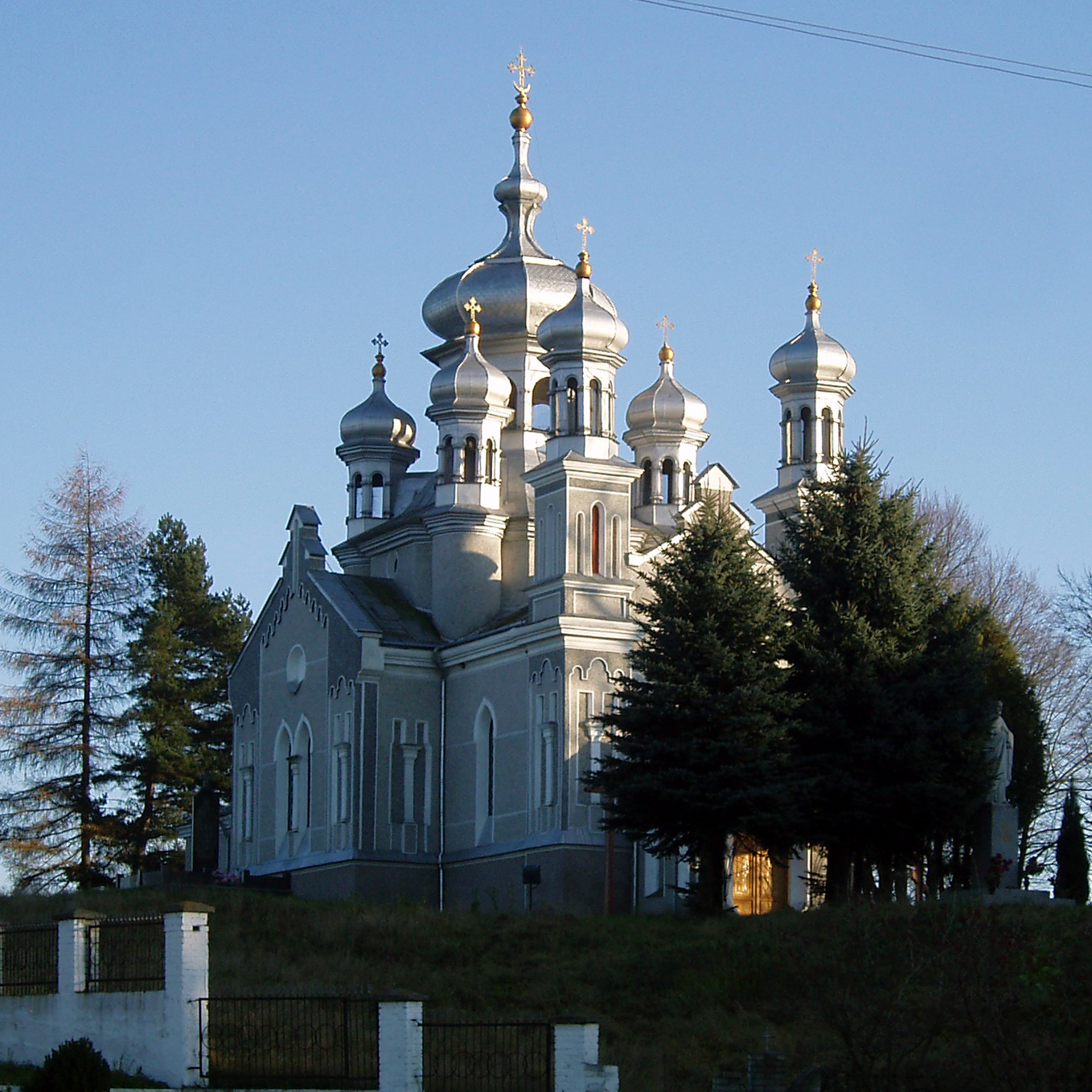

- Location within Lviv Oblast

Religion
- Affiliation: Ukrainian Greek Catholic Church

Location
- Location: Rudnyky, Mykolaiv urban hromada, Stryi Raion, Lviv Oblast, Ukraine
- Coordinates: 49°27′27″N 23°54′41″E

Architecture
- Completed: 1885

Saint Michael's Church (Ukrainian: Церква Святого Архистратига Михаїла) is a Greek Catholic parish church (UGCC) in Rudnyky of the Mykolaiv urban hromada, Stryi Raion, Lviv Oblast.

== History ==
The brick church, modeled after St Andrew's Church, was built in 1885 by a local resident Skolozdra (founder Theodozii Polianskyi), who replaced an older wooden church built in 1723 that burned down in 1880. The newly built church was consecrated in 1889.

Two antimensions (1713, 1723) from Bishops Varlaam Barlaam and Athanasius Sheptytskyi were kept in the shrine.

In 1905–1912, the church was painted (part of the mural was restored), and icons for the iconostasis were painted. All of these works were performed by the artist Teofil Kopystynskyi.

== Priests ==
- Onufrii Tserkevych (1831)
- Petro Voitynskyi (1831–1854)
- Yuliian Radkevych (1853–1855, assistant)
- Petro Hrebovskyi (1854–1855)
- Dmytro Strotskyi (1855–1885)
- Konstantyn Strotskyi (1886–1905)
- Ivan Birzhynskyi (1905–1909)
- Stefan Yavorskyi (1905–1909, assistant; 1909–1941)
- Vasyl Lavryshyn (1941–1944)
