= Rudnyky, Lviv Oblast =

Rural locality in Lviv Oblast, Ukraine

Rudnyky Рудники
- Location in Lviv Oblast Rudnyky (Ukraine)
- Coordinates: 49°26′56″N 23°54′49″E
- Country: Ukraine
- Oblast: Lviv Oblast
- Raion: Stryi Raion
- Hromada: Mykolaiv urban hromada
- Time zone: UTC+2 (EET)
  - Summer (DST): UTC+3 (EEST)
- Postal code: 81642

Rudnyky (Ukrainian: Рудники, Polish: Rudniki) is a village in the Mykolaiv urban hromada of the Stryi Raion of Lviv Oblast in Ukraine.

== History ==
The first written mention of the village was in 1515.

In the Second Polish Republic, until 1934, the village constituted an independent rural municipality (gmina) within the Żydaczów County of the Stanisławów Voivodeship. As part of the consolidation reform, on August 1, 1934, it was incorporated into the newly established rural Mikołajów nad Dniestrem municipality in the same county and voivodeship.

March 10, 1944, Ukrainian nationalists from the OUN-UPA murdered 3 Poles here as a part of Volhynia genocide. After the war, the village was detached from Poland and incorporated into the Ukrainian Soviet Socialist Republic.

On 19 July 2020, as a result of the administrative-territorial reform and liquidation of the Mykolaiv Raion, the village became part of the Stryi Raion.

== Religion ==
In 1885, a brick Saint Michael church was built in the village, modeled after Saint Andrew church in Kyiv.

== Notable residents ==
- Demian Danyliv (1997–2021), Ukrainian soldier
- Lavrentia Herasymiv (1911–1952), ethnic Ukrainian Soviet Greek Catholic nun and martyr
- Stepan Heryliv (born 1954), Ukrainian journalist, writer, volunteer
- Mykola Konchakivskyi (1919–1978), OUN activist, OUN SB super-district referent, acting district referent of the OUN SB in Horodok Raion
- Tadeusz Laskowski (1901-1989), Polish engineer, rector of Silesian University of Technology
- Zinovii Lavryshyn (1943–2017), Ukrainian composer, pianist, conductor

== Bibliography ==
- "Rudniki (2)". Geographical Dictionary of the Kingdom of Poland (in Polish). 9. Warszawa: Kasa im. Józefa Mianowskiego. 1888. p. 938.
