= Association of Polish Culture of the Lviv Land =

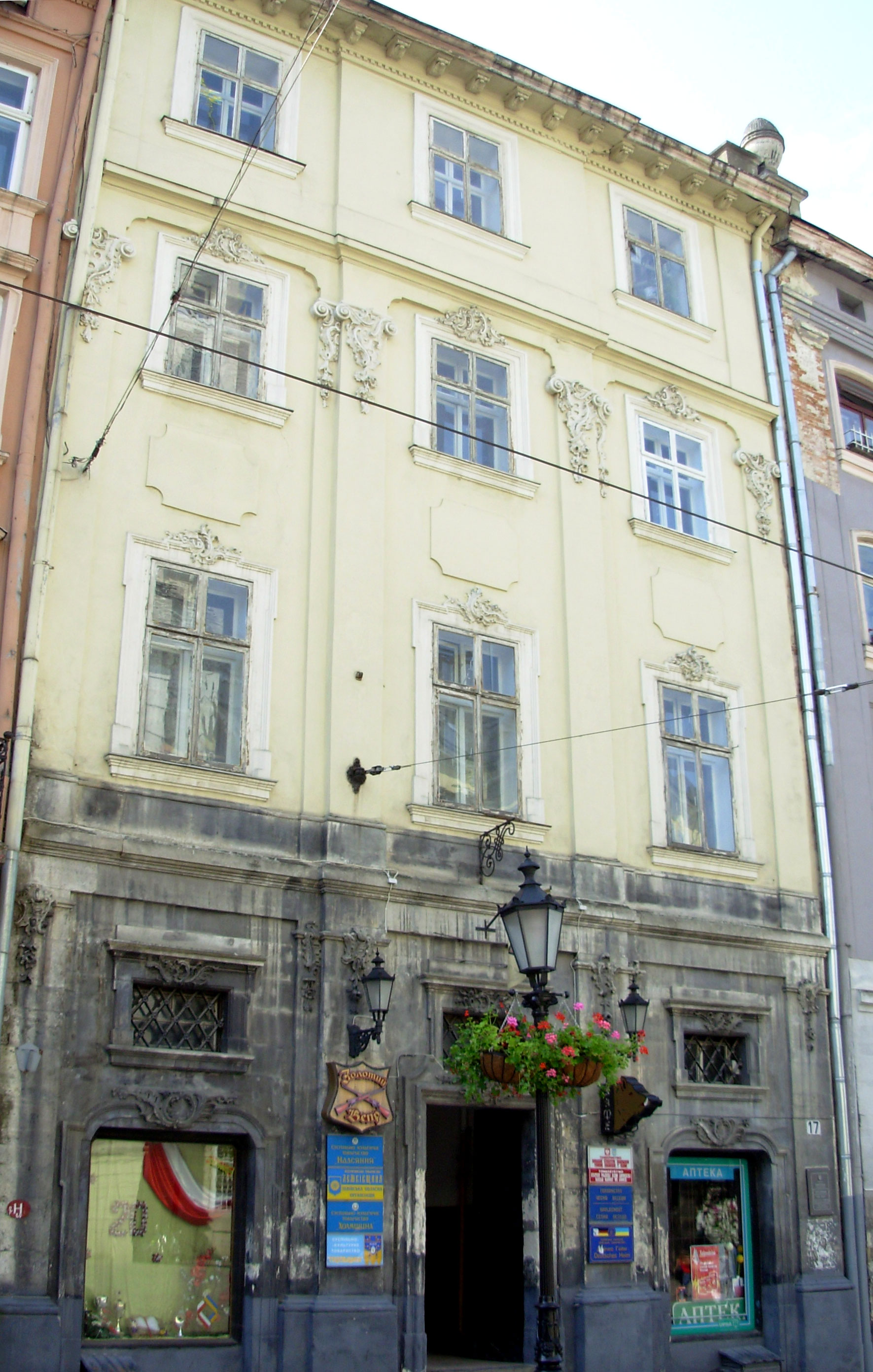
Headquarters of the Association in Lviv, Market Square 17.

Association of the Polish Culture of the Lviv Land (Polish: Towarzystwo Kultury Polskiej Ziemi Lwowskiej, Ukrainian: Товариство польської культури Львівщини) is a Polish minority association, active in Lviv Oblast (province) of western Ukraine. It was founded on December 3, 1989, in Lviv and its first director was Professor Leszek Mazepa. It engages in educational, cultural and economic activities of the Polish minority of the surrounding Lviv area.

The association has its main office in Lviv, in the house number 17 on Lviv's Main Square. It also has regional branches, in such towns as Boryslav, Dobromyl, Yavoriv, Drohobych, Lanivtsi, Mostyska, Rava-Ruska, Pnikut, Sambir, Sudova Vyshnia, Stryi, Semenivka, Susidovychi, Zolochiv, Zhovkva, Zhydachiv, Khodoriv, Chervonohrad and Skole. Its current president is Emil Legowicz, and the association publishes a Gazeta Lwowska biweekly. It also supports Association of Polish Doctors in Lviv (founded in March 1991), two choirs - Lutnia and Echo, as well as a college for senior citizens.

== See also ==
- White Eagle

== Sources ==
- Webpage of Polish consulate in Lviv
- Polish organizations in Ukraine
