= Uliana Kravchenko =

Ukrainian poet

- Уляна Кравченко
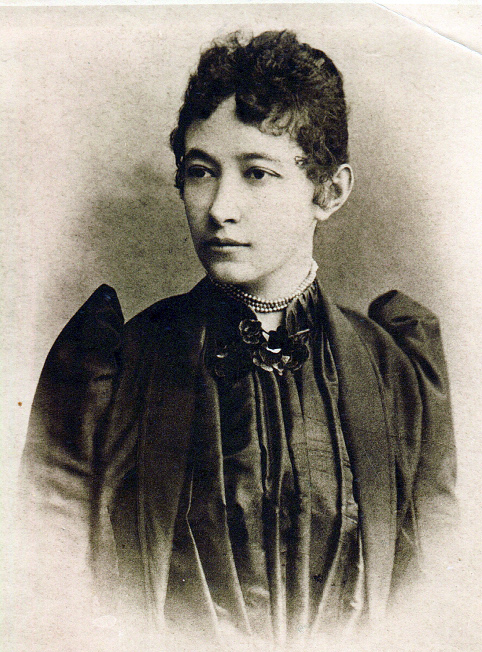
- Kravchenko in 1893
- Born: Julia Maria Schneider-Niementowska; 18 April 1860; Mykolaiv, Austrian Galicia
- Died: 31 March 1947 (aged 86); Przemyśl, Poland
- Citizenship: Austria-Hungary, later Polish Republic
- Occupations: Writer; poet
- Writing career
- Language: Ukrainian

Julia Maria Schneider-Niementowska, known by the pen name Uliana Kravchenko (April 18, 1860 – March 31, 1947), was Ukrainian educator, writer, and the first Western Ukrainian woman to publish a book of poetry.

== Biography ==
She was born in Mykolaiv, currently in Stryi Raion of Lviv Oblast, grew up in Lviv and studied at a teaching seminary. Her father was Julian Schneider an employee of the district office, while her mother was Julia Łopuszańska.

She made her first poetry attempts in Polish and Ukrainian under the guidance of her tutor Antonina Machczyńska. After graduating from the seminary, Ulyana Kravchenko began teaching in the town of Bóbrka. Her first published work was a story that appeared in the journal Zoria. Kravchenko was active in the Ukrainian women's movement in Galicia. Women's liberation was a major theme in her poetry; she was considered to be the bard of the women's movement. She was also one of the first women teachers in Galicia. In 1885, thanks to the efforts of Ivan Franko, she got a job in Lviv, but in the same year was fired for promoting socialist ideas. From then until 1900, she worked as a teacher in various villages in Galicia. In 1920 Kravchenko moved permanently to Przemyśl as a retired teacher. In 1941, she took up creative work in the Union of Soviet Writers and social work as a councilor of the Przemyśl City National Council. Kravchenko died in Przemyśl at the age of 86.

== Family ==
On November 22, 1886, she married Jan Ambroży Niementowski, head of the village school in Dolishnii Luzhok. They had three children: son Jerzy and daughters Teodora and Julia. Jerzy was a painter and poet who wrote in Polish, and was murdered at the age of 29 by Ukrainians in Yavoriv on November 28, 1918, during the Polish-Ukrainian war, while organising Polish militia.

== Selected works ==
- Prima vera, poetry (1885)
- Na novyi shliakh ("Onto a New Road"), poetry (1891)
- Prolisky ("Anemones"), children's poetry (1921)
- V dorohu ("On Our Way"), children's poetry (1921)
- Lebedyna pisnia ("The Swan Song"), children's poetry )1924)
- V zhytti ie shchos’ ("There Is Something in Life"), poetry (1929)
- Dlia neï—vse! ("For Her—Everything!"), poetry (1931)
- Shelesty nam barvinochku ("Rustle for Us, Little Periwinkle"), children's poetry (1932)
- Moï tsvity ("My Flowers"), prose collection (1933)
- Zamist’ avtobiohrafiï ("Instead of An Autobiography"), memoirs (1934)
- Spohady uchytel’ky ("Memoirs of a Teacher"), memoirs (1935)
- Vybrani poeziï ("Selected Poems"), poetry (1941)
- Khryzantemy ("Chrysanthemums"), autobiographical novella (1961)

== Bibliography ==
- Pacykowski, Józef (1969). "Ulana Krawczenko w 22 rocznicę śmierci" (PDF). Profile. 3: 22–24.
- Schubert, Jan (2012). Inspekcja grobów żołnierskich w Przemyślu. Powstanie i działalność w Galicji Środkowej 1915–1918 (in Polish). Kraków.
