= Opory =

Rural locality in Lviv Oblast, Ukraine

Opory Опори
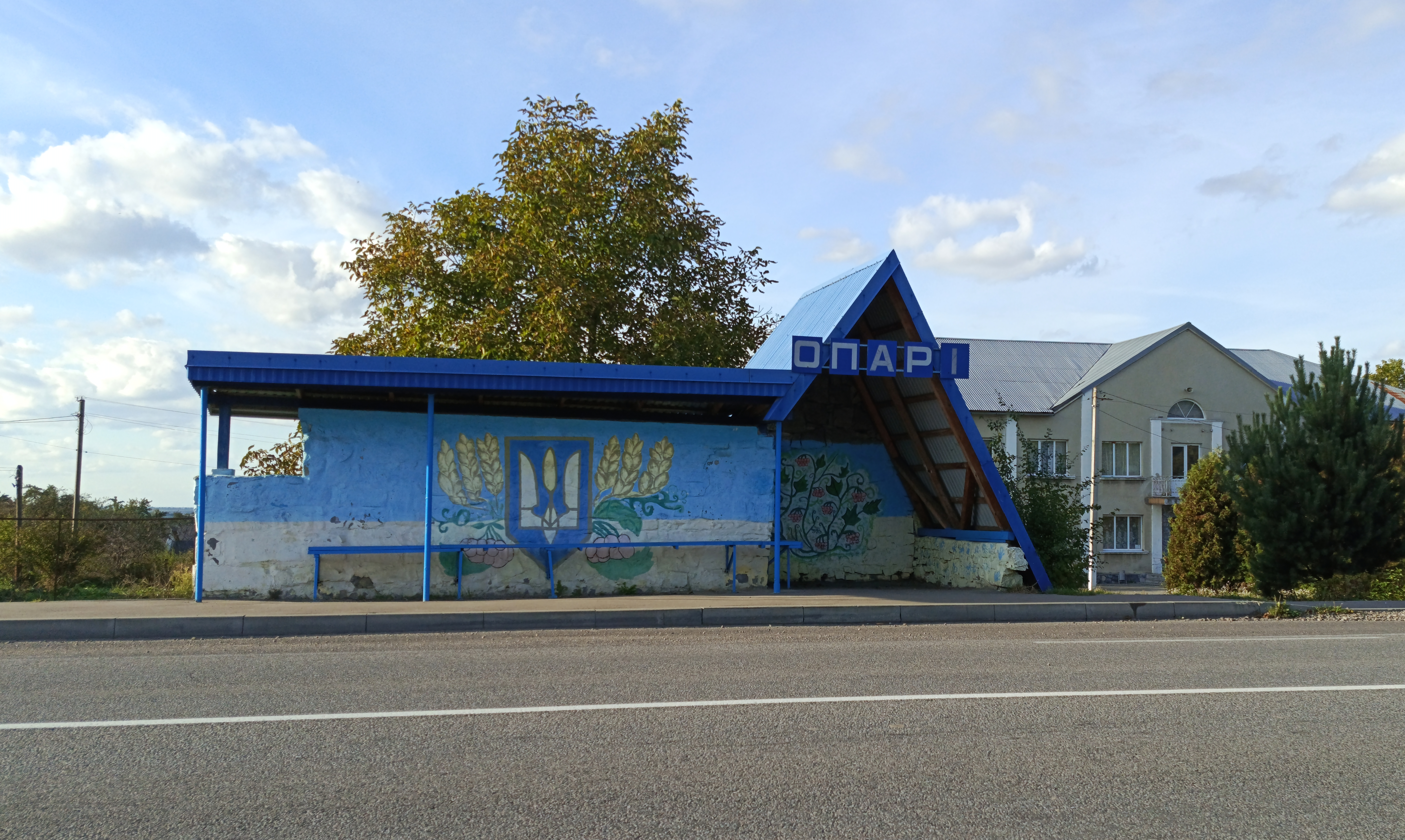
- Bus stop in Opory Ukraine

- Location in Lviv Oblast Opory (Ukraine)
- Coordinates: 49°24′53″N 23°41′47″E
- Country: Ukraine
- Oblast: Lviv Oblast
- Raion: Drohobych Raion
- Hromada: Medenychi rural hromada
- Time zone: UTC+2 (EET)
  - Summer (DST): UTC+3 (EEST)
- Postal code: 82164

Opory (Ukrainian: Опори, Polish: Opary) is a village in the Medenychi settlement hromada of the Drohobych Raion of Lviv Oblast in Ukraine.

== History ==
The village was part of Poland until 1945, located in the Lwów Voivodeship, within the Drohobych County and the Medenice, 18 kilometers northeast of Drohobych.

In 1843, Władysław Łoziński – a Polish novelist, historian, and secretary of the Ossoliński National Institute – was born in Opary.

On 19 July 2020, as a result of the administrative-territorial reform and liquidation of the Drohobych Raion, the village became part of the Drohobych Raion.

== Religion ==
- Saints Constantine and Helen church (1830)

== Notable residents ==
- Vasyl Boiko (1942–2020), Ukrainian scientist, doctor of technical sciences, professor, academician
- Władysław Łoziński (1843–1913), Polish writer, historian and art collector, known for his books about the Polish–Lithuanian Commonwealth

== Bibliography ==
- "Opary". Geographical Dictionary of the Kingdom of Poland (in Polish). 7. Warszawa: Kasa im. Józefa Mianowskiego. 1886. p. 544.
