= Władysław Łoziński =

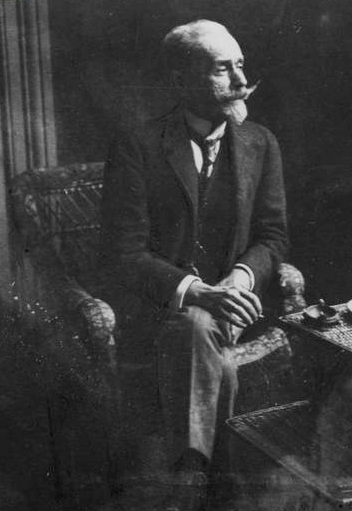
- Born: 29 May 1843; Opary near Sambir, Poland
- Died: 20 May 1913 (aged 69); Lwów, Poland
- Other names: Wojtek ze Smolnicy, Władysław Lubicz
- Occupations: Writer, historian, politician

Władysław Łoziński also known as Wojtek ze Smolnicy and Władysław Lubicz (1843–1913) was a Polish writer, historian and art collector, known for his books about the Polish–Lithuanian Commonwealth.

== Biography ==
Born on 29 May 1843 in Opary near Sambir. His father Walerian Łozinski was a Post Office officer and mother Julia born Lewicka (Lewicki – family). The brother of Walery Łoziński, also a writer, and Bronisław Łoziński – lawyer, and cousin of historian – Karol Szajnocha. He studied philosophy at the University of Lwów, and was an editor of many Galician newspapers and magazines (Dziennik Literacki, Przegląd Powszechny, Gwiazdka Cieszyńska), and especially the Gazeta Lwowska which he reformed and expanded. He was the first secretary of the Ossolineum Foundation, vice-president of the Historical Institute (Towarzystwo Historyczne), president of the Society of Friends of Arts (Towarzystwo Przyjaciól Sztuk Pięknych) and from 1891 a member of the Academy of Skills (Akademia Umiejętności, a precursor of the Polish Academy of Learning). He was also a deputy from Galicia to the Austria-Hungary National Council in Vienna and later a member of the Lord's Chamber.

He died on 20 May 1913 in Lwów and buried at Lychakivskiy Cemetery.

== Works ==
Łoziński was the author of both fictional, historical novels and more academic studies. His interest centered on the Polish–Lithuanian Commonwealth.

His most widely recognized fiction book is Oko proroka czyli Hanusz Bystry i jego przygody. It is an adventure book telling a story of Hanusz and his expedition to Turkey to find his missing father. The plot takes place in Europe of 17th century, showing main character’s adventures and up and downs. Even though the book was published at the very end of 19th century, the language is stylized to sound adequately, including Russianisms. Another notable work is Madonna Busowiska, a novel whose plot take place in Galicia at the end of the 19th century, and its main character is a peasant woman Nasta who wants to commemorate the memory of her late son by funding an icon of Mother Mary to one of the church in the village. The painter responsible for it breaks the canon of iconography by giving Mother Mary the face of her cousin which causes the outrage. It is widely believed to be one of the best work by Łoziński, because how well it showed the contemporary society.

Fiction:

- Oko proroka (Eye of the prophet) (1899)
- Madonna Busowiska (1886)

Historical texts:

- Prawem i lewem. Obyczaje na Czerwonej Rusi w pierwszej połowie XVII wieku. (Right and wrong. The customs of Red Ruthenia in the first half of the 17th century) (1903)
- Życie polskie w dawnych wiekach (Life in Poland in old times) (1907)

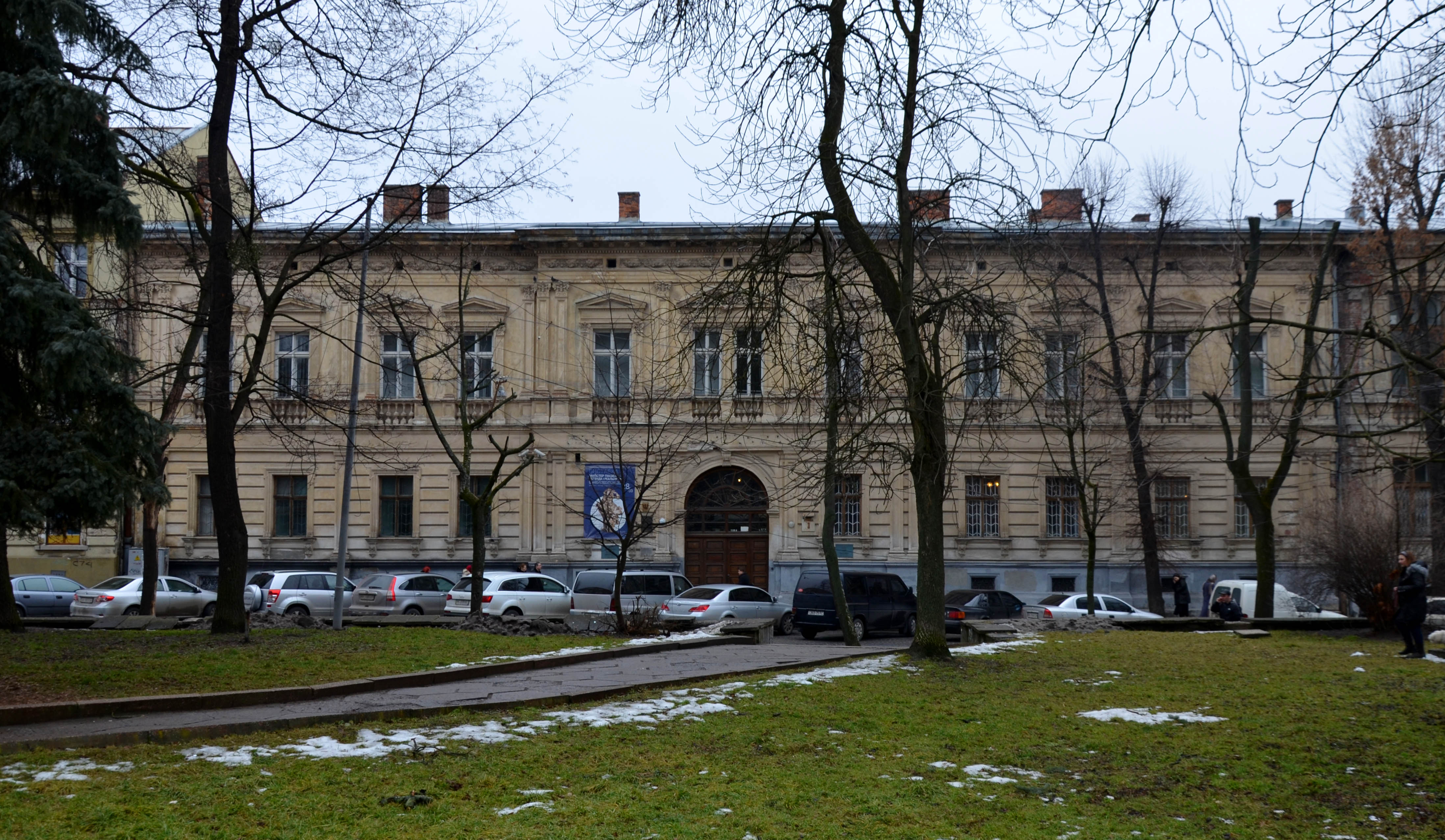
Łoziński Palace, 3 Stefanyka Street, Lviv, home of the Borys Voznytskyi Lviv National Art Gallery

== Legacy ==
Lozinski bequeathed his art collection to the city and the building accommodating it, the palace formerly owned by Isabella Diduszycka at 3 Stefanyka Street, to his nephew Valerii. During the political instability of 1914, Valerii sold the house to the City of Lviv, after which it became permanent home to the Lviv Art Gallery, now the Borys Voznytskyi Lviv National Museum.
