= Rychahiv =

Rural locality in Lviv Oblast, Ukraine

Rychahiv Ричагів
- Location in Lviv Oblast Rychahiv (Ukraine)
- Coordinates: 49°33′22″N 23°51′30″E
- Country: Ukraine
- Oblast: Lviv Oblast
- Raion: Stryi Raion
- Hromada: Mykolaiv urban hromada
- Time zone: UTC+2 (EET)
  - Summer (DST): UTC+3 (EEST)
- Postal code: 81623

Rychahiv (Ukrainian: Ричагів) is a village in the Mykolaiv urban hromada of the Stryi Raion of Lviv Oblast in Ukraine.

== History ==
One of the oldest mentions of the village dates back to 23 April 1463.

On 19 July 2020, as a result of the administrative-territorial reform and liquidation of the Mykolaiv Raion, the village became part of the Stryi Raion.

== Religion ==
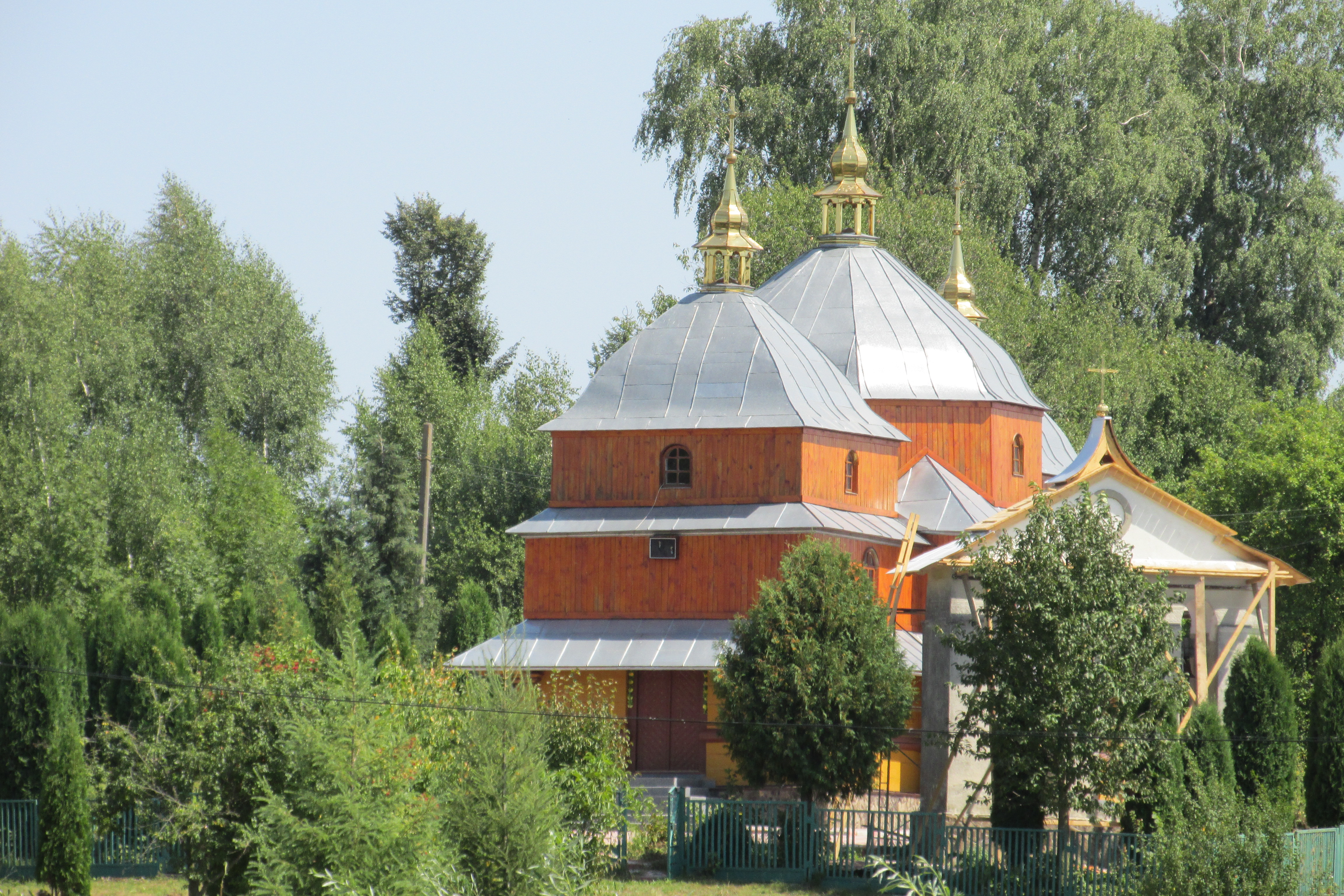

- Church of the Assumption (1872, wooden)

== Bibliography ==
- "Ryczychów". Geographical Dictionary of the Kingdom of Poland (in Polish). 10. Warszawa: Kasa im. Józefa Mianowskiego. 1889. p. 80.
