= Walery Łoziński (author) =

Polish writer (1837–1861)

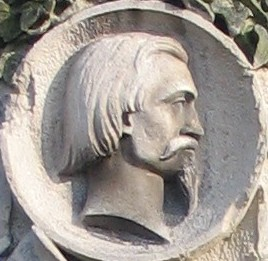
- Born: 15 January 1837 Mikołajów
- Died: 30 January 1861 (aged 24) Lwów

Walery Łoziński (15 January 1837 - 30 January 1861) was a Polish writer and publicist.

== Biography ==
Łoziński was born into a lowly noble family, his father Walerian working as postmaster and mandate administrator. He was the brother of Władysław, a historian and journalist, and the cousin of Karol Szajnocha, a historian, and Polish independence activist.

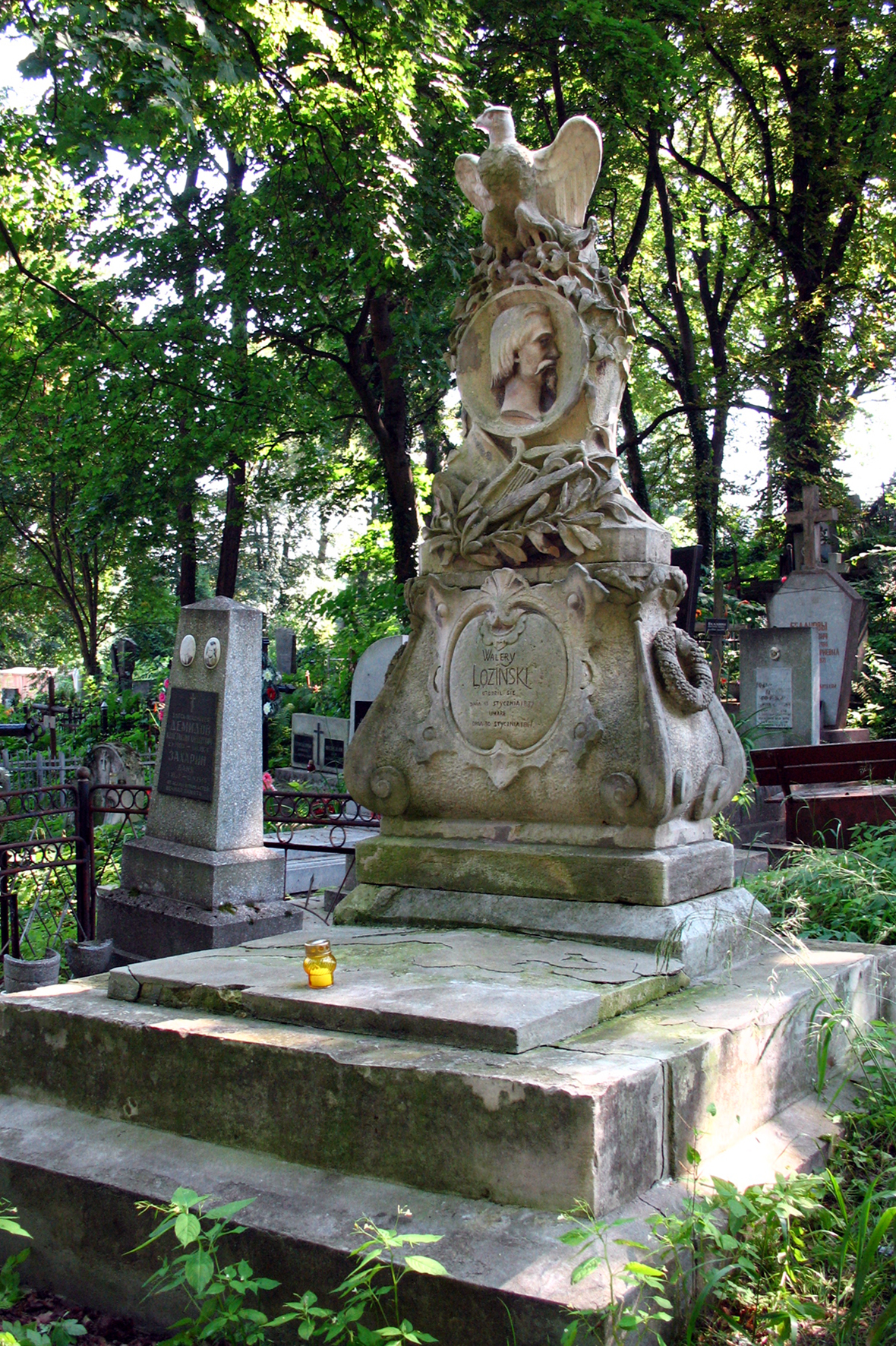
Walery Łoziński's grave in the Cmentarz Łyczakowski we Lwowie (today Lychakiv Cemetery, Ukraine)

His family moved from Mikołajów to Smolnica near Sambor (modern Sambir, Ukraine), which inspired his later pseudonym Walenty from Smolnica. He attended a gymnasium in Sambor, where he first started writing, and it was there that he finished his first, never published novel titled Kamień w Spasie. Łoziński was expelled from school in 1855 with a wolf ticket for his patriotic activity. Not wanting to be a financial burden to his parents, he moved to Lwów (modern Lviv, Ukraine) where his cousin, Karol Szajnocha, took him in and found him a job in the official editorial office of the Gazeta Lwowska where he furthered his writing career.

His novels appeared as periodical episodes in Lwów newspapers. Łoziński's work often commented on national issues, and maintained a patriotic tone; he also strongly criticised and ridiculed Austria, and for this reason his works were subjected to strict censorship.

He often integrated historical elements into his novels, often referring to the bloody events of the Galician massacre in 1846 and the Spring of Nations in 1848.

Łoziński's most well known work was The Enchanted Mansion (1859), which is considered to be the first Polish gothic style adventure novel.

== Death ==
Łoziński was known for his bellicose inclinations, his love of quarrels, and from a certain point - of duels. On January 10, 1861, Łoziński entered a saber duel with Karol Cieszewski, a well-known and popular journalist from Lwów, his editorial colleague. The disagreement was over a woman also working in the editorial office, Aniela Przyłęcka. Łoziński was wounded in the temple and died less than three weeks later as a result of post-traumatic meningitis and blood poisoning (an old wound from the previous duel with Jan Dobrzański got reinfected). The writer, heavily indebted, was buried at the city's expense. His funeral, which took place on February 2, became a great patriotic demonstration attended by the entire Polish intelligentsia of Lwów.
