= Committee for the Defence of Democracy =

Polish civic organisation

- Komitet Obrony Demokracji
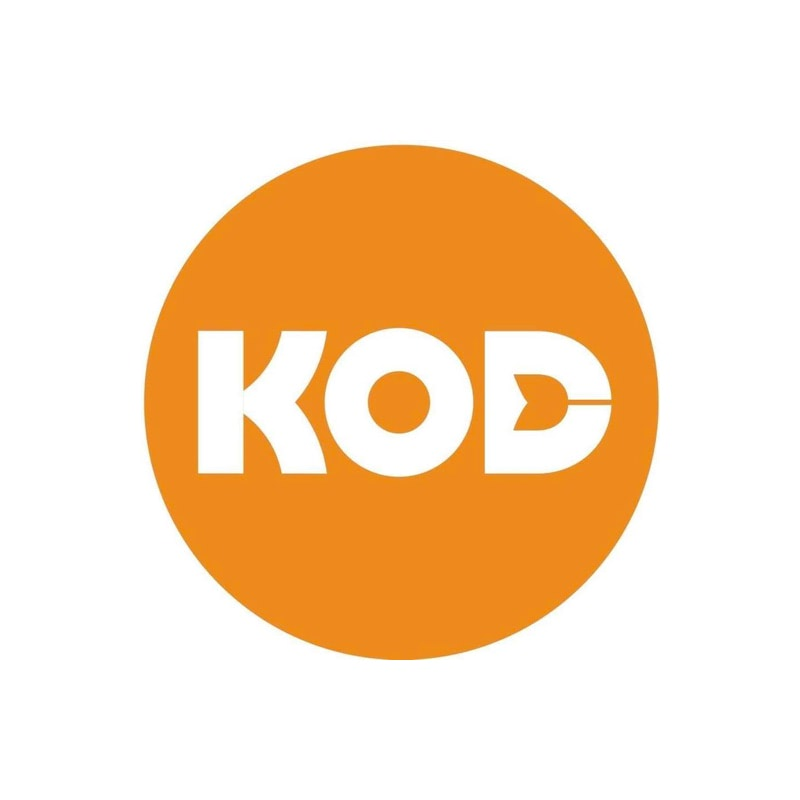
- Abbreviation: KOD
- Formation: 2 December 2015; 10 years ago
- Type: Civic association
- Headquarters: Warsaw, Poland; Brussels (international)
- Region served: Poland and internationally
- Chairperson: Jakub Karyś
- Affiliations: KOD International, KOD UK, KOD Polonia USA
- Website: ruchkod.pl

The Committee for the Defence of Democracy (Polish: Komitet Obrony Demokracji, KOD) is a Polish civic association that grew out of a movement formed in November 2015 during the constitutional crisis following the electoral victory of the Law and Justice party (PiS). It has organised demonstrations, civic-education projects and election-monitoring initiatives concerning the rule of law, judicial independence, civil rights and Poland's membership of the European Union. In 2016, KOD received the European Citizen's Prize.

== History ==
=== Formation and early protests ===
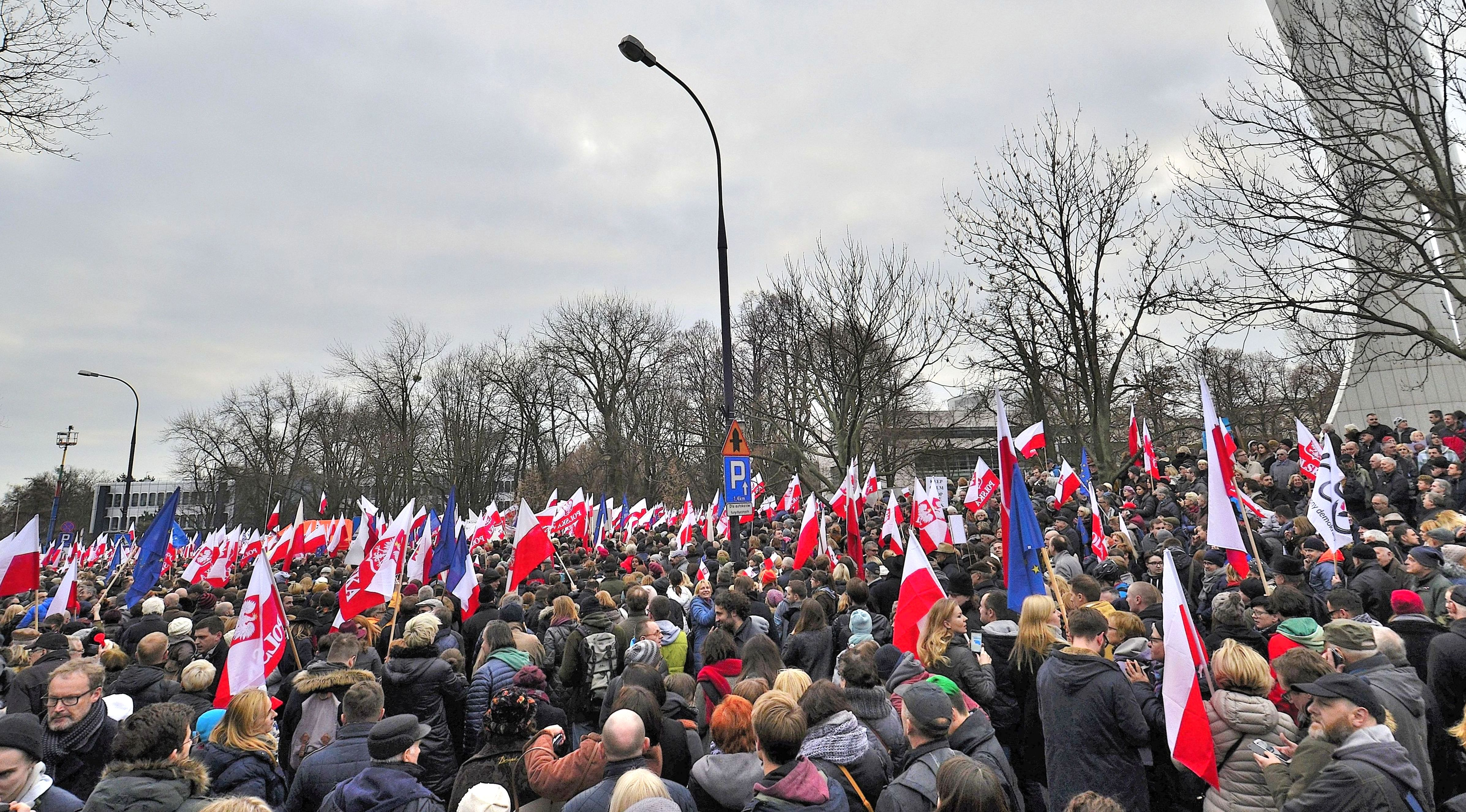
A KOD demonstration in Warsaw on 19 December 2015

The immediate inspiration for KOD was an article published on 18 November 2015 by journalist and former anti-communist opposition activist Krzysztof Łoziński. Referring to Václav Havel's essay The Power of the Powerless and the example of the Workers' Defence Committee, Łoziński called for the creation of a citizens' committee to defend democratic institutions. Mateusz Kijowski subsequently created a Facebook group using the proposed name, and KOD developed into a nationwide movement. The association was formally established at a meeting of 21 founders in Warsaw on 2 December 2015.

KOD emerged shortly after PiS became the first party since the end of communist rule to win an outright parliamentary majority, and amid a dispute over appointments to the Constitutional Tribunal. Its first actions included an open letter urging President Andrzej Duda to swear in three judges elected by the previous parliament and demonstrations defending the role and independence of the Tribunal.

On 12 December 2015, tens of thousands of people joined a KOD march in Warsaw. Estimates ranged from 17,000–20,000 by police to about 50,000 by the city authorities and media organisations. Further demonstrations took place on 19 December in Warsaw, more than twenty other Polish towns and several cities abroad.

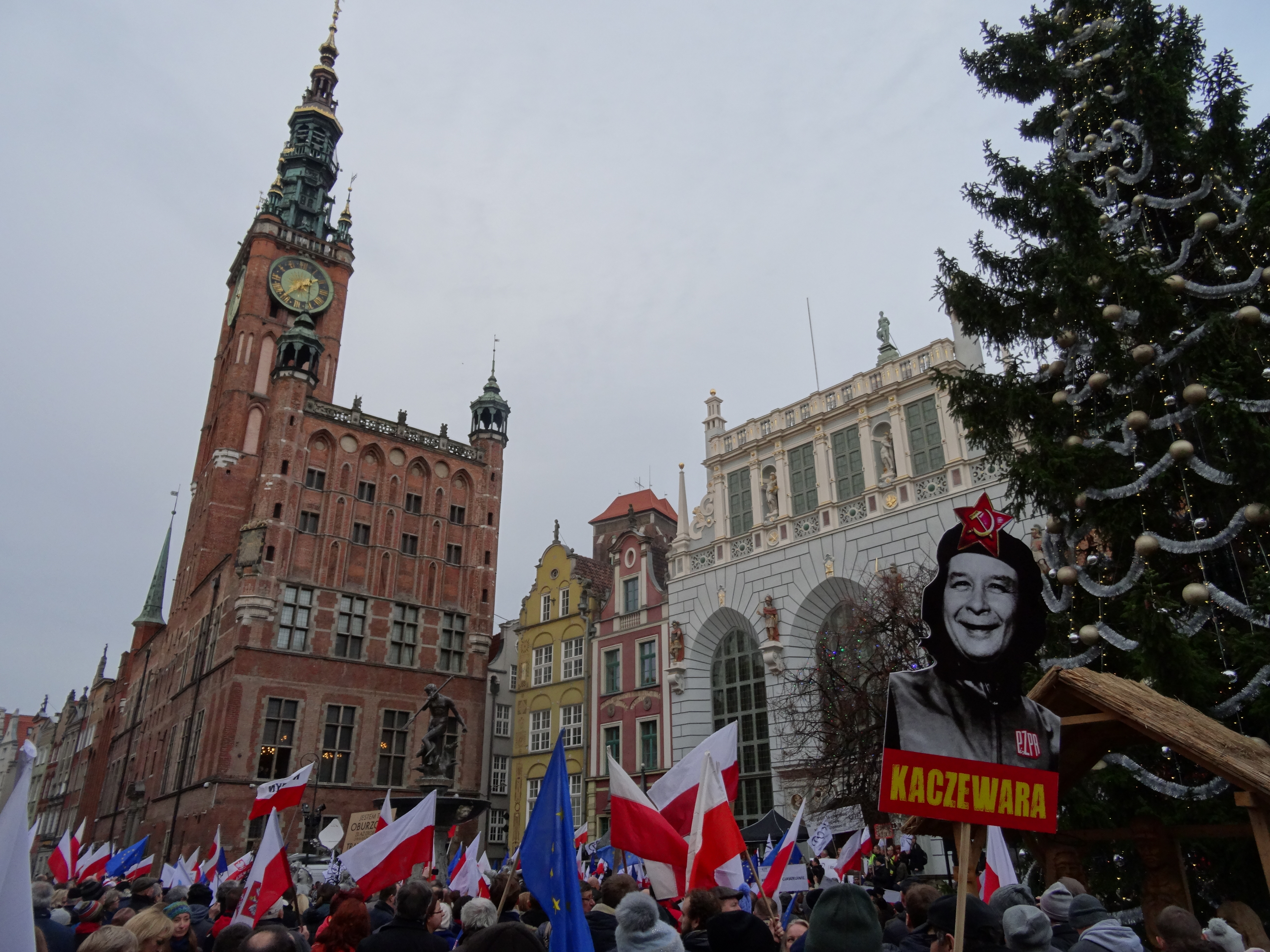
A KOD demonstration in Gdańsk on 19 December 2015

KOD continued to organise protests during 2016 over the constitutional dispute, changes to the public media and other government policies. On 7 May it organised a pro-European march in Warsaw together with opposition parties and other organisations. Police estimated that about 45,000 people attended, while Warsaw city officials gave an estimate of 240,000. In the same year, the European Parliament included KOD among the recipients of its European Citizen's Prize.

=== Leadership changes and rule-of-law protests ===
In January 2017, KOD's board called on Kijowski to resign after media disclosed payments made by the association to a company owned by him and his wife. He withdrew from the leadership election later that year, and Łoziński was elected chairperson in May 2017. KOD subsequently participated in nationwide protests against changes to the National Council of the Judiciary, the ordinary courts and the Supreme Court.

Łoziński temporarily suspended his duties in December 2018 and resigned in June 2019. Deputy chair Magdalena Filiks served as acting chair until she was elected to the Sejm in the 2019 Polish parliamentary election. Jakub Karyś was elected chairperson at an extraordinary national congress in November 2019 and was subsequently re-elected.

In December 2019, KOD and the Helsinki Foundation for Human Rights were among the organisations that called demonstrations against legislation allowing disciplinary action against judges who questioned government-backed judicial changes.

In June 2024, the convictions of Kijowski and KOD's former treasurer for certifying false invoices for purported IT services to the association became final. Kijowski received an eight-month suspended prison sentence; he maintained his innocence and announced that he would seek review by the Supreme Court.

=== Election observation and later activity ===
From 2022 to 2024, KOD participated in a programme funded by the Active Citizens Fund that concentrated on the rule of law, media freedom, human rights and civic education. Ahead of the 2023 Polish parliamentary election, it ran the Wybory bez picu (roughly, "Elections without tricks") campaign as part of the Citizens' Election Control initiative. The project recruited and coordinated approximately 27,000 citizen observers. It also collected results from a representative sample of 1,024 polling stations for a late-poll estimate; the average difference between its estimates for the five principal electoral lists and the final results was reported as 0.19 percentage points. The campaign received the 2024 Platinum SABRE Award for the best campaign in the EMEA competition.

KOD also deployed citizen observers during the 2025 Polish presidential election. Before the second round, however, the association formally endorsed Rafał Trzaskowski. In its final report, the Office for Democratic Institutions and Human Rights stated that the endorsement called into question KOD's role as a non-partisan and impartial observer organisation.

== Organisation ==
KOD is a registered association headquartered in Warsaw. Its fields of activity include defending the rule of law and human rights, supporting media freedom, civic education and European integration, and developing civil society in Poland and among Polish communities abroad. It operates through regional branches. As of September 2026, its main board was chaired by Jakub Karyś.

In 2016 KOD also established a formal representation in Brussels under the name Committee for the Defence of Democracy (also using the informal name KOD International), to coordinate its international structures and maintain relations with European Union institutions and other international bodies. Martin Mycielski was a co-founder of the Brussels-based association and was named its first president, while also serving as KOD's board plenipotentiary for international affairs. Its international structures have included chapters and affiliated associations elsewhere in Europe and in North America, Asia and Australia, among them KOD UK and KOD Polonia USA.

== See also ==
- 2015–present Polish constitutional crisis
- Citizens of Poland
- Protests against Polish judiciary reforms
