= Lavrentia Herasymiv =

Nun, martyr in Siberia (1911–1952)

Lavrentia (Levkadia) Herasymiv (alternatively transliterated Harasymiv, in Ukrainian: Лаврентія Левкадія Іллівна Гарасимів) was an ethnic Ukrainian Soviet Greek Catholic nun and martyr.

Lavrentia Herasymiv, born Levkadia, on September 30, 1911 in Rudnyky, Lviv Region. She became a nun in 1933. In 1950, she was arrested by the NKVD and sentenced to exile in Tomsk Oblast. She was sick with tuberculosis when she arrived and only one family agreed to give her a place to live. Here she lived with a paralyzed man, behind a partition. She never received proper medical attention.

On August 28, 1952, she died in Kharsk in Siberia's Tomsk Region.

== Testimony of Sister Lavrentia's capture ==
The NKVD agents attacked our convent. They spent a long time breaking down the door. It was night-time; the sisters were terrified. Sister Lavrentia ran to the cellar and escaped into the garden through a little window. A cold rain started to fall. When the NKVD broke into the house they immediately noticed the open window and ran to look for her. It was dark and with their bayonets they poked every bush. A few times the bayonet was right in front of Sister’s eyes. Not finding her, the NKVD went away, but sister was out in the rain until the morning. She came to the house exhausted and frozen. After this incident she got seriously ill, and lay in bed. They took her to prison when she was infirm. – From the memories of a relative, Anna Harasymiv.
