= Association of Poles "White Eagle" =

The Association of Poles “White Eagle”, or Związek Polaków „Orzeł Biały”, «Союз Поляків «Білий Орел», is an association of the Poles in Ukraine (see also Polonia), founded on June 6, 2011 in Lviv. It supports the development of Polish culture in the city, and has over 800 members.

The association runs courses of the Polish language and the history and culture of Poland. It has a library, organizes showings of Polish films, helps local Poles with their legal problems, consults on the Karta Polaka and helps young Poles from the area of Lviv who want to study in Poland. It also cooperates with several cultural organizations from Poland. Its current chairman is Sergiusz Łukjanenko.

== Sources ==
- Ruszyła poradnia prawna dla Polaków
- „Orzeł Biały” rozkłada skrzydła
