= Mykolaiv urban hromada, Lviv Oblast =

Urban hromada in Lviv Oblast, Ukraine

Mykolaiv urban hromada Миколаївська міська громада
- Hromada
- Seal
- Interactive map of Mykolaiv urban hromada
- Coordinates: 49°31′29″N 23°58′44″E
- Country: Ukraine
- Oblast: Lviv Oblast
- Raion: Stryi Raion
- Admin. center: Mykolaiv

Area
  - Total: 304.6 km^{2} (117.6 sq mi)

Population (2020)
  - Total: 34,257
  - Density: 112.5/km^{2} (291.3/sq mi)
- Settlements: 24
- Cities: 1
- Villages: 23
- Website: mykolaivmr.gov.ua

Mykolaiv urban territorial hromada (Ukrainian: Миколаївська територіальна громада, romanized: Mykolaivska miska terytorialna hromada) is a hromada in Ukraine, in Stryi Raion of Lviv Oblast. The administrative center is the city of Mykolaiv. Its population is 34 257 (2020 est.).

== Settlements ==
The hromada consists of 1 city (Mykolaiv) and 23 villages:

- Bilche
- Bolonia
- Velyka Horozhanna
- Verbizh
- Hirske
- Honiatychi
- Drohovyzh
- Kahuiv
- Kolodruby
- Krynytsia
- Lypytsi
- Lystvianyi
- Mala Horozhanna
- Novosilky-Oparski
- Pavuky
- Pidlissia
- Poverhiv
- Radelychi
- Rychahiv
- Rudnyky
- Saikiv
- Trudove
- Ustia
