= Mykolaiv, Lviv Oblast =

City in Lviv Oblast, Ukraine

Mykolaiv Миколаїв Миколаїв над Дністром Mykolaiv nad Dnistrom
- City
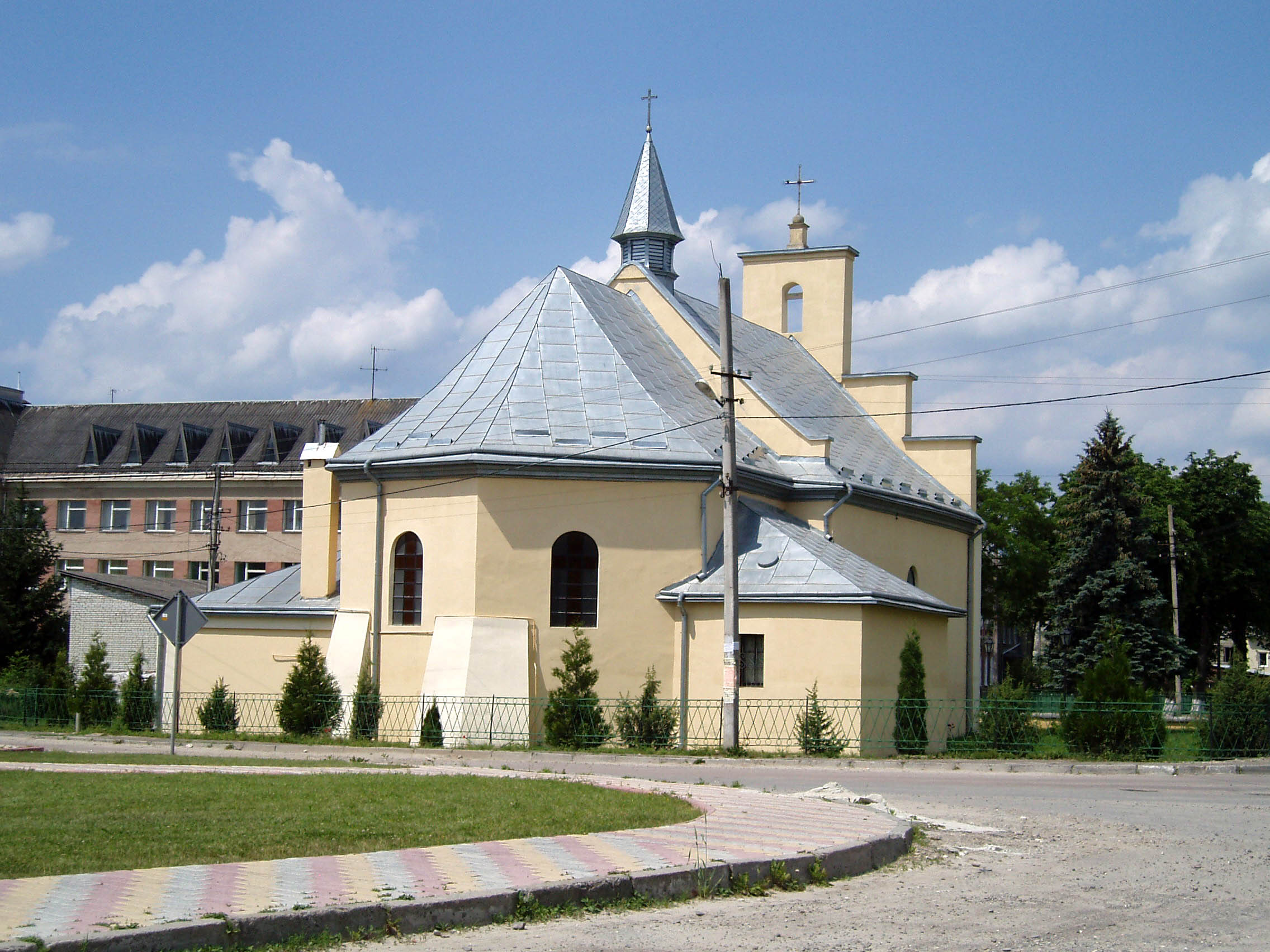
- Church of Saint Nicholas

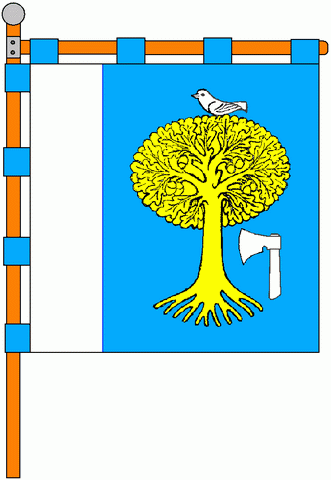
- Flag Coat of arms

- Location of Mykolaiv in Ukraine Mykolaiv (Ukraine)
- Coordinates: 49°31′29″N 23°58′44″E
- Country: Ukraine
- Oblast: Lviv Oblast
- Raion: Stryi Raion
- Hromada: Mykolaiv urban hromada
- Founded: 1570
- Town rights: 1570

Population (2022)
  - Total: 14,498
- Time zone: UTC+2 (EET)
  - Summer (DST): UTC+3 (EEST)

Mykolaiv or Mykolayiv (Ukrainian: Миколаїв, IPA: [mɪkoˈlɑjiu̯]; Polish: Mikołajów) is a city in Stryi Raion, Lviv Oblast (region) in western Ukraine. It hosts the administration of Mykolaiv urban hromada, one of the hromadas of Ukraine. The population is approximately 14,498 (2022 estimate).

To distinguish Mykolaiv from the much larger southern city, the former is sometimes called Mykolaiv on Dniester (Ukrainian: Миколаїв над Дністром, Mykolaiv nad Dnistrom) after the major river it situated on (while the latter is located on the Southern Buh, another major river). The closest railway station is officially called Mykolaiv-Dnistrovskyi.

== History ==
The territory of modern Mykolaiv Raion, Lviv Oblast formed part of the Kingdom of Poland since the reign of King Casimir III the Great. For a short period, between 1370 and 1387, it was part of the Kingdom of Hungary, before being reintegrated with Poland. In 1570 near the former Polish royal village Drohowyż, chorąży (ensign) of Przemyśl, Polish nobleman Mikołaj Tarło founded the town which was named Mikołajów after him. The Topór coat of arms of the Tarło family is included within the town's coat of arms. By virtue of a privilege issued in February 1570, Polish King Sigismund II Augustus granted it Magdeburg town rights, established two annual fairs and exempted the town from taxes for 20 years. It was a private town of Poland, its first owner was Mikołaj Tarło. In 1576, King Stephen Báthory confirmed these privileges and allowed the production of vodka. In 1593, after a fire, King Sigismund III Vasa exempted Mikołajów from taxes again. By 1595 it belonged to the Polish diplomat Jerzy Mniszech, who in 1607 founded a Catholic parish here. In 1636 the church of Saint Nicholas was consecrated.

In 1772, following the First Partition of Poland, the town was annexed by the Habsburg Empire, where it remained until late 1918. In the interwar period, it returned to Poland, and belonged to the Stanisławów Voivodeship. After the invasion of Poland it was under Soviet occupation from 1939 to 1941. In June 1941 the NKVD murdered an unknown number of Poles and Ukrainians in a local prison. After that, the town was from 1941 to 1944 under German occupation. At that time, the Polish Home Army underground resistance movement operated here. During the second period of Soviet occupation in 1944–1945, the Soviets deported Polish inhabitants deep into the Soviet Union. After the war, in accordance with the Potsdam Agreement, it was taken from Poland and annexed by the Soviet Union, where it was included in the Ukrainian Soviet Socialist Republic.

Until 18 July 2020, Mykolaiv was the administrative center of Mykolaiv Raion. The raion was abolished in July 2020 as part of the administrative reform of Ukraine, which reduced the number of raions of Lviv Oblast to seven. The area of Mykolaiv Raion was merged into Stryi Raion.

== Population ==
=== Language ===
Distribution of the population by native language according to the 2001 census:

Language	Number	Percentage
Ukrainian	14 554	98.44%
Russian	204	1.38%
Other or undecided	26	0.18%
Total	14 784	100.00%

== Notable people ==
In 1837, Polish romantic writer Walery Łoziński was born here. Uliana Kravchenko a Ukrainian educator, writer, and the first Galician woman to publish a book of poetry was born here in 1860.

== Transport ==
European route E471 which connects Mukachevo in Zakarpattia Oblast with Lviv, runs through the city. The city also has a train station.

== Gallery ==
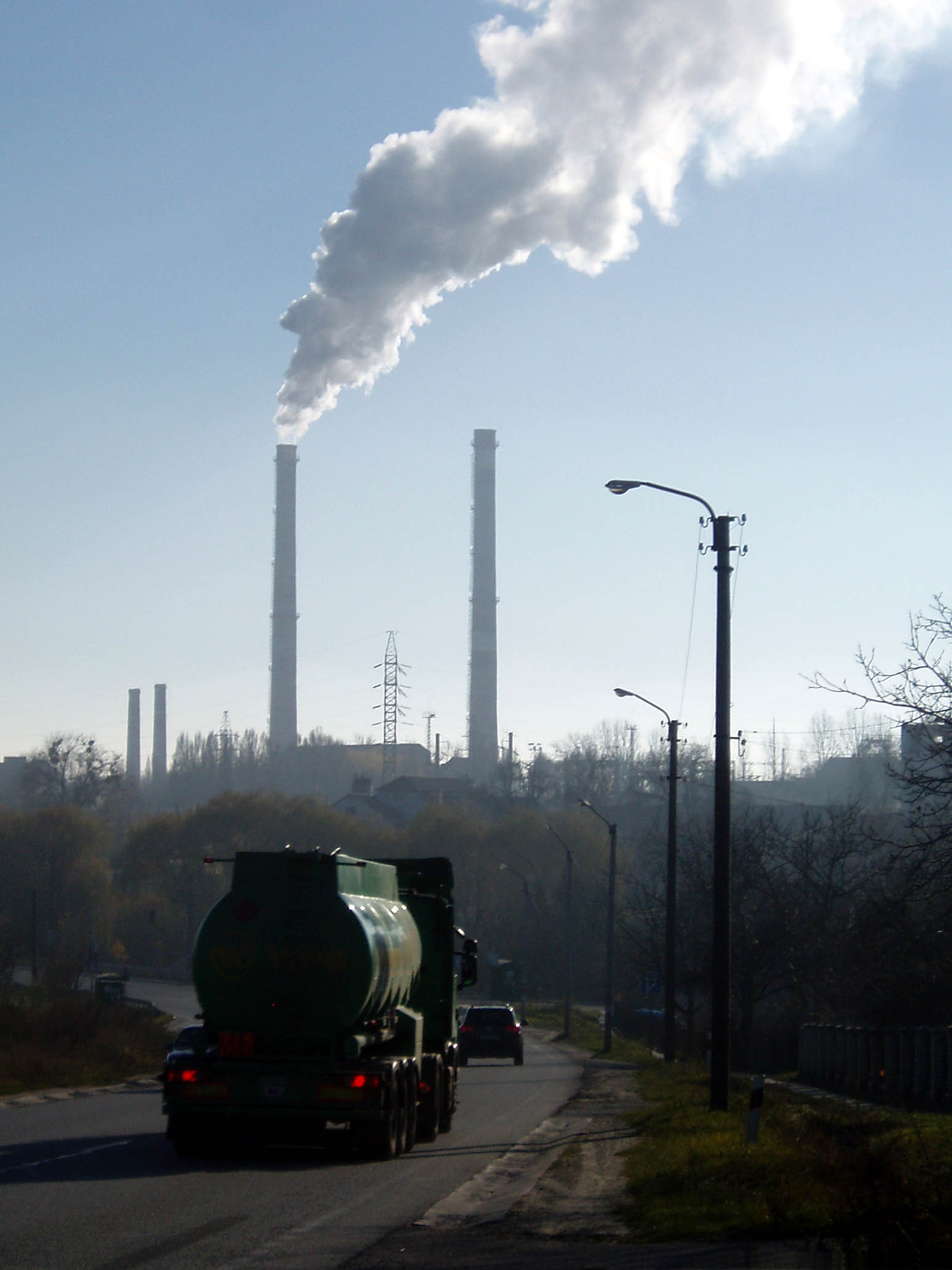
Mykolaiv Cement Factory

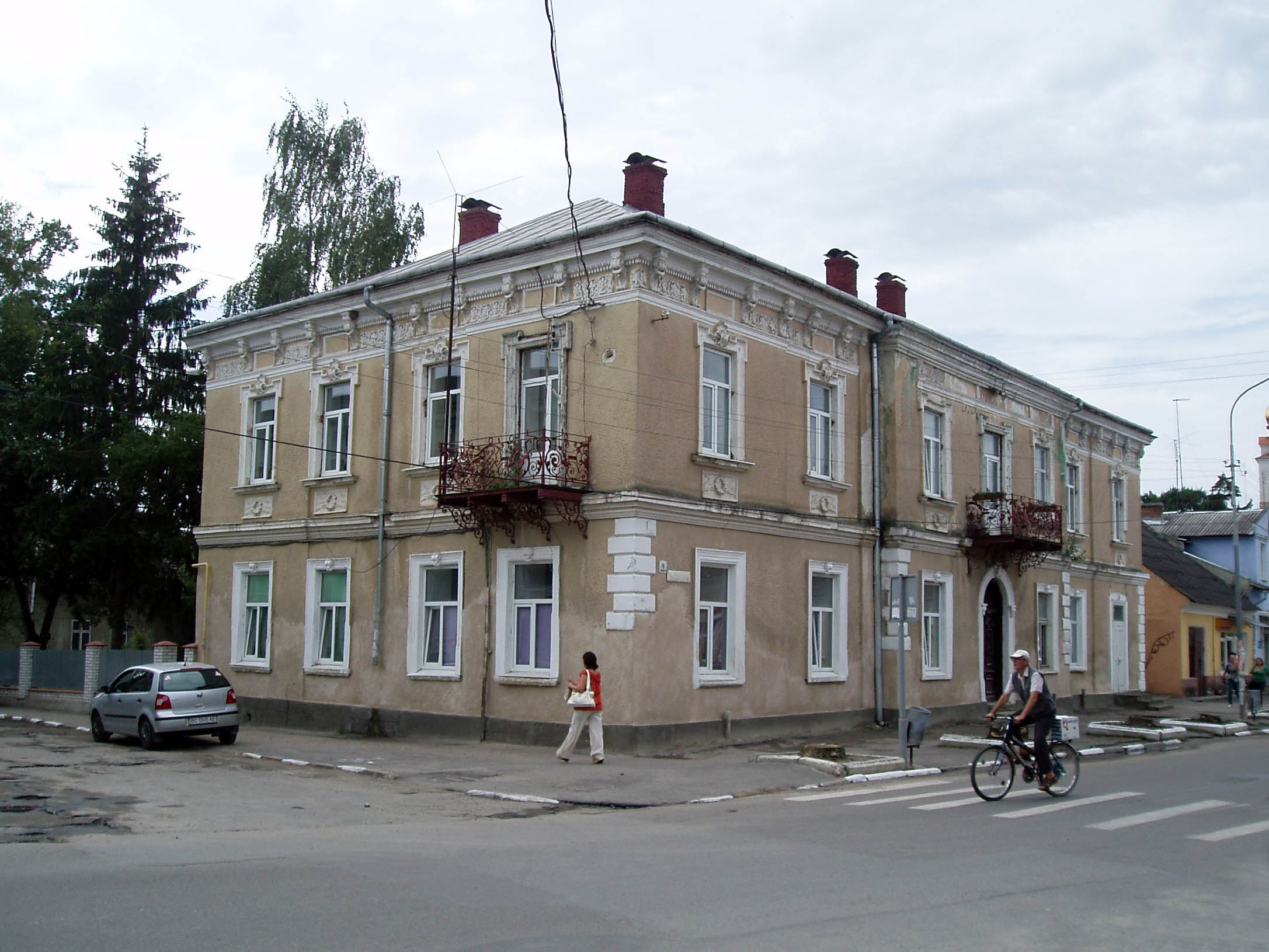
Preserved old townhouse

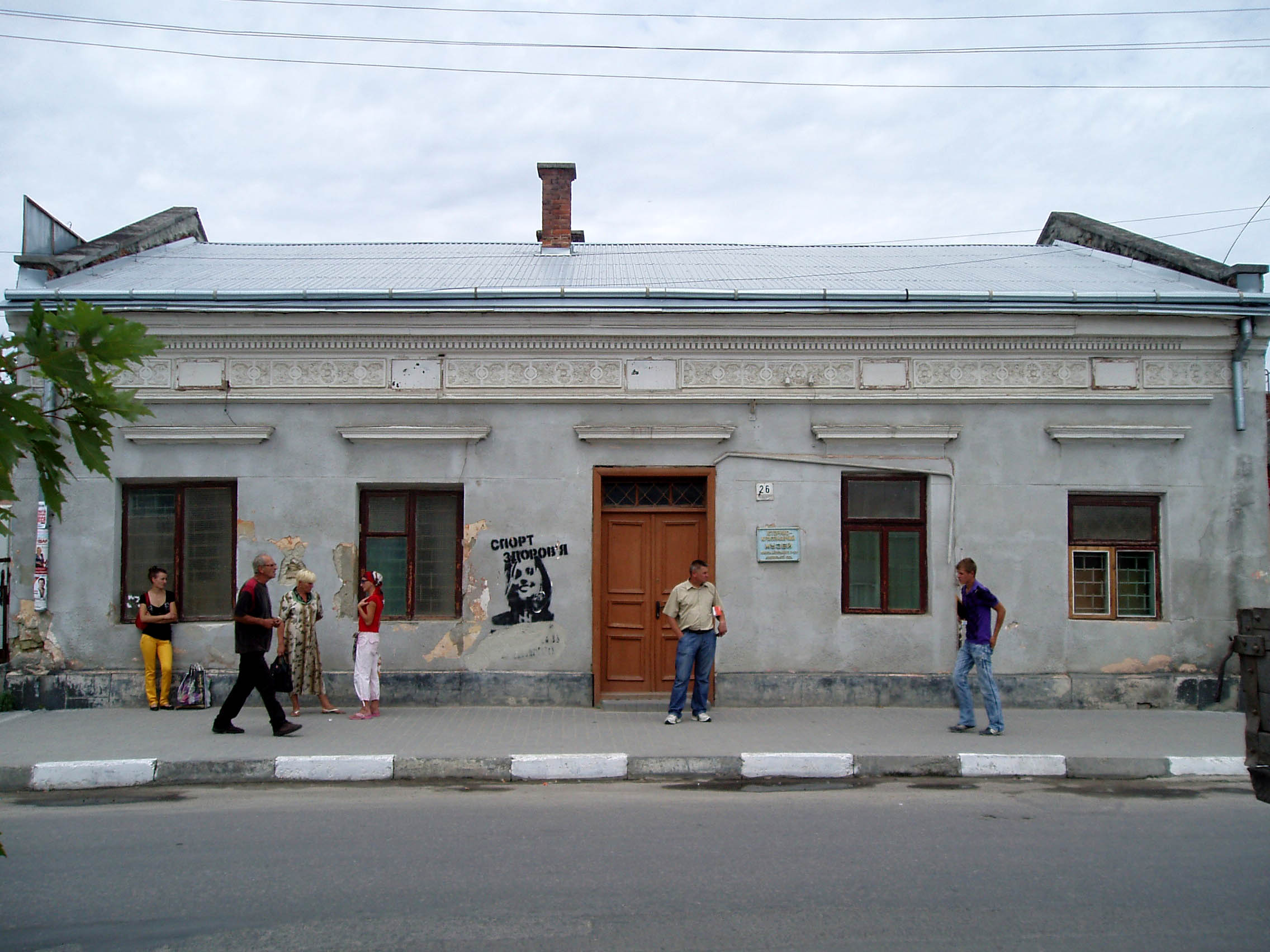
Local museum

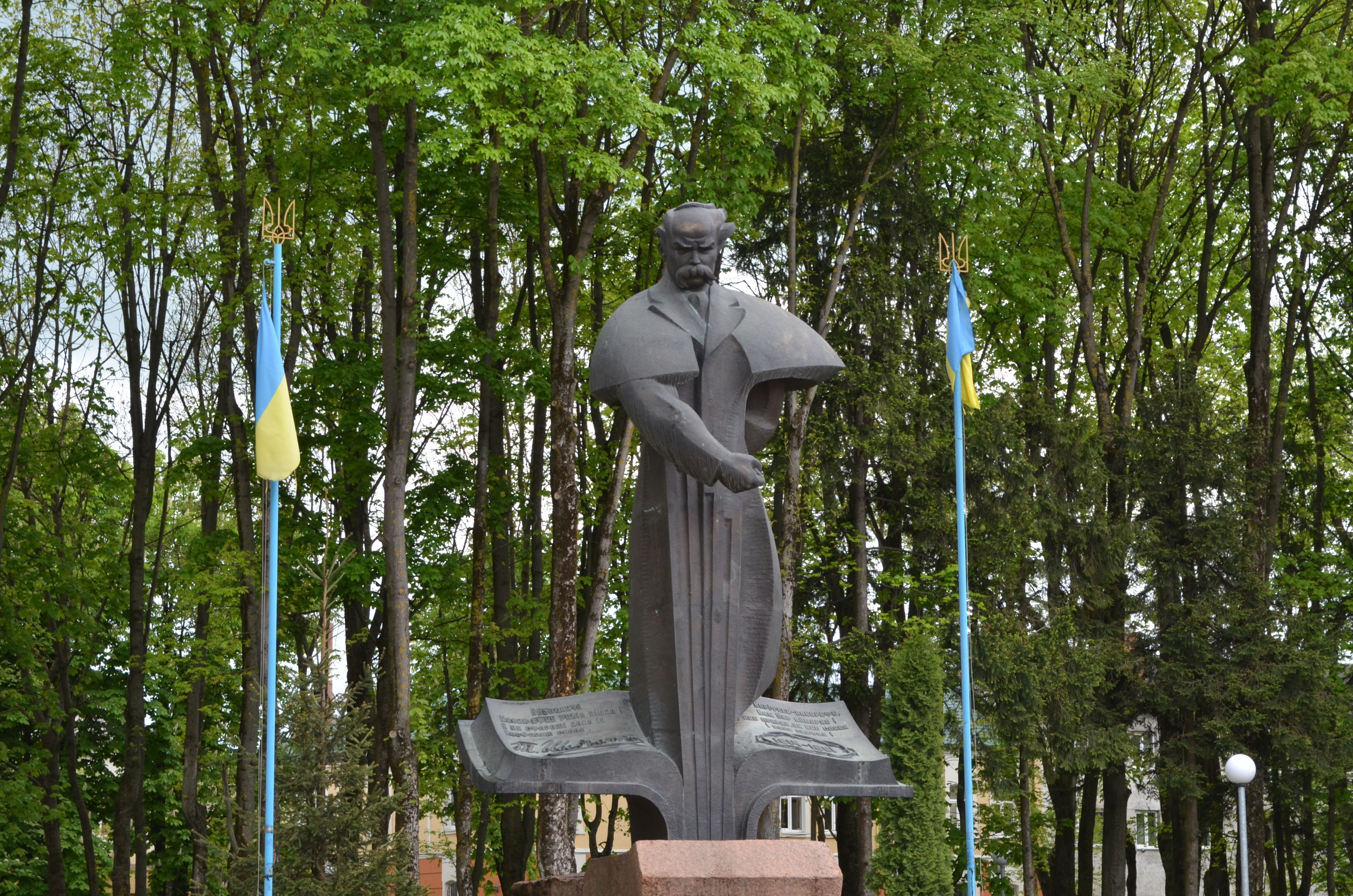
Mykolaiv Monument to Shevchenko

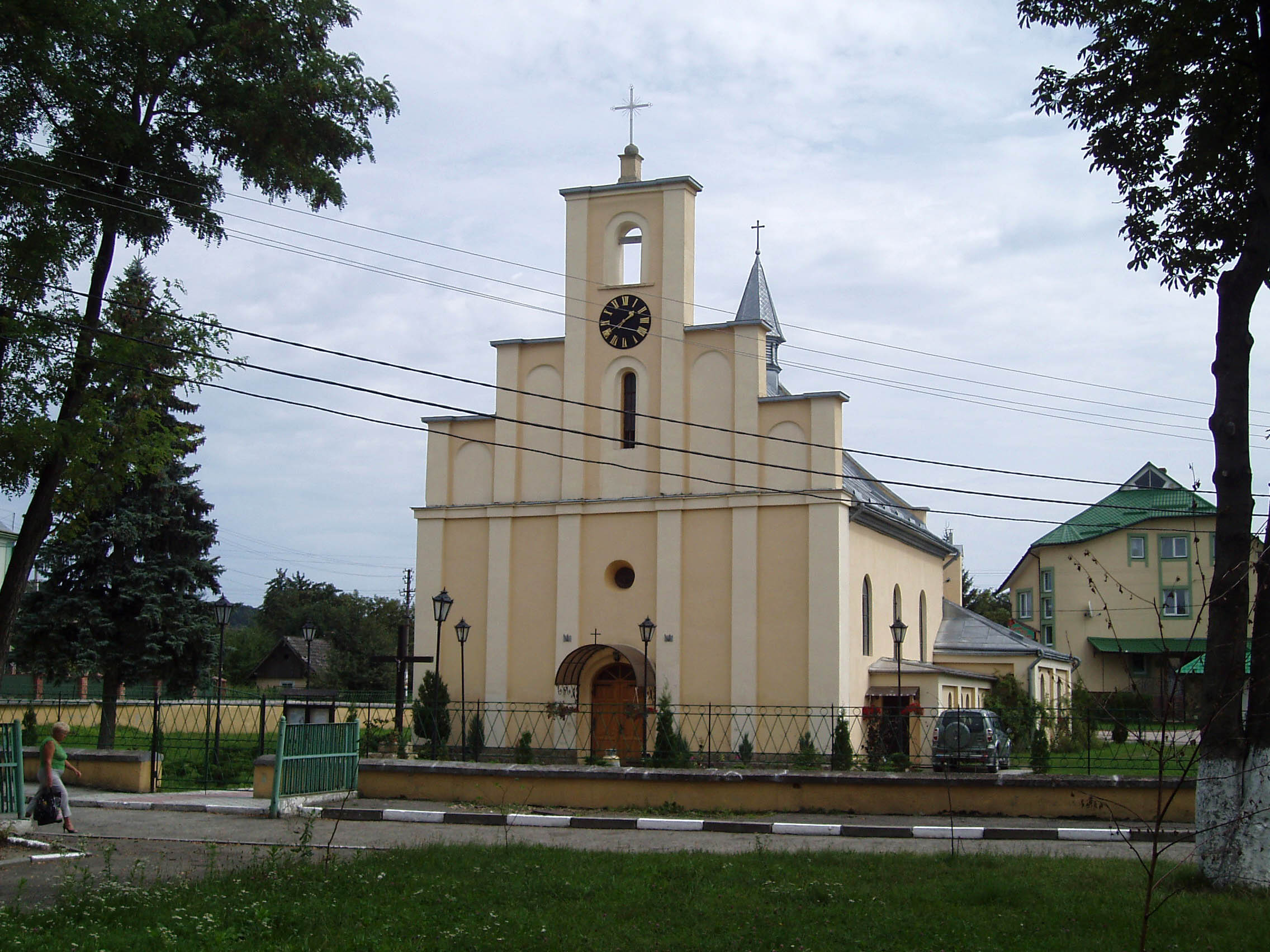
Church of Saint Nicholas

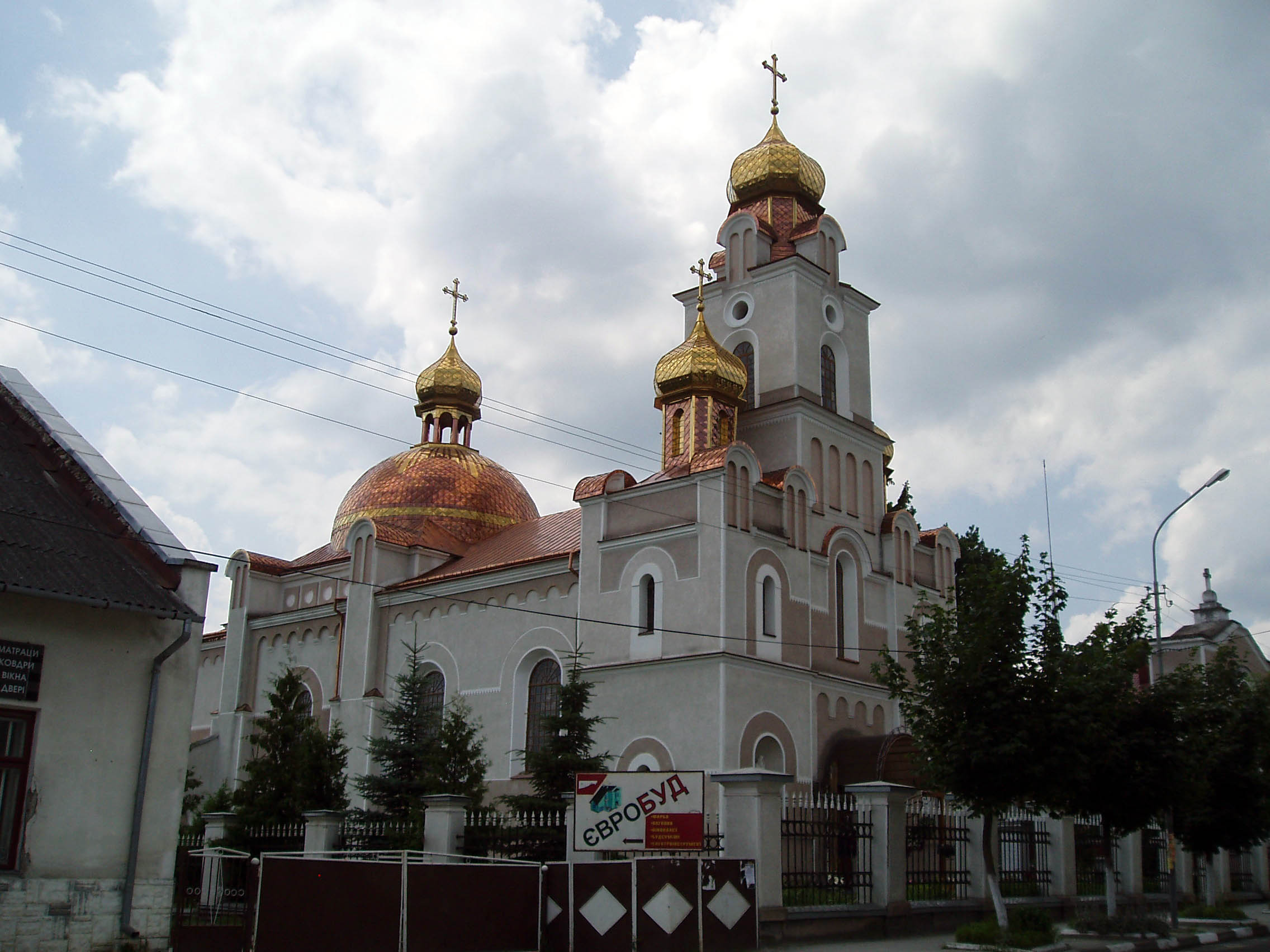
Church of Saint Nicholas (Greek Catholic)

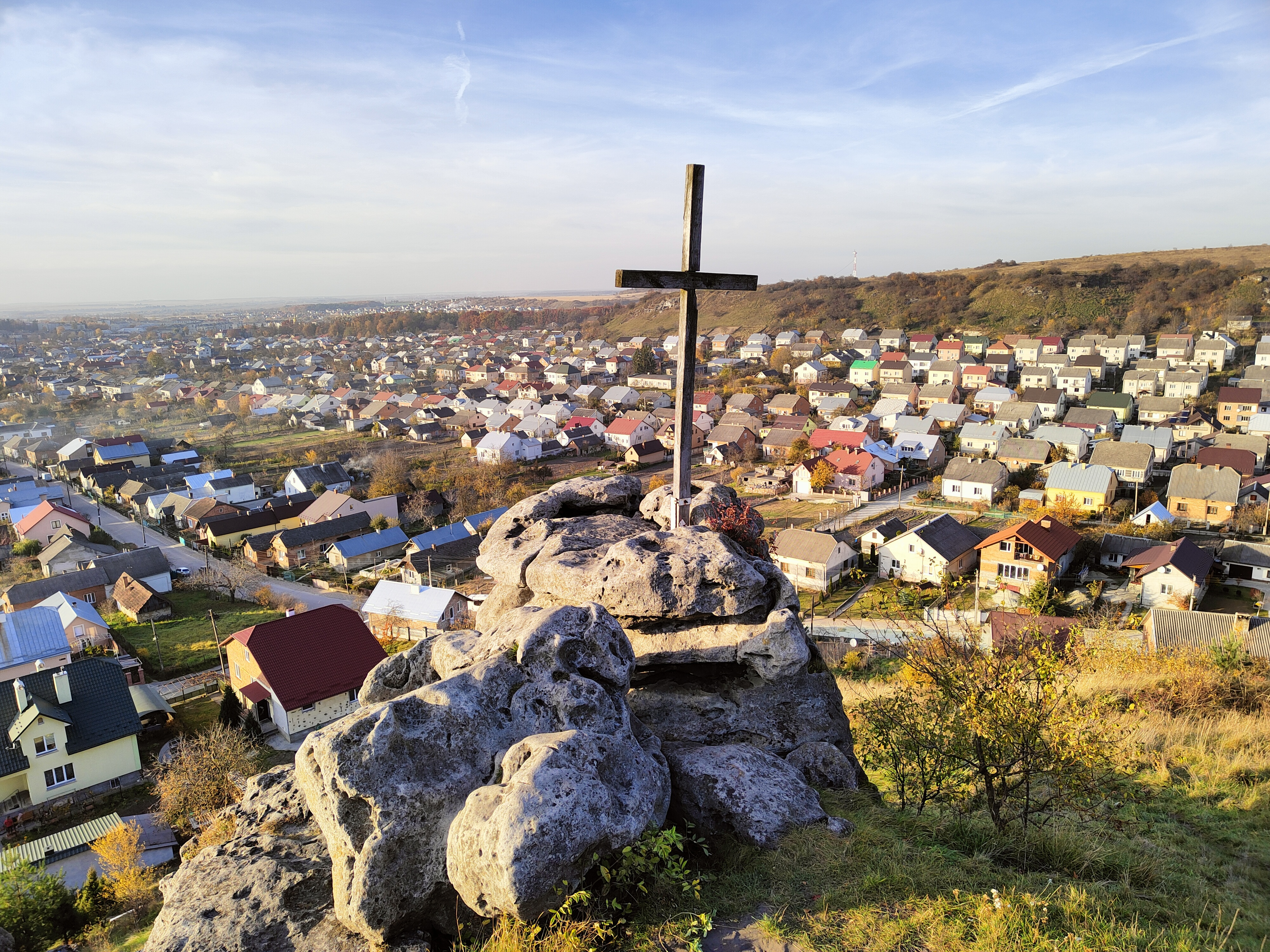
Mykolaiv Tall

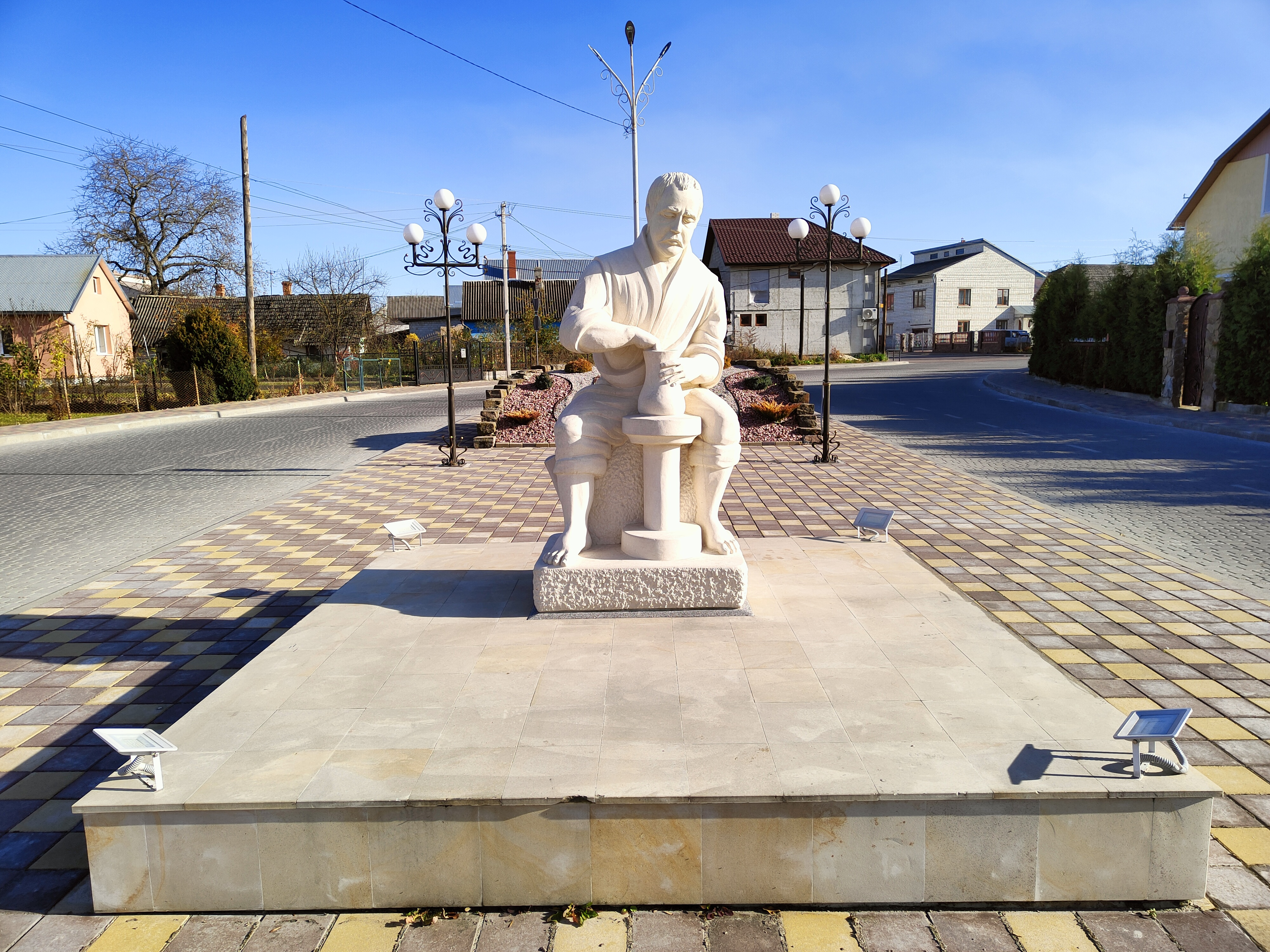
Mykolaiv monument to the potter

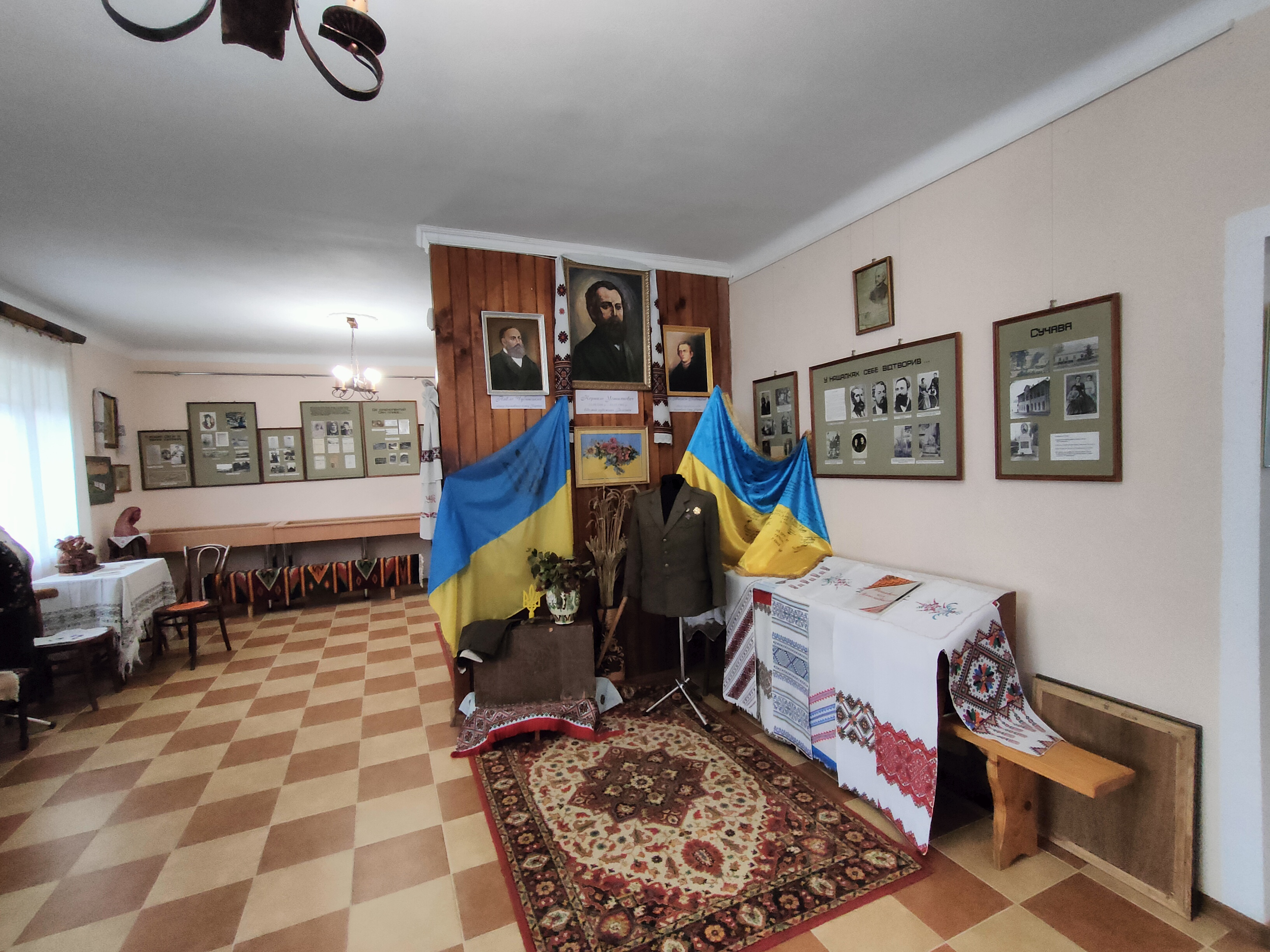
Exposition of the museum of U. Kravchenko and M. Ustyanovych

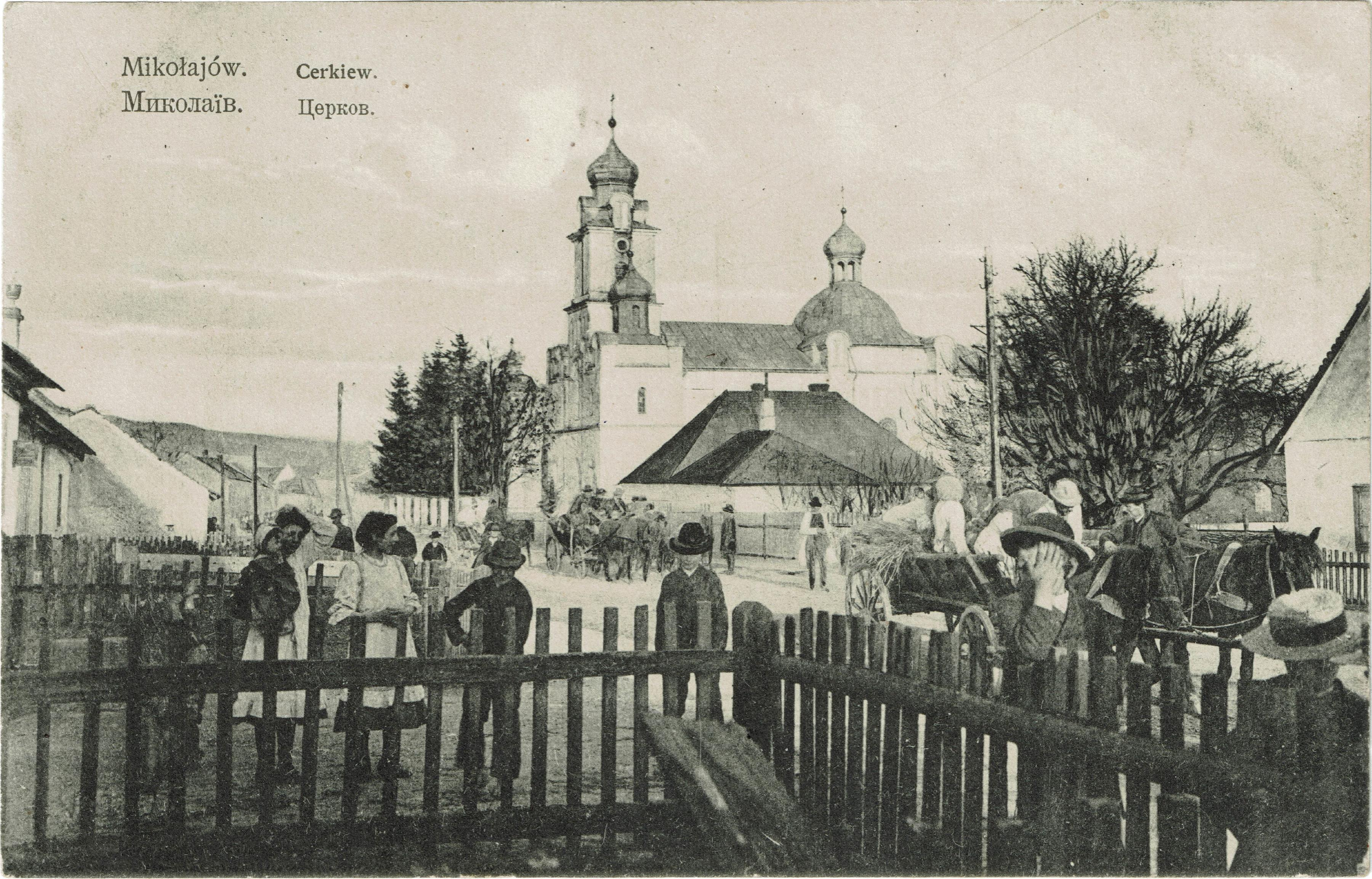
The old view of the city in 1908-1912

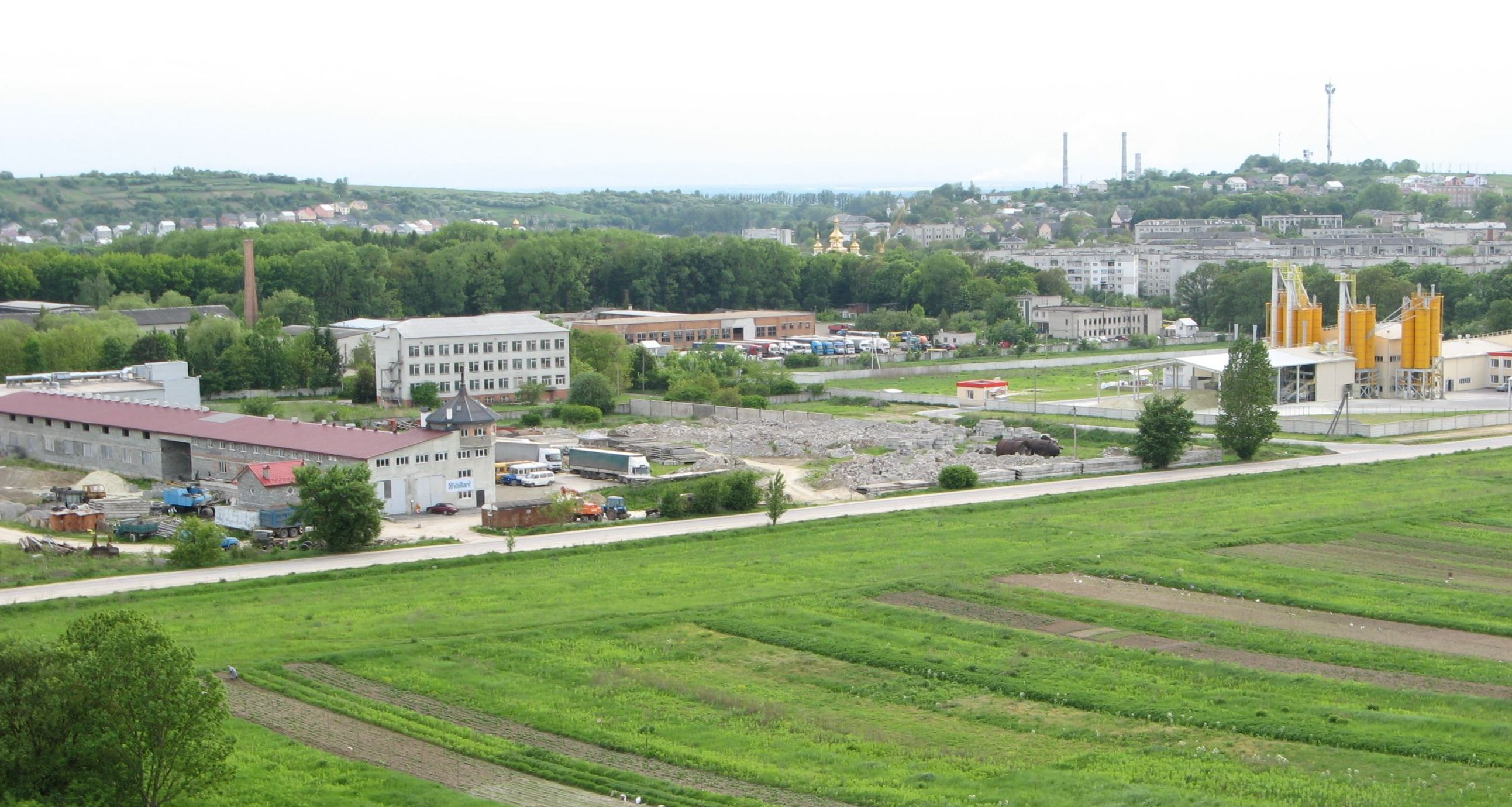
Mykolaiv

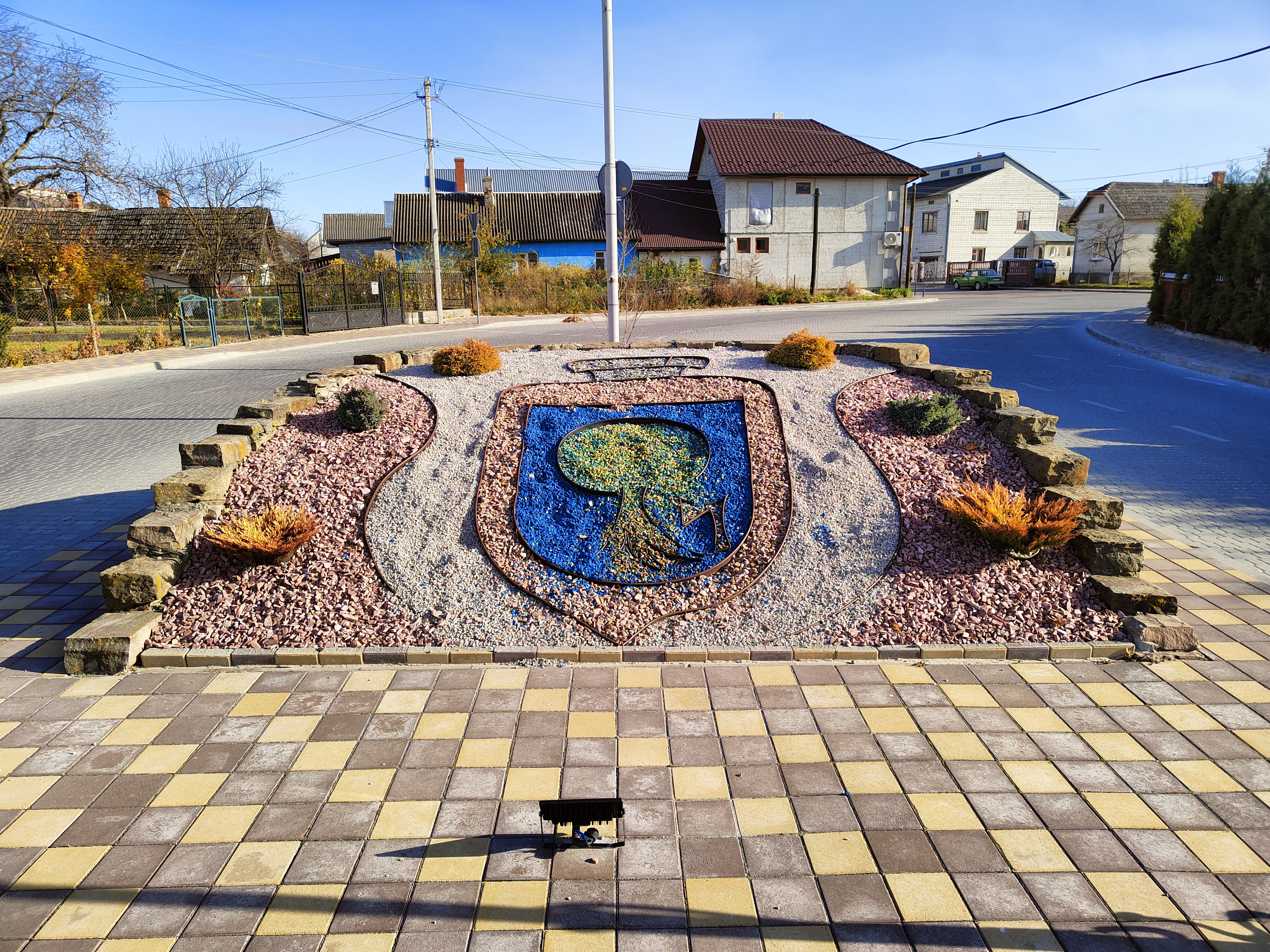
Coat of arms of the city of Mykolaiv
