= Roman Lozynskyi =

Ukrainian politician

- Роман Лозинський
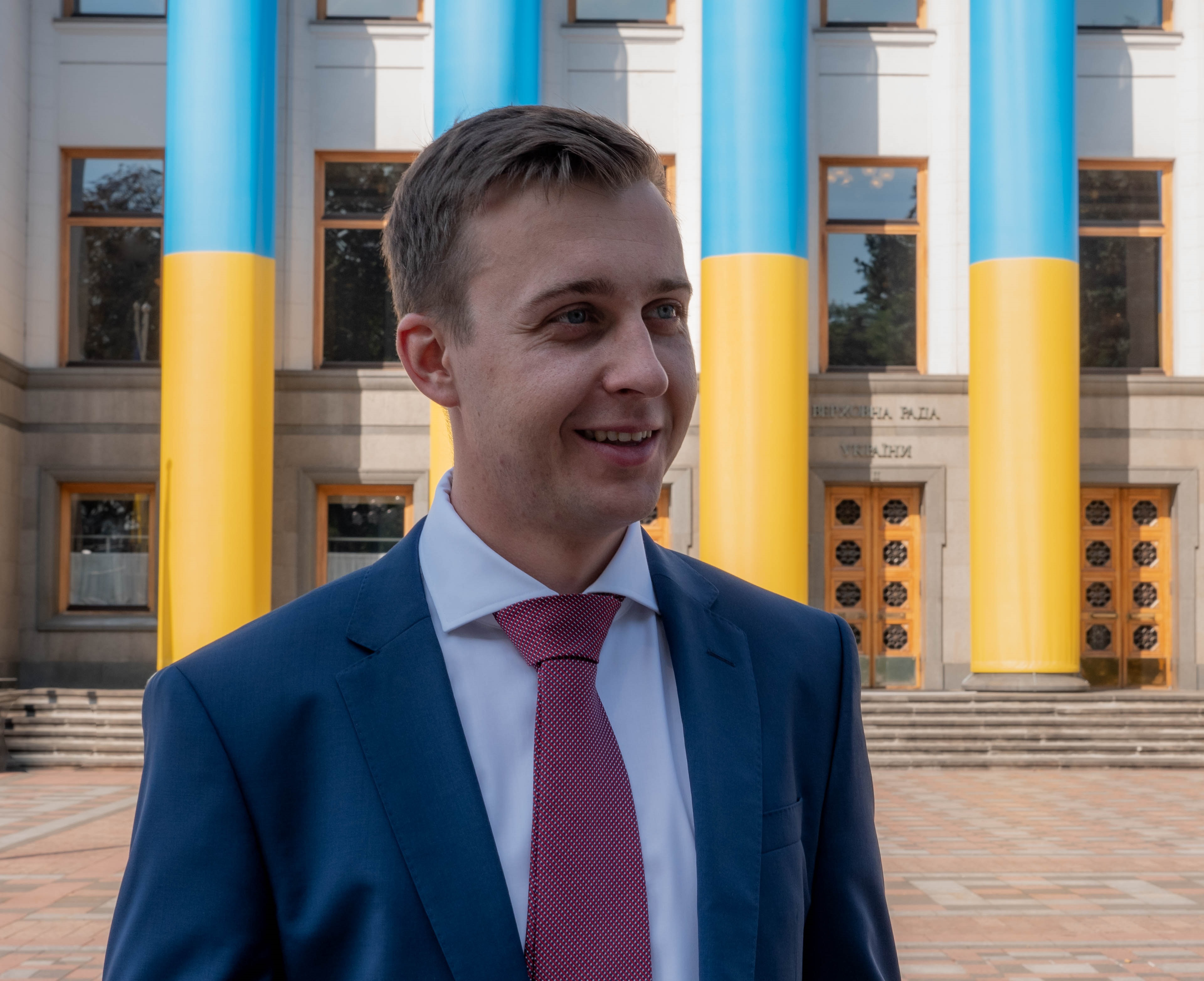

People's Deputy of Ukraine
- Incumbent
- Assumed office 29 August 2019
- Constituency: Holos, No. 15

Personal details
- Born: 20 January 1994 (age 31); Lviv, Ukraine
- Education: University of Lviv and Ukrainian Catholic University
- Occupation: political scientist

Roman Mykhailovych Lozynskyi (Ukrainian: Роман Михайлович Лозинський; born 20 January 1994) is a Ukrainian politician and public figure, People's Deputy of Ukraine, First Deputy Head of the Committee on Service, Local Self-Government, Regional Development and Urban Planning of the Verkhovna Rada of Ukraine (Ukraine's parliament), a member of Euronest Parliamentary Assembly. A former chairman of the Ukrainian Galician Party and a former member of the "Holos" ("Voice") political party. On 29 July 2021 Voice expelled Lozynskyi from the party.

In addition to his political career, he is a member of such public organizations as Plast, a national scout organization of Ukraine, and Running Ukraine, triathlete, marathon runner, сo-founder of the educational project "Young Elite School" in Lviv.

== Education ==
He studied at a specialized school №28 with an in-depth study of the German language in Lviv.

In 2015, he graduated from Ivan Franko National University of Lviv, in Political science, and received a bachelor’s degree.

In the same year, he successfully passed the program "Political Studies: everything a future deputy needs to know" at the Institute of Leadership and Management of the Ukrainian Catholic University.

In 2016, he completed the Higher Political School program at the Centre of Political Studies and Analytics in Kyiv.

In 2017, he received a master's degree (MPA) from the School of Public Administration of the Ukrainian Catholic University.

== Political activity ==
In 2015, as a student, Lozynskyi joined the Ukrainian Galician Party.

In the 2015 Ukrainian local elections, Lozynskyi ran for the Lviv City Council of the 7th convocation from the Ukrainian Galician Party in constituency 46. He was not elected. He took second place in his district with a rating of 8.9%. In the intra-party rating, he took the 7th place out of 41.

Since 2015, Lozynskyi is an Assistant to the Deputy of the Lviv City Council Yulia Hvozdovych, Chairman of the Commission on Legality, Deputy Activity, and Freedom of Speech.

In 2016, Lozynskyi did an internship in the office of Borys Wrzesnewskyj, a member of the three convocations of the House of Commons of Canada from the Liberal Party.

2015-2017 — Deputy Chairman of the Lviv city organization Ukrainian Galician Party.

2017-2018 — Deputy Chairman of the Ukrainian Galician Party and head of the party secretariat. As a deputy, Roman Lozynskyi introduced expert groups in the party — special commissions that professionally investigate key issues to eliminate populism.

In March 2018, he became chairman of the Political Council of the Ukrainian Galician Party.

In the summer of 2019 the Ukrainian Galician Party and the Voice agreed to cooperate in the framework of the parliamentary campaign. In the 2019 Ukrainian parliamentary election he was the coordinator of the Voice party in the Lviv region.

On August 29, 2019, Roman Lozynskyi became a People's Deputy of Ukraine (number 15 in the Voice`s party list).

In April 2020 he launched a campaign demanding the continuation of blocking Russian social networks in Ukraine (such a VKontakte, Odnoklassniki, Mail.ru, etc.). On May 13 he collected the signatures of 156 people's deputies for holding an extraordinary sitting of the Verkhovna Rada to adopt a resolution on continuing to block social networks. On the same day, the Verkhovna Rada voted 252 deputies in favor of draft Resolution # 3319 on the extension of sanctions. The next day, the President of Ukraine signed a decree, which extended the sanctions and, accordingly, the blocking of Russian social networks in Ukraine by Internet providers.

At the end of August 2020 Russia imposed sanctions on Roman Lozynskyi.

In June 2021, 11 Voice MPs formed a breakaway group called Justice (Ukrainian: Справедливість; Spravedlyvist), among them all (so also Lozynskyi) Ukrainian Galician Party members.

On 29 July 2021, Voice expelled Lozynskyi from the party, the party claimed he could not be part in their "political force in the future".

== Military career ==
In October 2021, Lozynskyi signed a contract with the Special Operations Forces’ 73rd Naval Center. On March 7, 2022, after the start of the full-scale Russian invasion of Ukraine, he voluntarily mobilized and served in the Armed Forces. He fought in the southern direction and was among the soldiers who liberated Kherson in November 2022.
