= Krzysztof Łoziński =

Polish activist and journalist

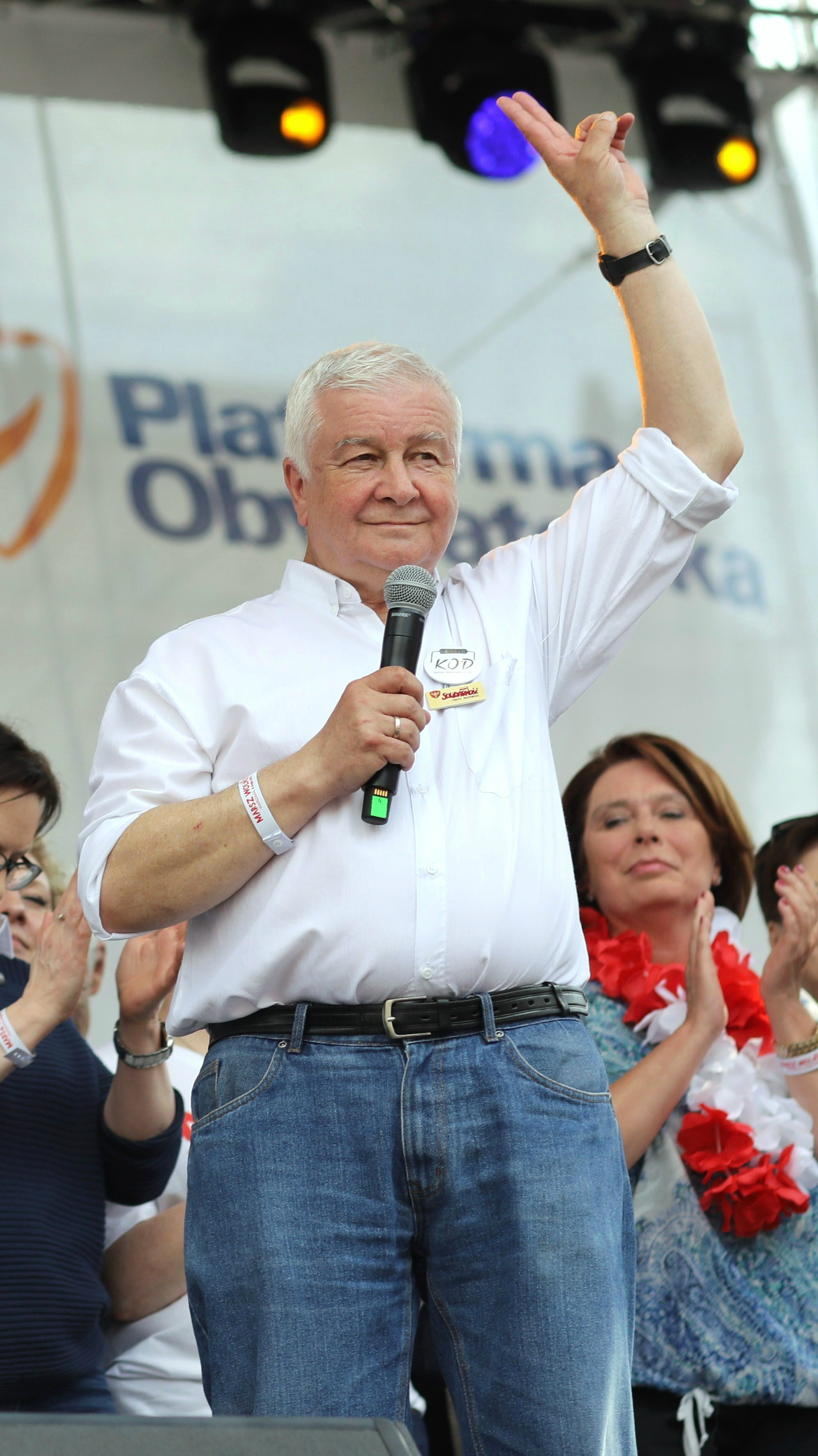
- Born: 16 July 1948 (age 78); Warsaw, Poland
- Occupations: Writer, opinion journalist, mountaineer
- Known for: Necessity to establish KOD

Krzysztof Łoziński (born 16 July 1948) is a Polish writer, publicist, alpinist, teacher and anti-communist opposition activist in Polish People's Republic.

Krzysztof Łoziński was born in Warsaw on 16 July 1948. He was the son of Danuta, a doctor, and Jerzy, an architect. In 1967 he graduated from Liceum Ogólnokształcące im. Tadeusza Czackiego (Tadeusz Czacki High School) in Warsaw. In 1967–1968 and from 1970 to 1976 he studied on Faculty of Mathematics and Mechanics, currently Faculty of Mathematics, Informatics and Mechanics, University of Warsaw. In March 1968 he was expelled from the university for collecting the signatures against the ban stage play of Dziady at National Theatre in Warsaw and called to compulsory military service. Between 1976 and 1979 he was a physics teacher at Liceum Zawodowe im. Emiliana Konopczyńskiego (Emilian Konopczyński High School) in Warsaw. From 1980 to 1982 he worked in the workshop at Teatr Wielki in Warsaw.

In 1976 Łoziński started collaboration with KOR (Workers' Defence Committee, and later on with Committee for Social Self-defence KOR. In September 1980 he became a chairman of Solidarność at Teatr Wielki. He also organized and was the head of The Trades Union of Theatre's Workers Polish: Sekcja Branżowa Pracowników Teatrów in the Mazovia Region. He took part in preparations for the Solidarity Mazovia Region to go underground. Between 1982 and 1989 he supervised the Solidarity resistance groups. He was arrested on 8 June 1982 and sentenced to 1.5-year of imprisonment by District Court in Warsaw on 20 January 1983. He was released from prison after his appeal hearing in February 1983. Until 1989 he was harassed by SB (Security Service), including multiple interrogations, arrests and searches.

In the late 1980s Łoziński lived in Afghanistan, India and Singapore. From 1989 he was cooperating with Amnesty International. In 2004, together with Stefan Bratkowski, Andrzej W. Pawluczuk and Piotr Rachtan, he established a fortnightly internet magazine "Kantrateksty" which he subsequently ran as chief editor until 2014.

Łoziński is also an alpinist, with approximately 300 solo mountaineer over 60 new climbs in Tatry. He took part, on some occasions, as a member and was also the head of few expeditions to Hindu Kush and the Himalaya Mountains where they either ascended for the first time or established new routes. He led a martial arts school teaching Hung Ga Kung Fu style for 20 years.

Łoziński is an author and co-author of many press publications and books. Two of his works received particular attention. The critics of Wiesław Binienda was widely discussed and the second one, suggesting the creation of Democracy Defence Committee, KOD produced a large response on the internet and press. Łoziński became one of the founders of KOD on 2 December 2015.
