= Ludwik Kubala =

Polish historian

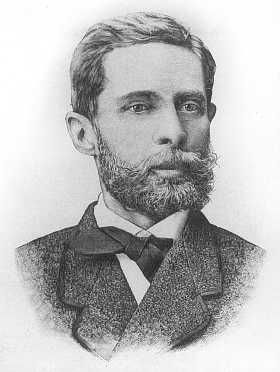
Ludwik Kubala

Ludwik Kubala (9 September 1838 in Kamienica - 30 September 1918 in Lwów) was a Polish historian. Lived in Kraków and Lwów, fought in the January Uprising. In 1880-1881 he published a historical treaty that is said to have inspired Henryk Sienkiewicz to create The Trilogy. In addition to historical works, he wrote poems, plays and edited newspapers. He was also a gymnasium teacher.
