= Karol Szajnocha =

Polish writer and historian

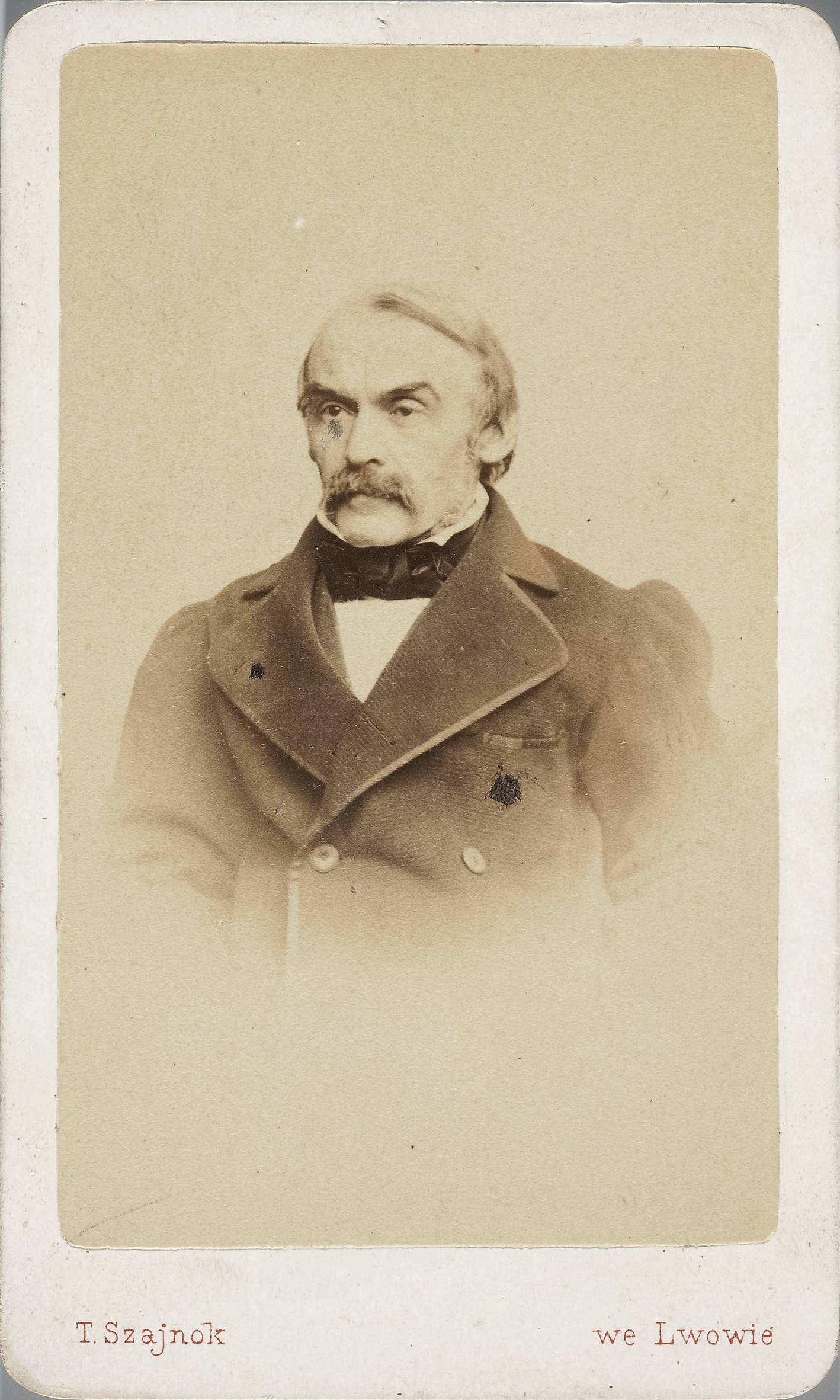
- Born: 20 November 1818; Komarno, Austrian Galicia
- Died: 10 January 1868 (aged 49); Lwów, Galicia
- Occupations: Writer, historian

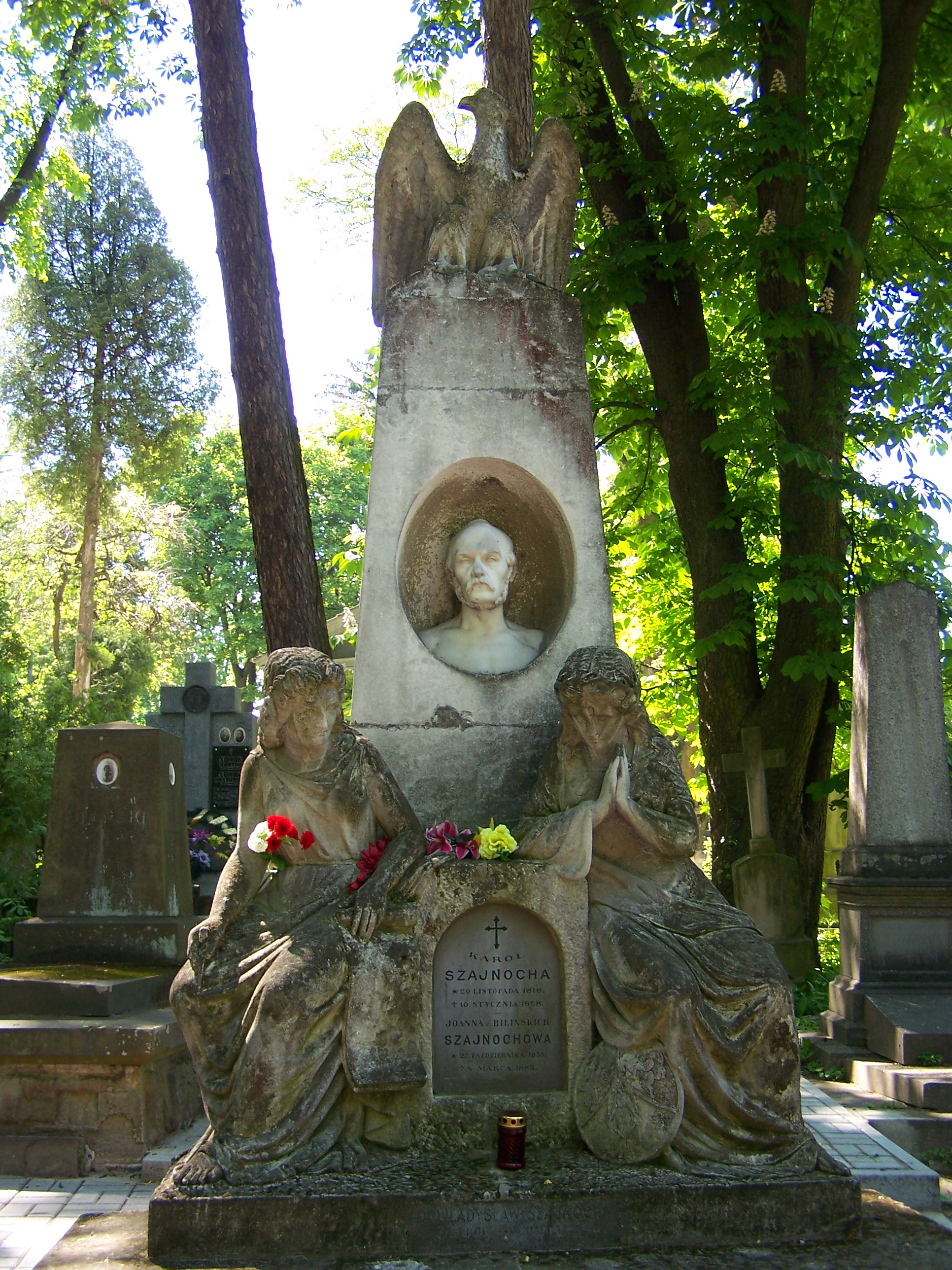
Tomb of Karol Szajnocha and his family. Łyczakowski Cemetery in Lviv (Ukraine).

Karol Szajnocha (20 November 1818 – 10 January 1868) was a Polish writer, historian, and independence activist. Self-taught, he would nonetheless become a notable Polish historian of the partitions period.

== Biography ==
Karol Szajnocha was born on 20 November 1818 in Komarno, son of Polonized Czech Vaclav Scheinoha Vtelenský of Austrian origin, who signed himself as Scheinoha Wtelensky in Poland and Maria Łozińska.

Karol attended schools in Sambor and Lwów; in that period Szajnocha adopted the polonized version of his name (gradually changing his signature from Scheynoha de Wtellensky, to Szejnoha de Wtellensky, to Szajnocha).

In 1834 while in gymnasium he founded a secret society, "Society of the Ancient Times" (Towarzystwo Starożytności), dedicated to collecting information on the historical monuments of the partitioned Polish–Lithuanian Commonwealth and inspired by the Philomath Student Movement. The society was discovered and closed by the authorities and Szajnocha received a mild punishment. In 1835 he entered the University of Lwów, philosophical department. In 1836 he was found guilty of spreading pro-Polish and anti-government leaflets and poems (on the anniversary of the recent November uprising); he was imprisoned from January of that year till mid-1837 and for the first several months he was locked in a single cell without any light. For activism related to Polish pro-independence movement he was also expelled from university and forbidden to reenlist. He continued his education unofficially (he was mostly self-taught), although later he would receive some help from his mentor, August Bielowski), concentrating first on linguistics (he started in prison where by reading grammar books he learned the English language), later on literature and history.

Szajnocha became a private tutor as well as journalist and an editor of several important Polish publications in Lwów (he was connected, amongst others, to Dziennik Mod Paryskich, Tygodnik Polski, Rozmaitości, and Dziennik Literacki). In 1838 he joined a new secret organization, Sarmacja. While pro-Polish it was moderate in its views and argued against an armed struggle. In 1839 he first published his own literary works; he wrote poems, novels, dramas and historical essays as well as translate (primarily from Serbian language). Around 1847 his vision started to worsen and was advised by medical doctors to limit the amount of writing and reading; he rejected their advice. By that time his fame had grown and twice (in 1850 and 1862) he was offered a position at the Jagiellonian University, which he refused. Beginning in 1853, he worked in the Ossolineum Institute, which helped him to publish some of his works. In 1855 he married Joanna Bilińska.

In 1860 he became completely blind (he already had major problems reading since 1856) but would not give up reading and writing – he would listen to a lector and dictate his works as well as write himself with the aid of a device he designed himself (although eventually rheumatism would prevent him from that). On 10 January 1868 he died in Lwów and later buried in the Łyczakowski Cemetery. His funeral was well known and attended by many and seen as a Polish patriotic manifestation.

== Works ==
He is remembered mostly for his contributions as a historian. His first academic work, Pogląd na ogół dziejów polskich, was published in 1847. He wrote many works, on Polish kings Bolesław Chrobry (1849), Władysław Łokietek (between 1849 and 1854), Władysław Jagiełło (Jogaila) and Queen Jadwiga of Poland (1855–1856), Kazimierz the Great, marshal, hetman, voivode, and magnate Jerzy Sebastian Lubomirski and others (Szkice historyczne (1854—1869), Dwa lata dziejow naszych, 1646 i1648 (1865–1869), Obrazy lechickie, Śmierc Czarnieckiego, Obyczaje pierwotnych Słowian). He was also one of the initiators of work on and the publisher of the Monumenta Poloniae Historica (published from 1864 to 1893), a six-tome compilation of important primary sources related to history of Poland.

He was recognized by his contemporaries, both Polish speaking and foreign, as a major historian of Poland. His works became known outside the academic circles, and were reportedly read, among others, by the future Nobel Prize winning Polish author Henryk Sienkiewicz. His most notable work "Jadwiga i Jagiełło, 1374—1413" (first edition 1855–1856; second updated edition 1861) was praised in Encyclopædia Britannica 1911 edition as a "great monograph, justly described as a pearl of historical literature... the result of twelve years of exhaustive study... our best authority on the first union between Poland and Lithuania."
