= List of cities in Lviv Oblast =

Location of cities in Lviv Oblast

There are 44 populated places in Lviv Oblast, Ukraine, that have been officially granted city status (Ukrainian: місто, romanized: misto) by the Verkhovna Rada, the country's parliament. Settlements with more than 10,000 people are eligible for city status, although the status is typically also granted to settlements of historical or regional importance. As of 5 December 2001, the date of the first and only official census in the country since independence, (Note: As of 11 July 2023) the most populous city in the oblast was the regional capital, Lviv, with a population of 732,818 people, while the least populous city was Uhniv, with 974 people. In 2024, following the passage of derussification laws, the city of Chervonohrad was renamed Sheptytskyi. The center of the city of Lviv and two wooden churches in Drohobych and Zhovkva are also among the eight World Heritage Sites in Ukraine recognized by UNESCO.

From independence in 1991 to 2020, nine cities in the oblast were designated as cities of regional significance (municipalities), which had self-government under city councils, while the oblast's remaining 35 cities were located in 20 raions (districts) as cities of district significance, which are subordinated to the governments of the raions. On 18 July 2020, an administrative reform abolished and merged the oblast's raions and cities of regional significance into seven new, expanded raions. The seven raions that make up the oblast are Drohobych, Lviv, Sambir, Sheptytskyi, Stryi, Yavoriv, and Zolochiv.

== List of cities ==
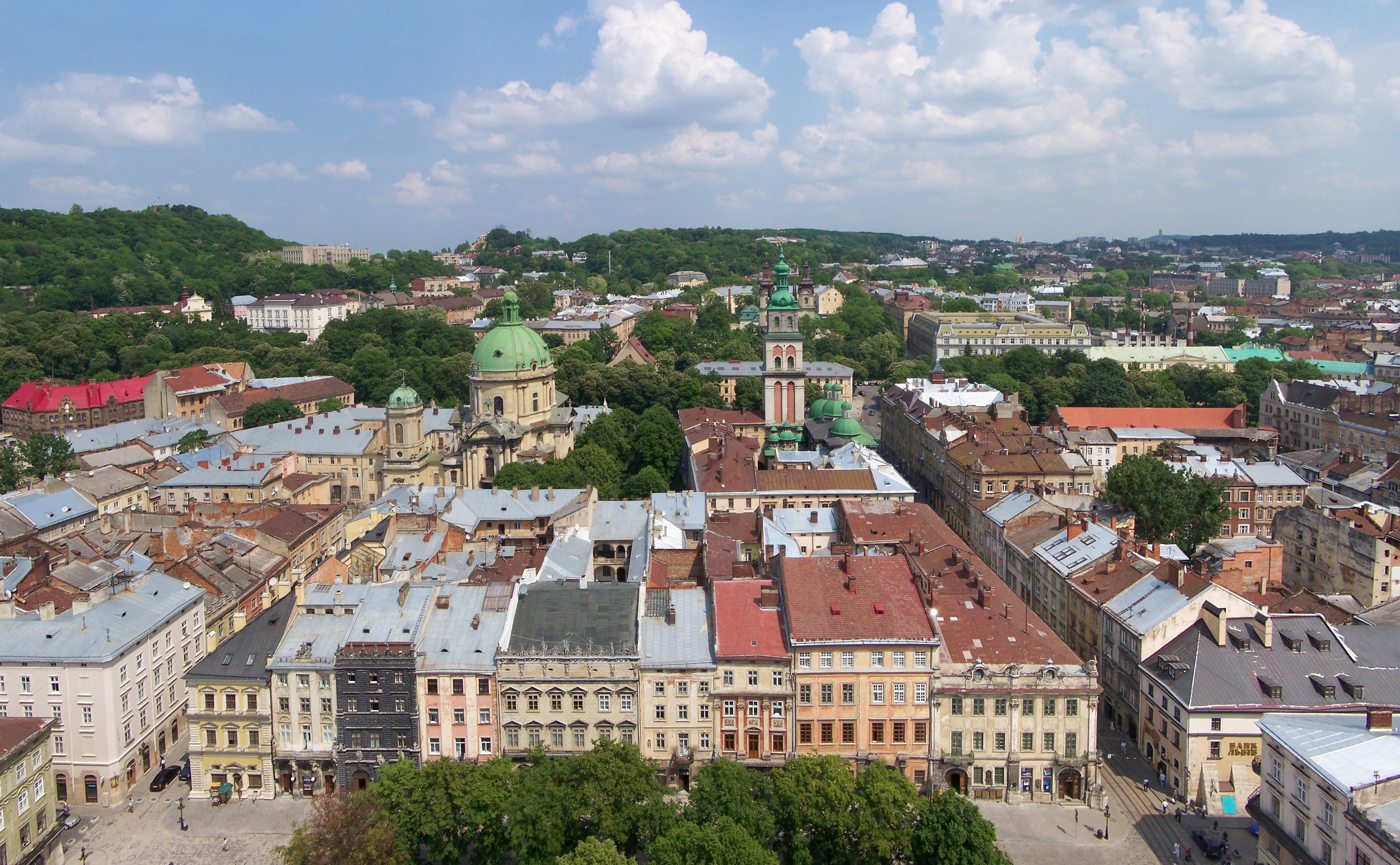
Lviv, capital and most populous city in Lviv Oblast

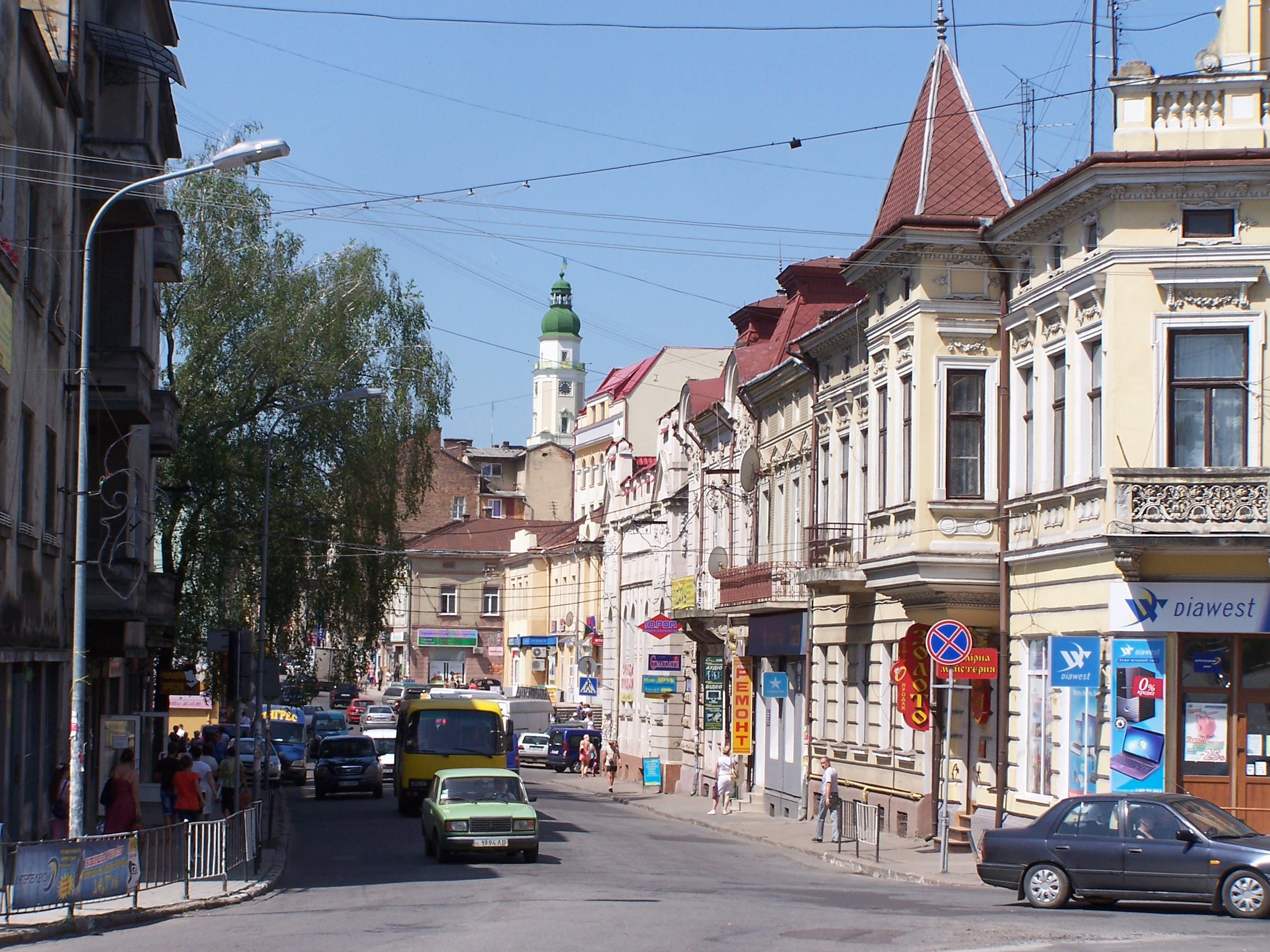
Drohobych, the oblast's second most populous city and a major oil extraction center

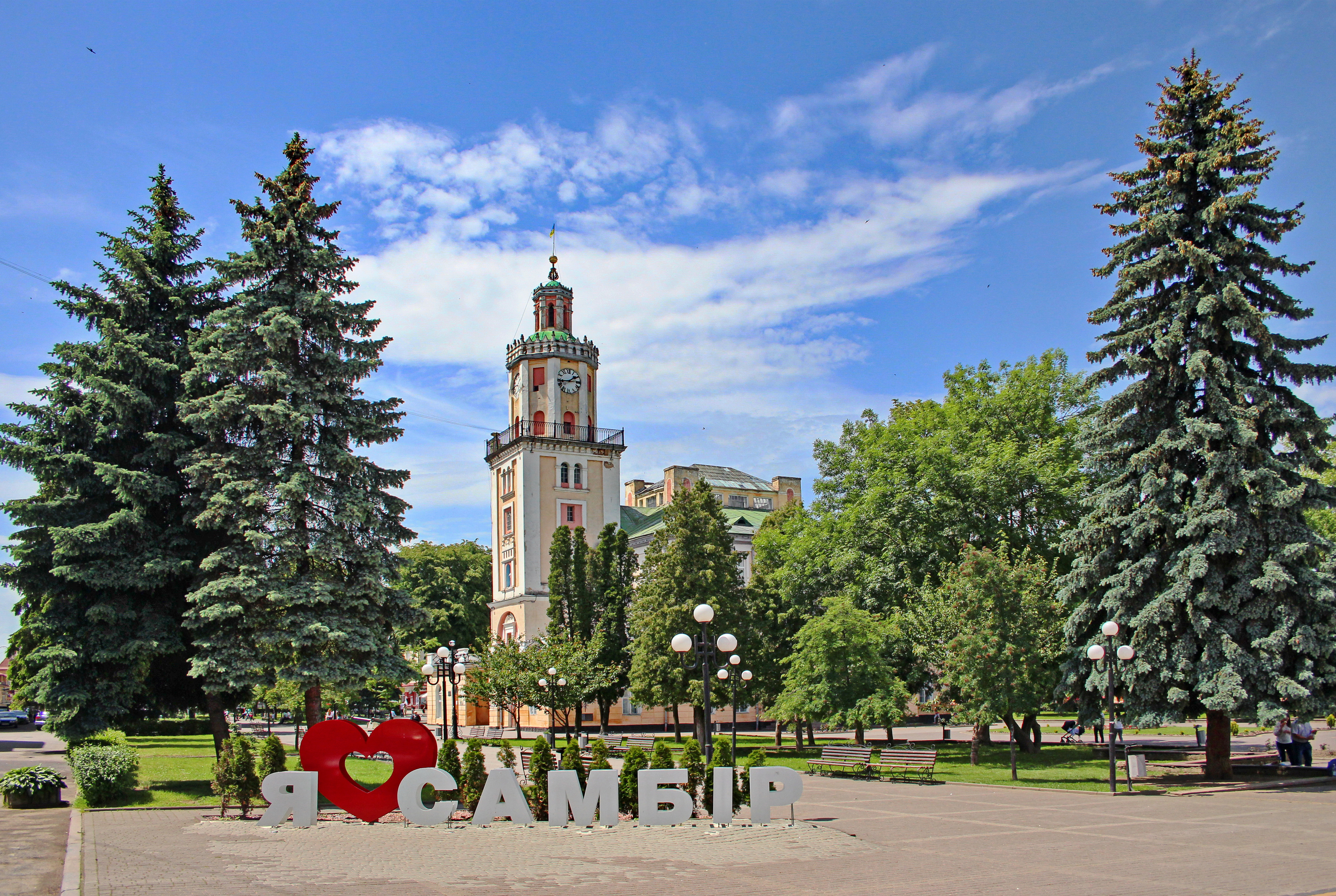
Sambir, the fifth largest city in the oblast

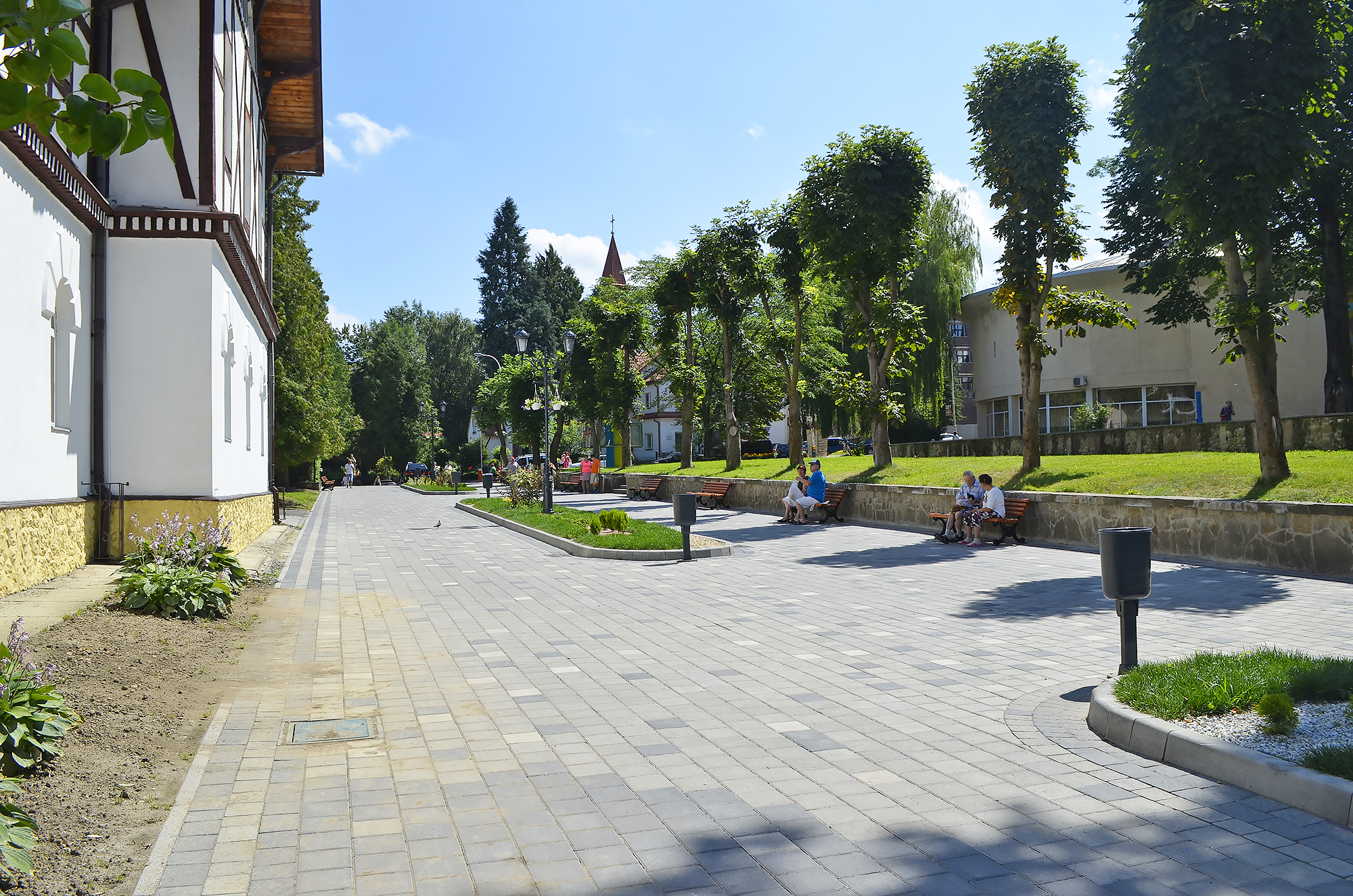
Truskavets, a resort town known for its mineral springs

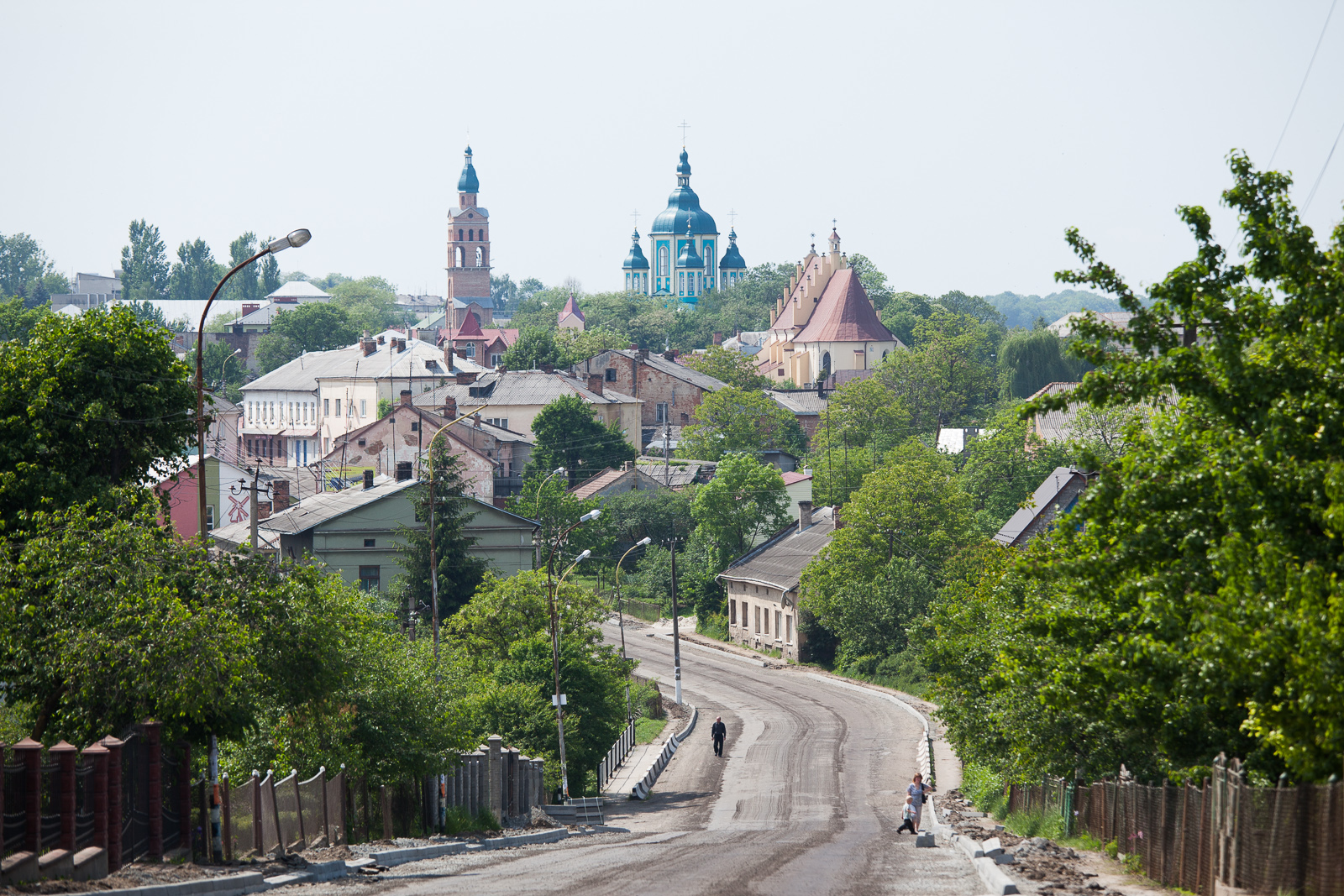
Mostyska, one of the main centers of the Polish minority in Ukraine

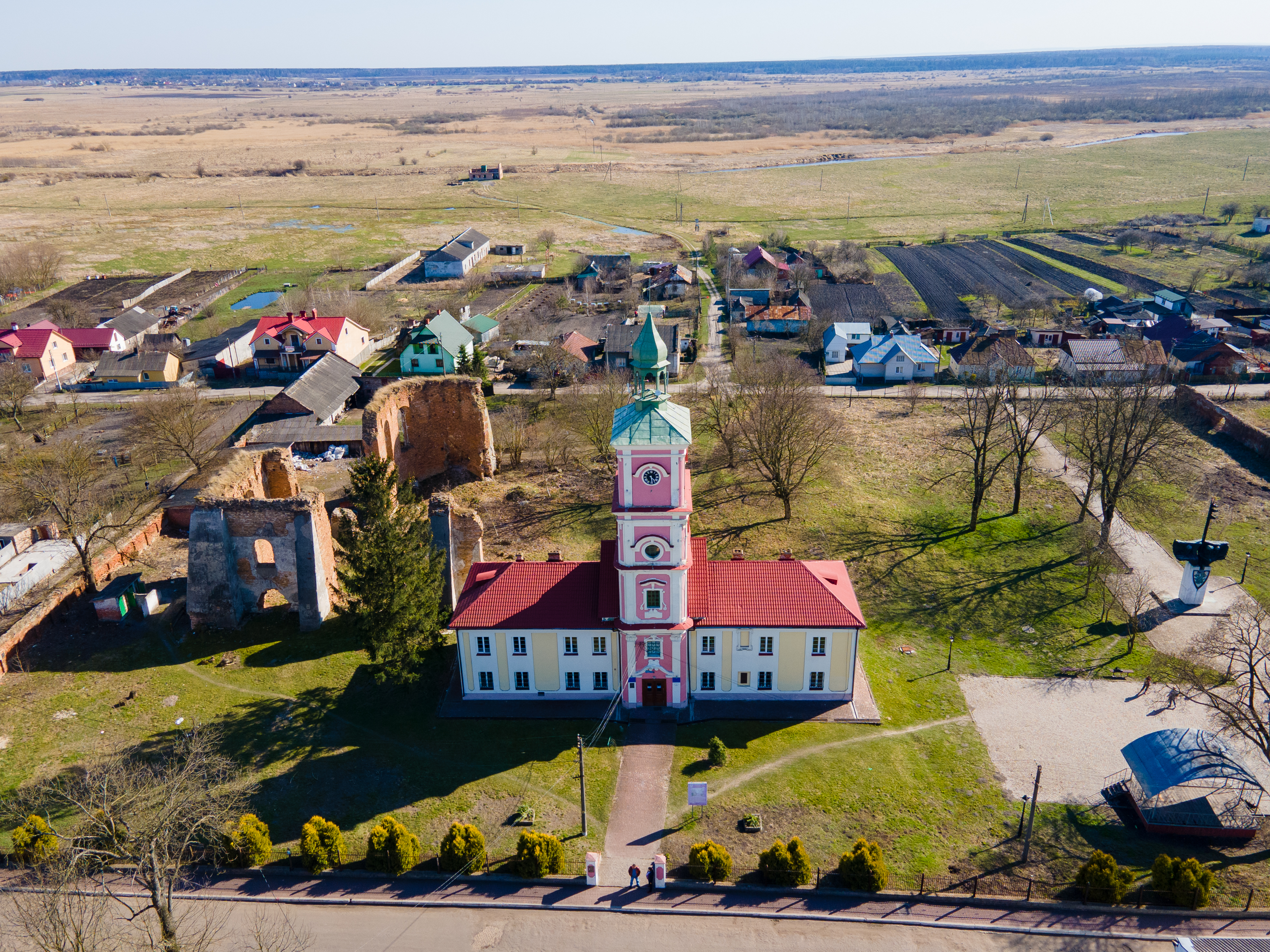
Belz, second least populated city in the oblast and historically a regional center

Cities in Lviv Oblast
Name	Name (in Ukrainian) (Note: Links to the Ukrainian Wikipedia articles for each city)	Raion (district)	Population (2022 estimates)	Population (2001 census)	Population change
Belz	Белз	Sheptytskyi	2,191	2,478	−11.58%
Bibrka	Бібрка	Lviv	3,761	3,980	−5.50%
Boryslav	Борислав	Drohobych	32,473	38,122	−14.82%
Brody	Броди	Zolochiv	23,134	23,239	−0.45%
Busk	Буськ	Zolochiv	8,662	8,673	−0.13%
Dobromyl	Добромиль	Sambir	4,111	4,976	−17.38%
Drohobych	Дрогобич	Drohobych	73,682	79,119	−6.87%
Dubliany	Дубляни	Lviv	9,748	8,469	+15.10%
Hlyniany	Глиняни	Lviv	2,954	3,378	−12.55%
Horodok	Городок	Lviv	16,085	16,082	+0.02%
Kamianka-Buzka	Кам'янка-Бузька	Lviv	10,397	11,674	−10.94%
Khodoriv	Ходорів	Stryi	8,954	10,565	−15.25%
Khyriv	Хирів	Sambir	4,104	4,590	−10.59%
Komarno	Комарно	Lviv	3,653	3,994	−8.54%
Lviv	Львів	Lviv	717,273	732,818	−2.12%
Morshyn	Моршин	Stryi	5,562	6,482	−14.19%
Mostyska	Мостиська	Yavoriv	9,103	9,150	−0.51%
Mykolaiv	Миколаїв	Stryi	14,498	14,801	−2.05%
Novoiavorivsk	Новояворівськ	Yavoriv	31,366	26,483	+18.44%
Novyi Kalyniv	Новий Калинів	Sambir	4,243	3,582	+18.45%
Novyi Rozdil	Новий Розділ	Stryi	27,841	28,227	−1.37%
Peremyshliany	Перемишляни	Lviv	6,415	7,565	−15.20%
Pustomyty	Пустомити	Lviv	9,372	9,798	−4.35%
Radekhiv	Радехів	Sheptytskyi	9,680	9,230	+4.88%
Rava-Ruska	Рава-Руська	Lviv	8,494	8,070	+5.25%
Rudky	Рудки	Sambir	5,230	4,942	+5.83%
Sambir	Самбір	Sambir	34,152	36,556	−6.58%
Sheptytskyi	Шептицький	Sheptytskyi	64,297	70,568	−8.89%
Skole	Сколе	Stryi	6,054	6,742	−10.20%
Sokal	Сокаль	Sheptytskyi	20,373	21,693	−6.08%
Sosnivka	Соснівка	Sheptytskyi	10,712	11,889	−9.90%
Staryi Sambir	Старий Самбір	Sambir	6,440	5,706	+12.86%
Stebnyk	Стебник	Drohobych	20,200	20,863	−3.18%
Stryi	Стрий	Stryi	59,425	62,479	−4.89%
Sudova Vyshnia	Судова Вишня	Yavoriv	6,470	6,668	−2.97%
Truskavets	Трускавець	Drohobych	28,287	31,037	−8.86%
Turka	Турка	Sambir	6,925	7,681	−9.84%
Uhniv	Угнів	Sheptytskyi	939	974	−3.59%
Velyki Mosty	Великі Мости	Sheptytskyi	6,286	5,925	+6.09%
Vynnyky	Винники	Lviv	19,037	13,654	+39.42%
Yavoriv	Яворів	Yavoriv	12,785	13,510	−5.37%
Zhydachiv	Жидачів	Stryi	10,353	11,798	−12.25%
Zhovkva	Жовква	Lviv	13,852	13,474	+2.81%
Zolochiv	Золочів	Zolochiv	23,912	23,481	+1.84%

== See also ==
- List of cities in Ukraine
