= Church of the Translation of the Relics of Saint Nicholas, Nahuievychi =

Church in Lviv Oblast, Ukraine

Church of the Translation of the Relics of Saint Nicholas Церква Перенесення мощей Святого Отця Миколая
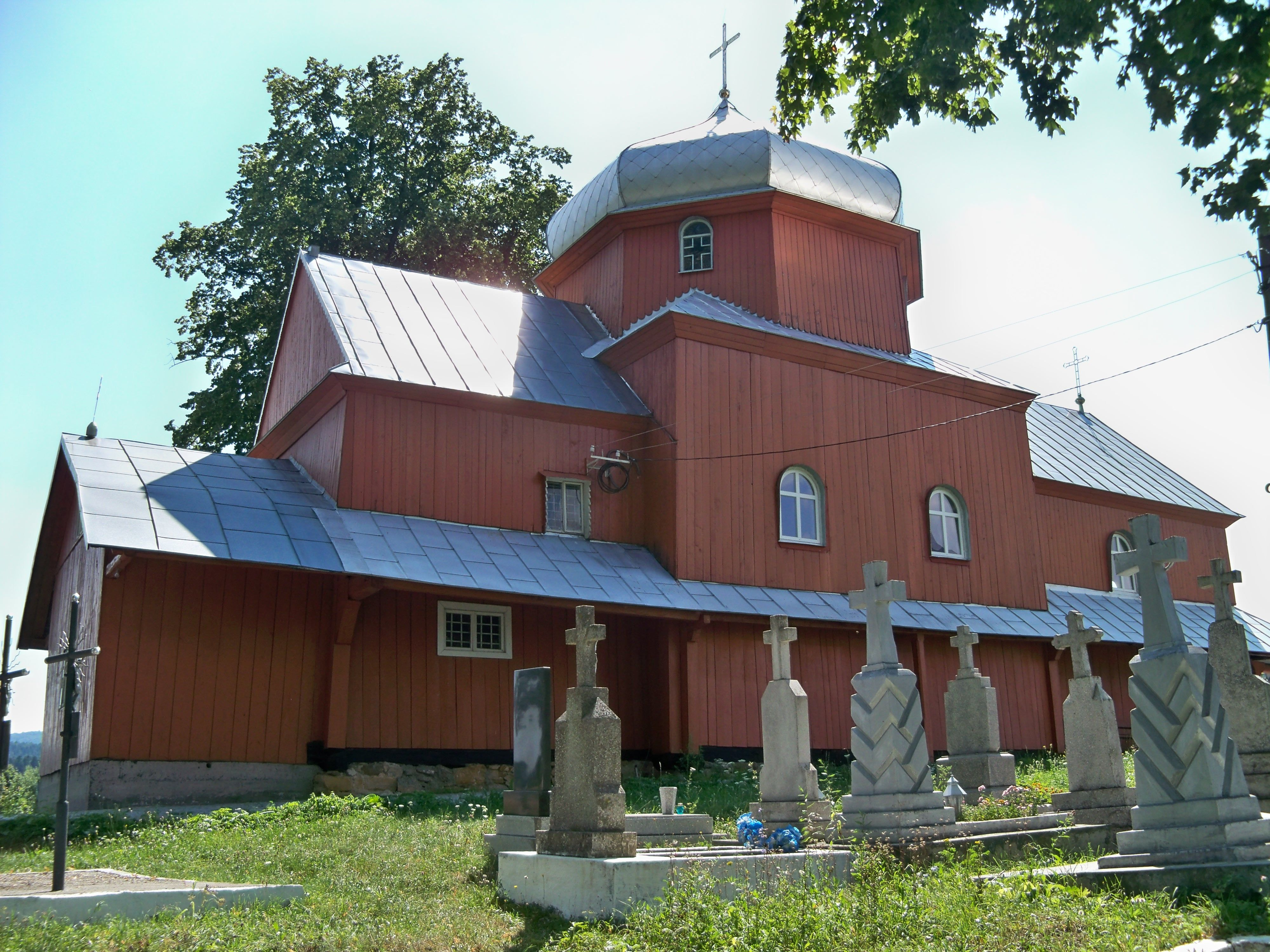

- Location within Lviv Oblast

Religion
- Affiliation: Ukrainian Greek Catholic Church

Location
- Location: Nahuievychi, Drohobych urban hromada, Drohobych Raion, Lviv Oblast, Ukraine
- Coordinates: 49°21′21″N 23°18′54″E

Architecture
- Completed: 1801

Church of the Translation of the Relics of Saint Nicholas (Ukrainian: Церква Перенесення мощей Святого Отця Миколая) is a Greek Catholic parish church (UGCC) in Nahuievychi of the Drohobych urban hromada, Drohobych Raion, Lviv Oblast, and an architectural monument of national importance.

== History ==
In 1780, the church in Verkhni Nahuievychi, which was then part of the Mokriany deanery, was mentioned. In 1650 and 1672, it received privileges from the Polish kings John II Casimir Vasa and Michał Korybut Wiśniowiecki.

In 1801, the present wooden church was built on the site of the ancient monastery. Until 1924, it was the main church, and then became a subsidiary of the church of Nyzhni Nahuievychi.

Under Soviet rule, the shrine was closed.

== Priests ==
- Stepan Kimakovych
- Mykola Vytoshynskyi ([1828]–1831+)
- Maksym Kolpachkevych (1831–1836, employee)
- Mykola Hrynevetskyi (1832–1844+)
- Yulian Yasenytskyi (1836–1843, staff member)
- Ivan Fedorovych (1843–1846, employee)
- Sylvester Liskovatskyi (1844–1846, administrator)
- Lev Kordasevych (1846–1852)
- Ilarii Hrynevetskyi (1846–1849, staff)
- Ludwik Zahradnyk (1849–1850, staff member)
- Hryhorii Bilynskyi (1850–1852, 1862–1865+, staff)
- Ivan Davydovych (1852–1853, employee; 1853–1854, administrator)
- Hryhorii Koblosh (1853–1856, employee)
- Yosyp Levytskyi (1854–1860)
- Ananiia Nagornyatsevskyi (1858–1862, staff member)
- Mykhailo Lisykevych (1860–1862)
- Vasyl Bilynskyi (1862–1892+)
- Teofil Turchmanovych (1868–1870, staff member)
- Severyn Turchmanovych (1870–1871, staff member)
- Illia Siokalo (1873–1877, employee)
- Yulian Bilynskyi (1877–1886, staff member)
- Yosyf Bilynskyi (1887–1890, staff member)
- Mykola Bilynskyi (1891–1894, staff member)
- Ivan Savchak (1892–1893, administrator)
- Antin Krynytskyi (1894–1896, staff member)
- Mykhailo Yednakyi (1893–[1939])
- Ipolyt Khyliak (1896–1898, staff member)
- Ivan Kovba – at present.

== See also ==
- Saint Nicholas church OCU
