= Saint Nicholas Church, Nahuievychi =

Church in Lviv Oblast, Ukraine

Saint Nicholas Church
- Церква Святого Миколая Мирлікійського Чудотворця
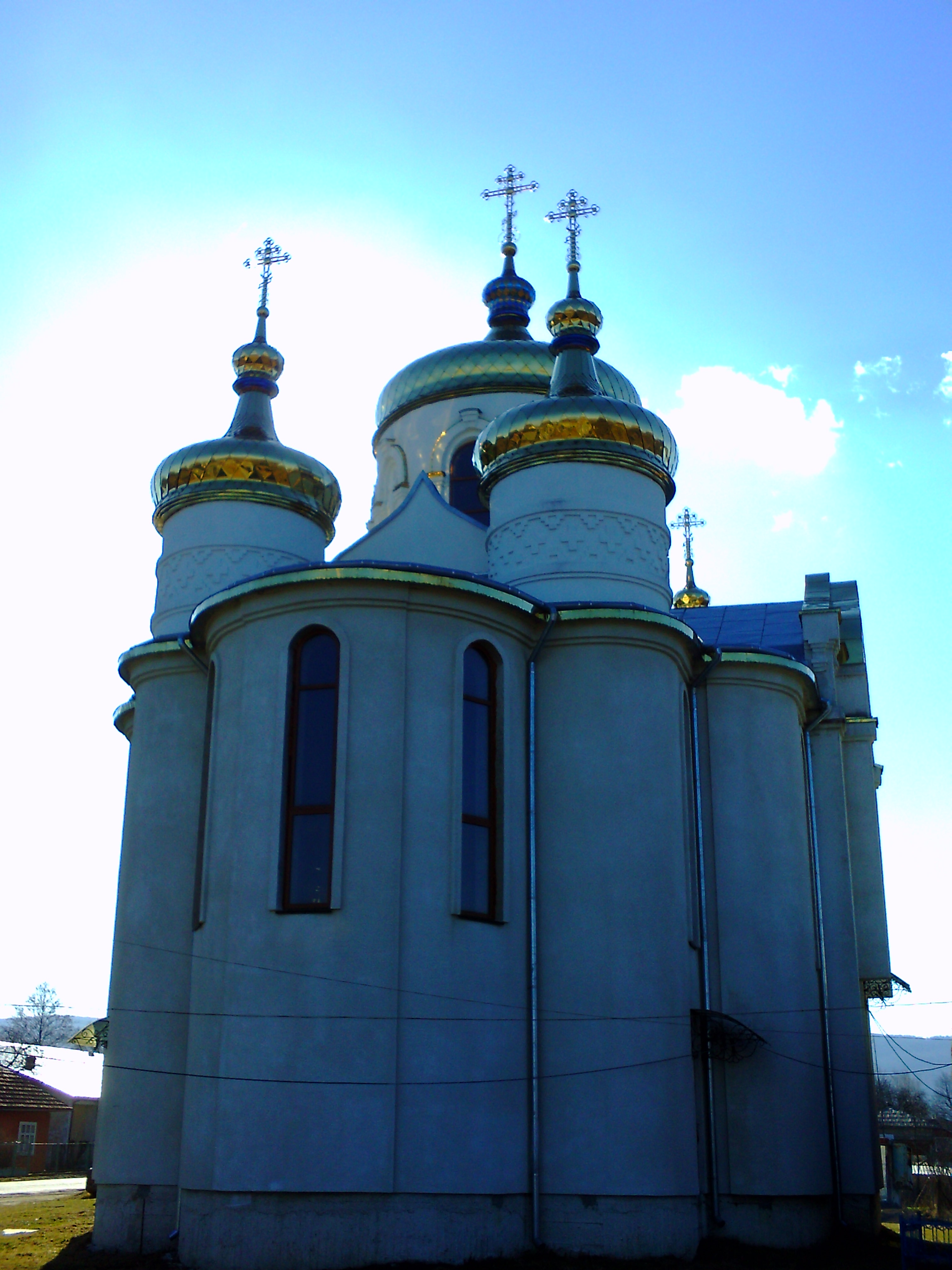

Religion
- Affiliation: Orthodox Church of Ukraine

Location
- Location: Nahuievychi, Drohobych urban hromada, Drohobych Raion, Lviv Oblast, Ukraine
- Interactive map of Saint Nicholas Church
- Coordinates: 49°22′02″N 23°20′01″E

Architecture
- Completed: 2014

Saint Nicholas Church (Ukrainian: Церква Святого Миколая Мирлікійського Чудотворця) orthodox parish church (OCU) in Nahuievychi of the Drohobych urban hromada, Drohobych Raion, Lviv Oblast. In the since-burned 1900-built wooden church, Ivan Franko was baptized.

== History ==
The first mention of the parish church in Nyzhni Nahuievychi dates back to 1507. In 1650 and 1672, it received privileges from the Polish kings John II Casimir Vasa and Michał Korybut Wiśniowiecki.

In 1800, a new wooden church was built. Ivan Kimakovych, the great-grandfather of Ivan Franko, donated six morgens of the field for the construction of the church. Yakiv, the father of the prominent poet, churchwarden, and member of the church brotherhood, made the iconostasis, candlesticks, crosses, and banners; in 1848 he donated an expensive silver-framed Gospel.

Until 1924, it was a daughter church of Verkhni Nahuievychi, and then became the main church. In 1961–1989 it was closed by the Soviet authorities.

During the Christmas holiday, on the night of January 8–9, 1996, the historical monument burned down. The fire destroyed precious 17th-century books and the Gospel. The Gospel had long been stored in the local museum, and, at the request of the parishioners, was returned to the church in 1992. In August of the same year, the Ivan Franko Literary and Memorial Museum in Nahuievychi hosted an exhibition entitled "Spalena sviatynia" which featured the surviving remains of the burned church.

A few months after the fire, the community built a chapel for worship. On 26 October 2014, the first liturgy was held in the newly built church.

== Priests ==
- Fedir Sushytskyi
- Yevstakhii Buchynskyi
- Teodor Sushytskyi
- Teodor Koblianskyi (1744)
- Mykola Vytoshynskyi ([1828]–1831+)
- Maksym Kolpachkevych (1831–1836, employee)
- Mykola Hrynevetskyi (1832–1844+)
- Yulian Yasenytskyi (1836–1843, staff member)
- Ivan Fedorovych (1843–1846, employee)
- Sylvester Liskovatskyi (1844–1846, administrator)
- Lev Kordasevych (1846–1852)
- Ilarii Hrynevetskyi (1846–1849, staff)
- Ludwik Zahradnyk (1849–1850, staff member)
- Hryhorii Bilynskyi (1850–1852, 1862–1865+, staff)
- Ivan Davydovych (1852–1853, employee; 1853–1854, administrator)
- Hryhorii Koblosh (1853–1856, employee)
- Yosyp Levytskyi (1854–1860)
- Ananiia Nagornyatsevskyi (1858–1862, staff member)
- Mykhailo Lisykevych (1860–1862)
- Vasyl Bilynskyi (1862–1892+)
- Teofil Turchmanovych (1868–1870, staff member)
- Severyn Turchmanovych (1870–1871, staff member)
- Illia Siokalo (1873–1877, employee)
- Yulian Bilynskyi (1877–1886, staff member)
- Yosyf Bilynskyi (1887–1890, staff member)
- Mykola Bilynskyi (1891–1894, staff member)
- Ivan Savchak (1892–1893, administrator)
- Antin Krynytskyi (1894–1896, staff member)
- Mykhailo Yednakyi (1893–[1939])
- Ipolyt Khyliak (1896–1898, staff member)
- Hryhorii Petrushchak (1989),
- Andrii Bezushko – at present.

== See also ==
- Church of the Translation of the Relics of Saint Nicholas UGCC
