= Selets =

Selets Селець Sielec
- Village
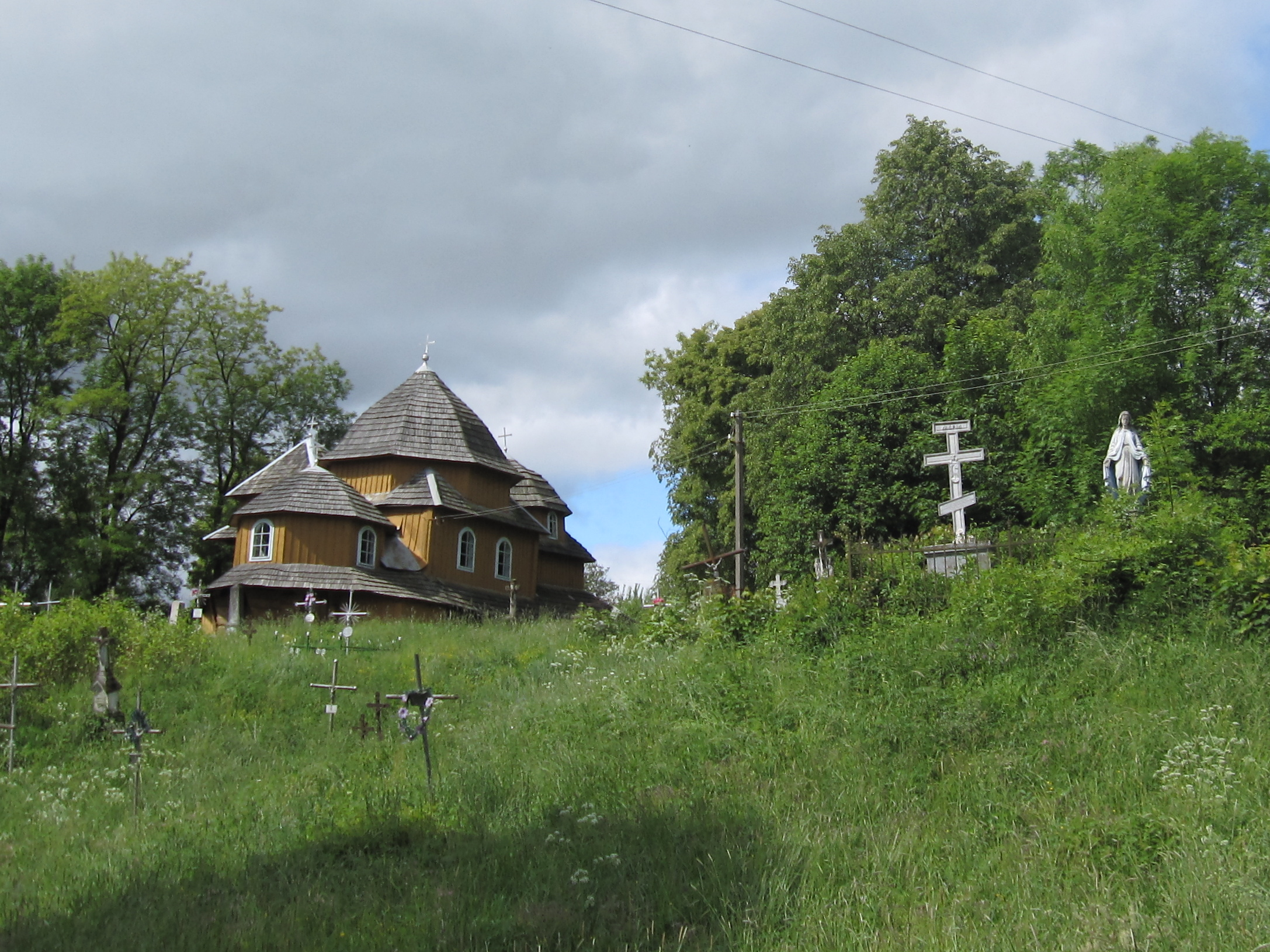
- Church of the Synaxis of the Theotokos and cemetery in Selets

- Location within Lviv Oblast Location within Ukraine
- Coordinates: 49°27′0″N 23°18′0″E
- Country: Ukraine
- Oblast: Lviv Oblast
- Raion: Drohobych Raion
- Founded: around 1430

Government
  - Mayor: Volodymyr Kravets

Area
  - Total: 0.021 km^{2} (0.0081 sq mi)
- Elevation: 342 m (1,122 ft)

Population (2001)
  - Total: 164
- Time zone: UTC+2 (EET)
  - Summer (DST): UTC+3 (EEST)
- Postal code: 82123
- Area code: +380 3244
- Website: Selets on the Verkhovna Rada of Ukraine website

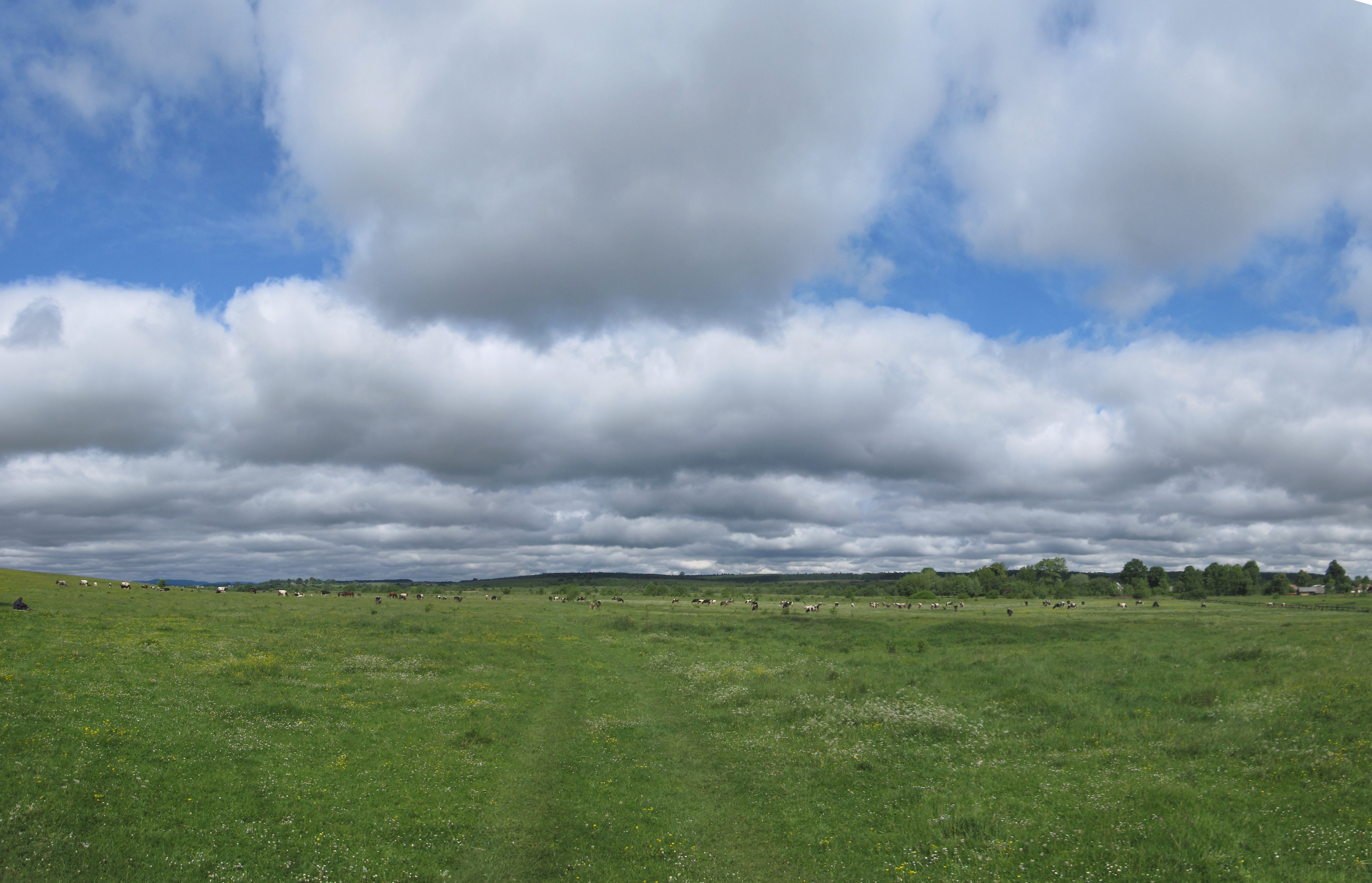
View of the landscape around Selets (2009)

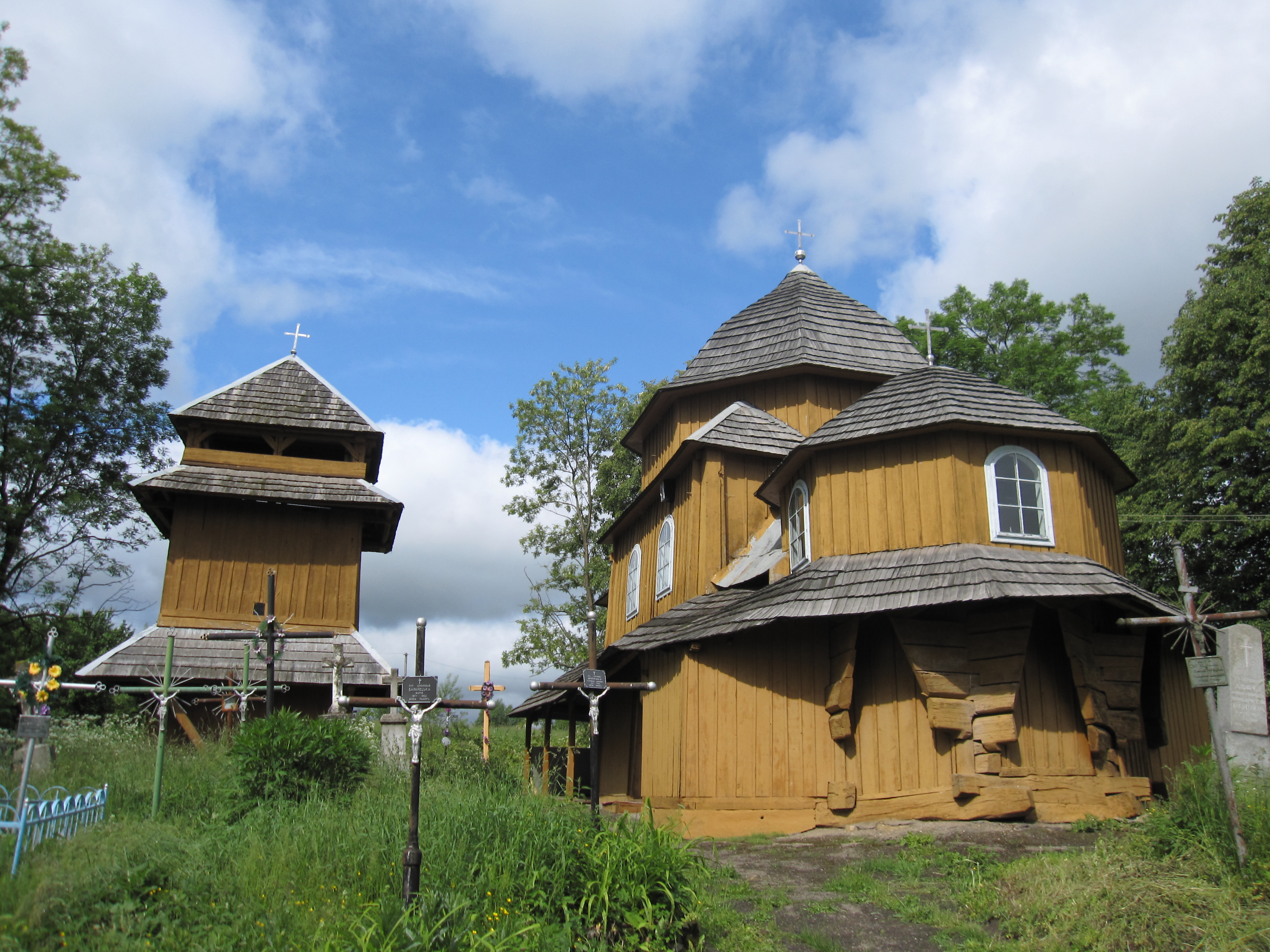
Church with belfry, dating to at least the 17th century (2009)

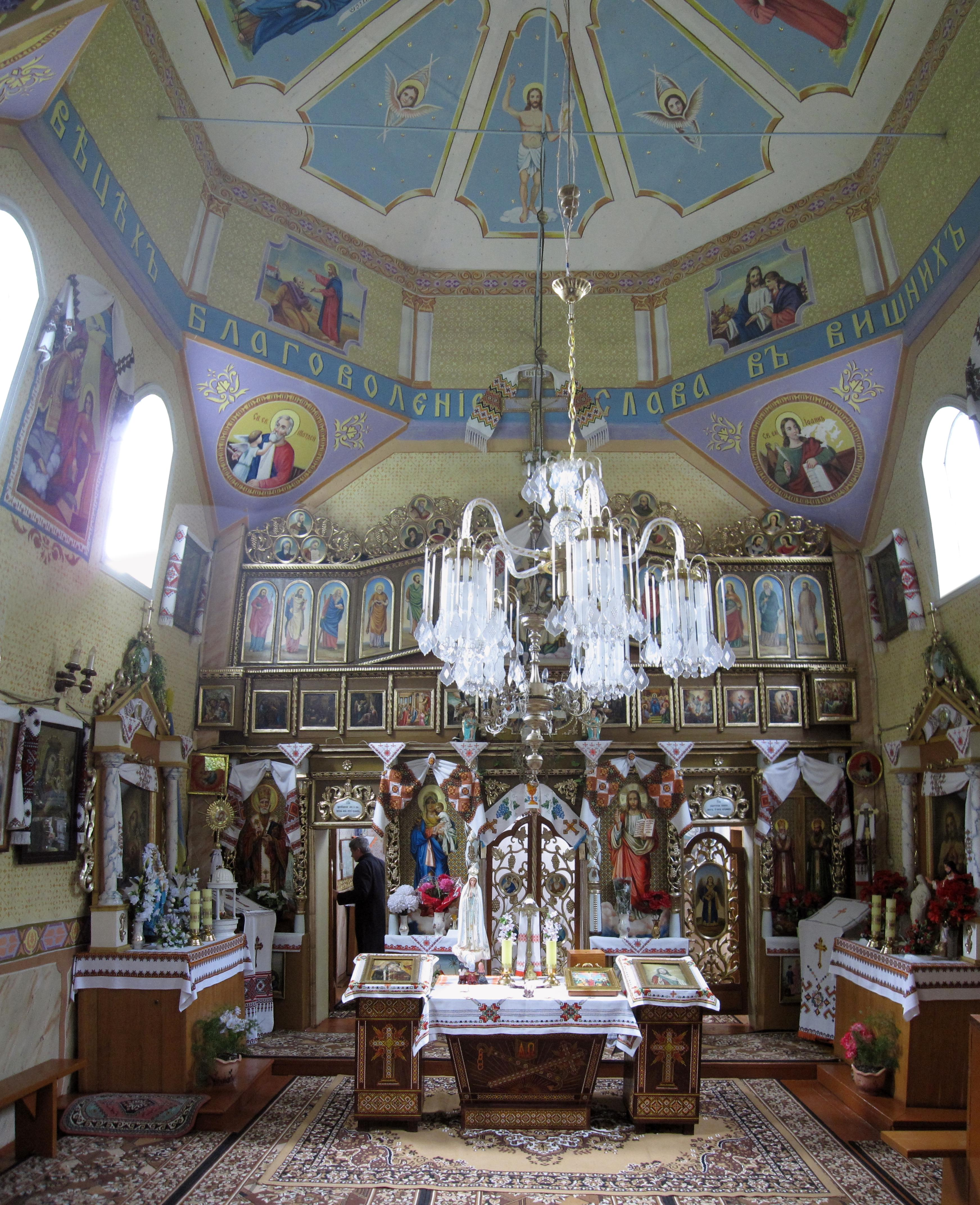
Interior of the Church (2009)

Selets (Ukrainian: Селець, romanized: Selets, Polish: Sielec) is a village about 13.5 kilometers southeast of Sambir within Drohobych Raion of Lviv Oblast in western Ukraine. It belongs to Drohobych urban hromada, one of the hromadas of Ukraine. The village was founded probably in the 15th century CE.

To the north lies the village and forest of Side (Сіде), to the east Horodyshche (Городище), to the south Mokriany (Мокряни) and to the west Vilshanyk (Вільшаник). Geographically, the area lies in the Dniester river basin, to which the Bystrytsia (Бистриця) and the Cherkhavka (Черхавка) rivers are tributaries.

Together with the villages of Kotovane (Котоване) and Stupnytsia (Ступниця), it administratively forms a local village council.

== History ==
The village was first mentioned in 1538 in a document from 1559. King Michał Korybut Wiśniowiecki established the parish between 1669 and 1673, during which time a royal church was constructed. Another church with its own parish for the local Polish-speaking nobility (szlachta) was built later; both parishes coexisted before they later merged.

While the area was crown property, the Dżurdż family was given half of it at an unknown date. Around 1650 King John II Casimir awarded the Cossack Otaman Skrebeciowicz the other half of the Sielec estate, as well as the right to bear the Sas coat of arms for his loyal services to the crown during the Khmelnytsky Uprising. After the Austrian partition of southern Poland in 1772, the Skrebeciowicz de Sielecki family’s noble status was reaffirmed by the imperial court in Vienna who gave it the hereditary German title of Ritter.

According to historical documents, in 1880 Selets had a total population of 781 inhabitants, of which 657 were Greek Catholics, thirty-two were Roman Catholics, eighty-five were Jewish, and seven were of other faiths. According to an 1889 census, 728 of the inhabitants at the time were ethnic "Ruthenians" (i. e. Rusyns or Ukrainians), 50 were Polish, and three were German-speaking (Galiziendeutsche). Furthermore, the town incorporated 172 houses in the same census; the manor house (dwór) and local lords’ estates employed around forty-seven people.

The area changed hands multiple times: after the collapse of the Austro-Hungarian empire in 1918, Selets reverted to newly independent Poland and administratively became a part of Lwów Voivodeship. In late September 1939, following German and Soviet aggression on Poland and Molotov–Ribbentrop Pact, Lwów Voivodeship was divided by the two sides. Selets was occupied by the Soviets and incorporated into Ukrainian Soviet Socialist Republic, only to be overrun again by the invading German Wehrmacht in the summer of 1941. After the war it was finally incorporated into Ukraine. The population dropped substantially due to World War II and the Stalinist Soviet regime. The local Jewish population was murdered during the Holocaust; after the war, members of the local nobility as well as wealthier peasants and non-Ukrainians were either executed or deported to Siberia by the communists, where they perished in the gulags. Farmers were forced to hand over their land for collectivization. After the fall of the Iron Curtain in 1989 and the collapse of the local kolkhoz, high unemployment forced many, especially young people, to leave for larger towns in flights of urbanization. The 2001 national census counted 164 inhabitants, and in 2009 the village consisted of around 40 houses, down from 300 in the past.

== Sights ==
The area is marked by rolling hills and agricultural land rich with chornozem. The local economy consists mainly of farming, along with animal husbandry of cattle and horses. The manor house remains have been lost over time as well as the royal church mentioned in historical annals, while the church for the nobility still exists.

The Greek Catholic Church of the Synaxis of the Theotokos (Ukrainian: Богородицька Церква) is located on a hill. With its belfry, it serves as an example of a rural wooden church in Ukraine. Constructed in the seventeenth century, it is surrounded by a historic cemetery. The church was funded by local nobility and used for worship by them—members would be buried there as well. It was closed and lay in a ruined state during the Communist era. Only after the end of the Soviet Union was the church restored, using local funds and donations.

The church has a cross-shaped layout consisting of three parts: the narthex in the front, the central nave and the apse in the back, which is shielded by an iconostasis. The church is around eighteen meters long and eight meters wide; the nave measures less than six meters square. The exterior has a slightly different appearance than in the 1970s, when the towering roofs had to be replaced and made more simply than before. The nave is capped by a small octagonal dome that is richly decorated with religious paintings and painted in white and light blue. The floor is carpeted. The iconostasis probably dates to the nineteenth century. The nobility had reserved benches on the left side of the church, while the Ruthenian peasants would sit or stand to the right. The church is listed as a protected heritage site.

The smaller Chapel of the Holy Apostles Peter and Paul is located close to the foot of the hill. Built of concrete, it is a smaller edifice constructed in 2000 to commemorate the second millennium and was dedicated on July 12, 2000. It replaced a previous wooden chapel that was originally used only by the local peasants. Located along the road leading to the village is the new cemetery. From Selets en route to Drohobych lies a memorial site in a forest for the local Jewish population that was murdered during the Shoah.

== Gallery ==
Layout of the Church of the Synaxis of the Theotokos

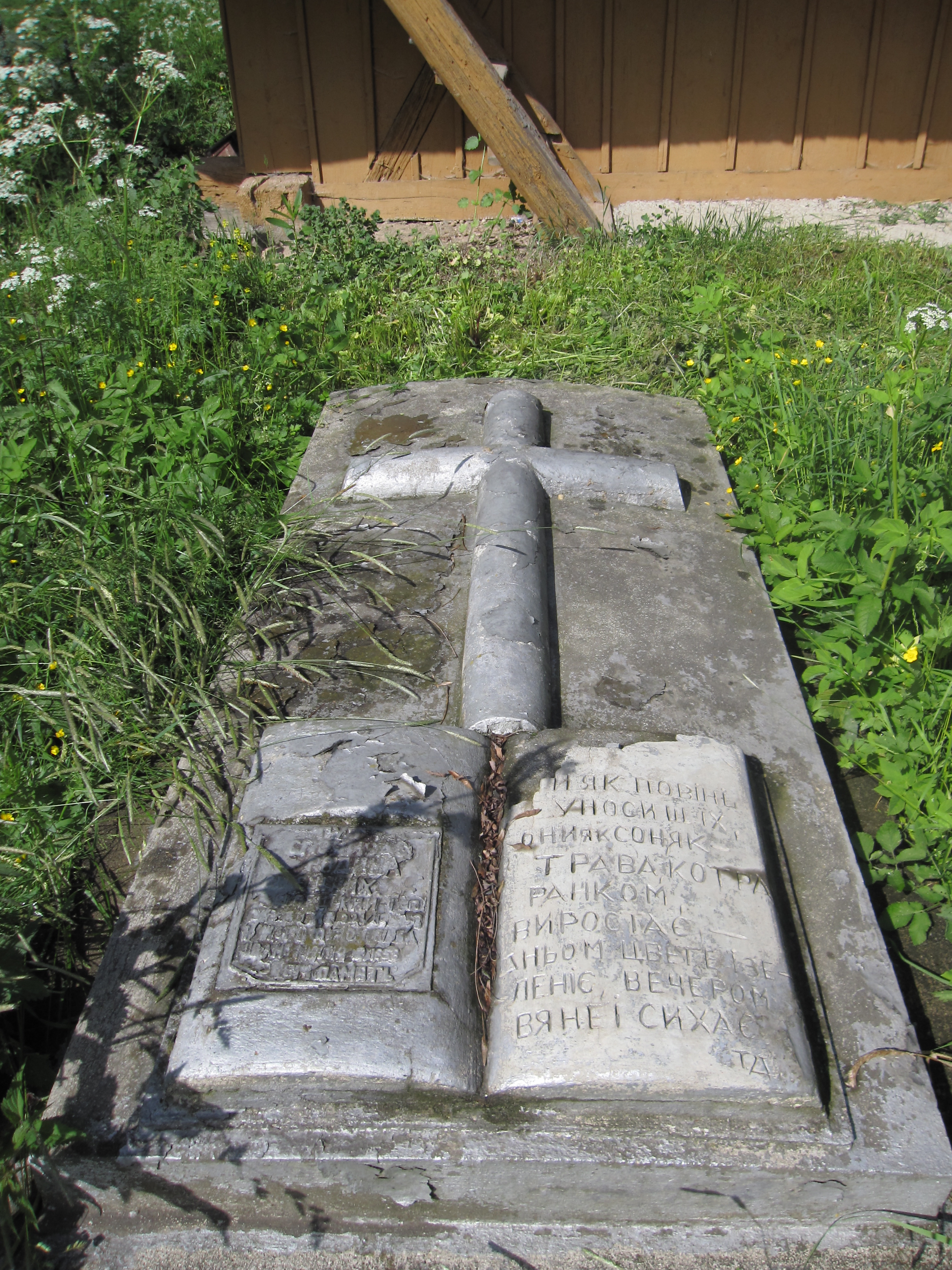
One of the oldest tombs in the old cemetery of the Sielecki family

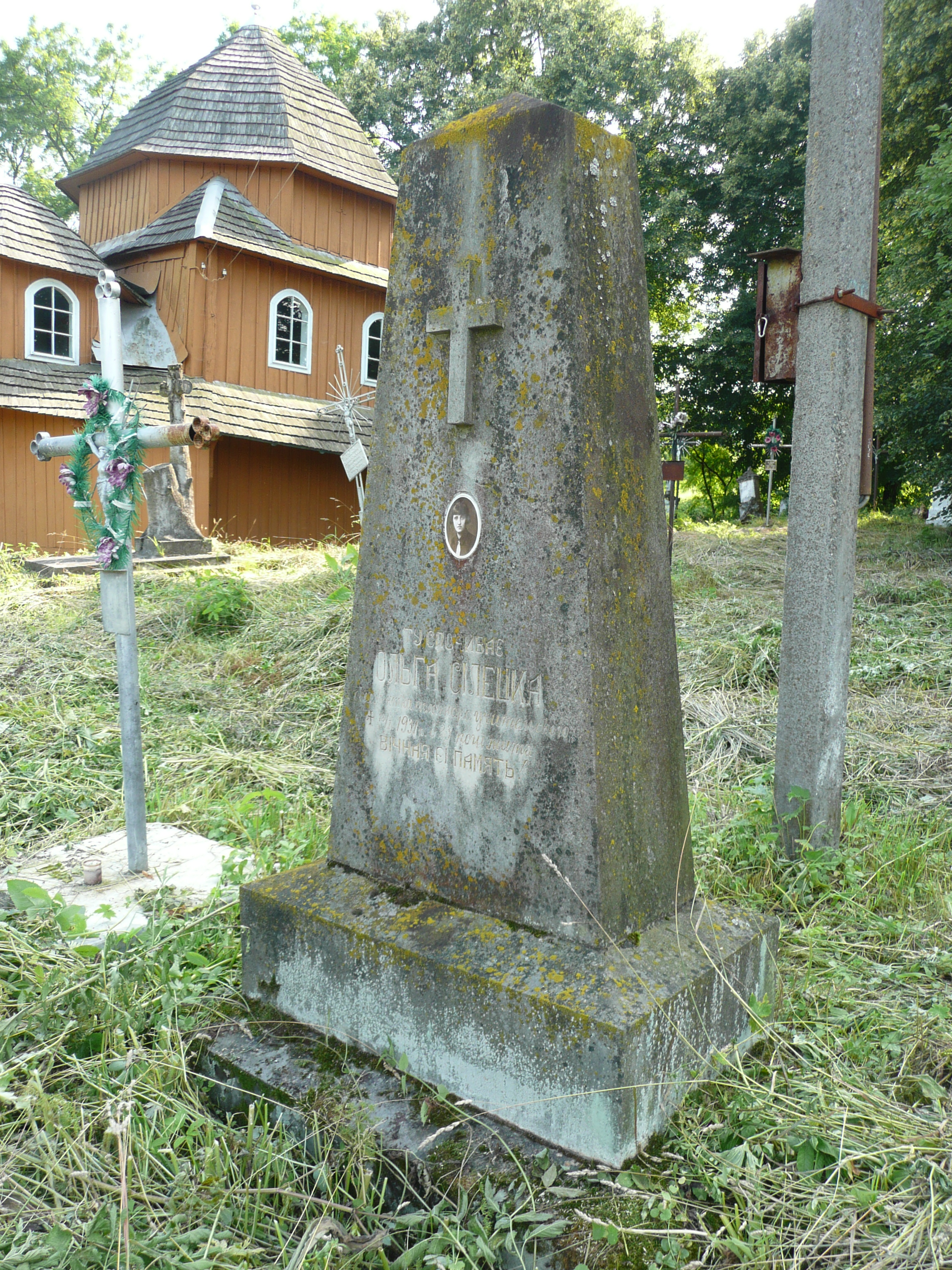
Grave at the old cemetery of Olga Sielecka (1908-1931)

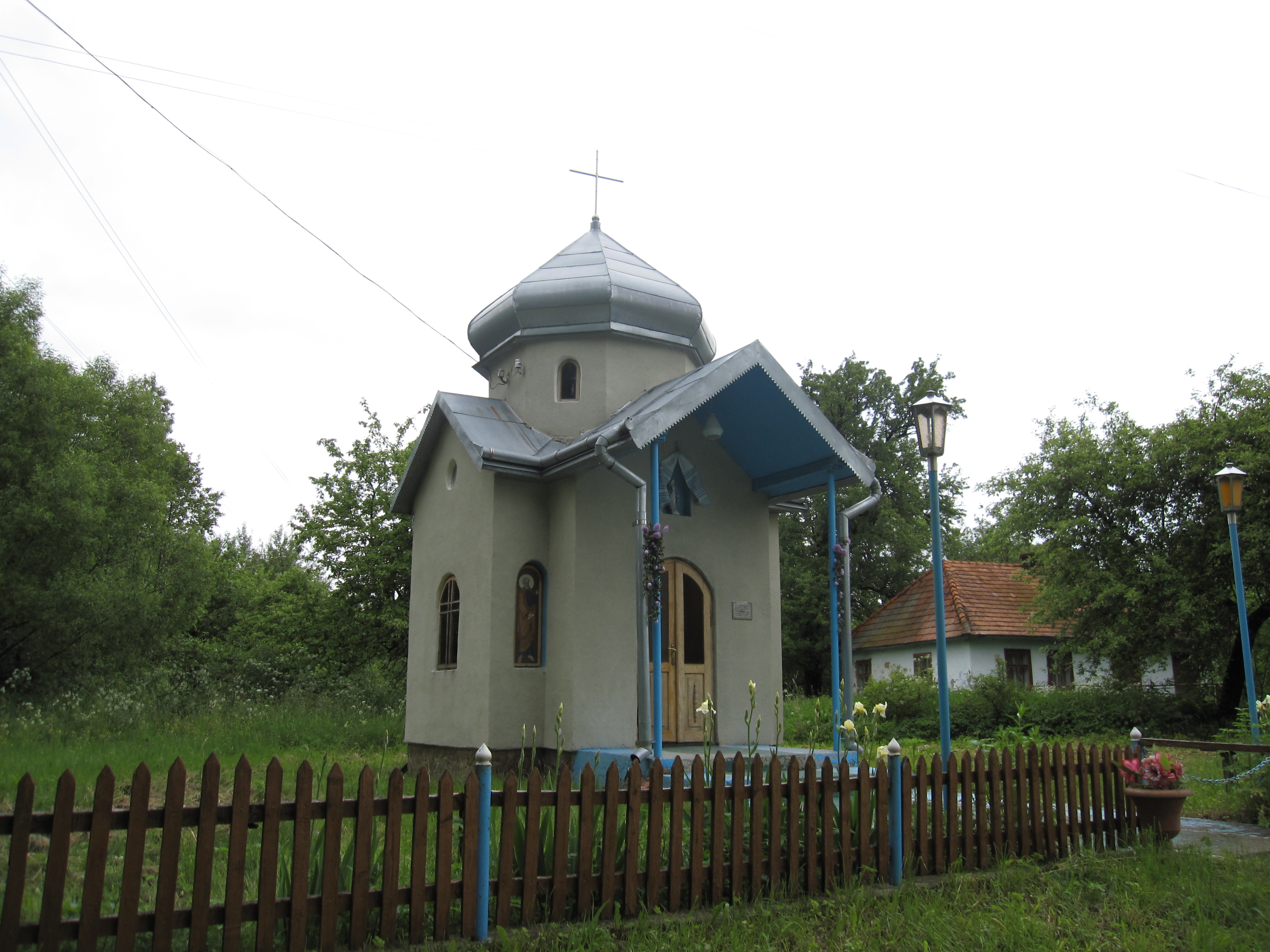
Chapel of the Holy Apostles Peter and Paul

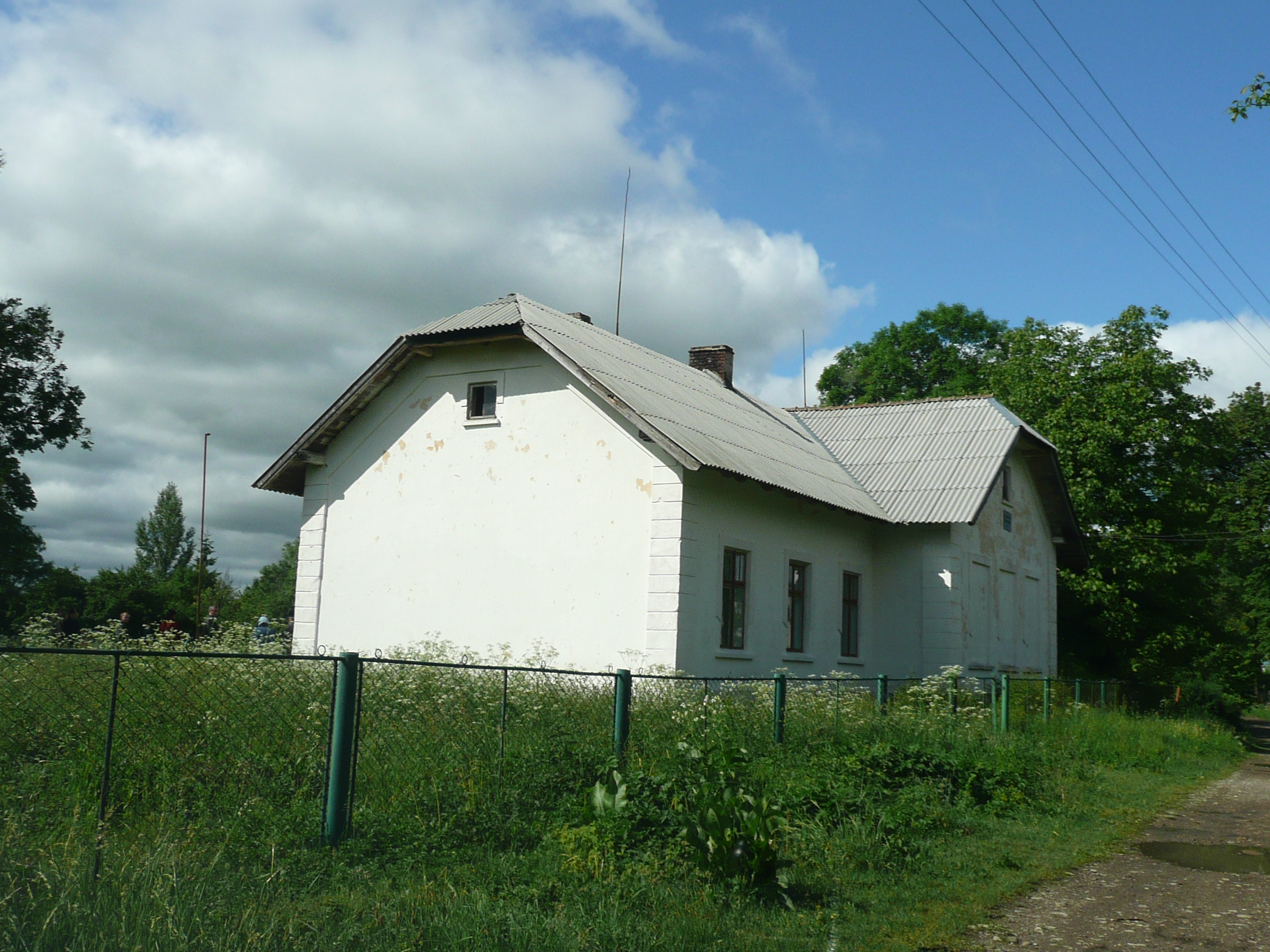
Local school and community house

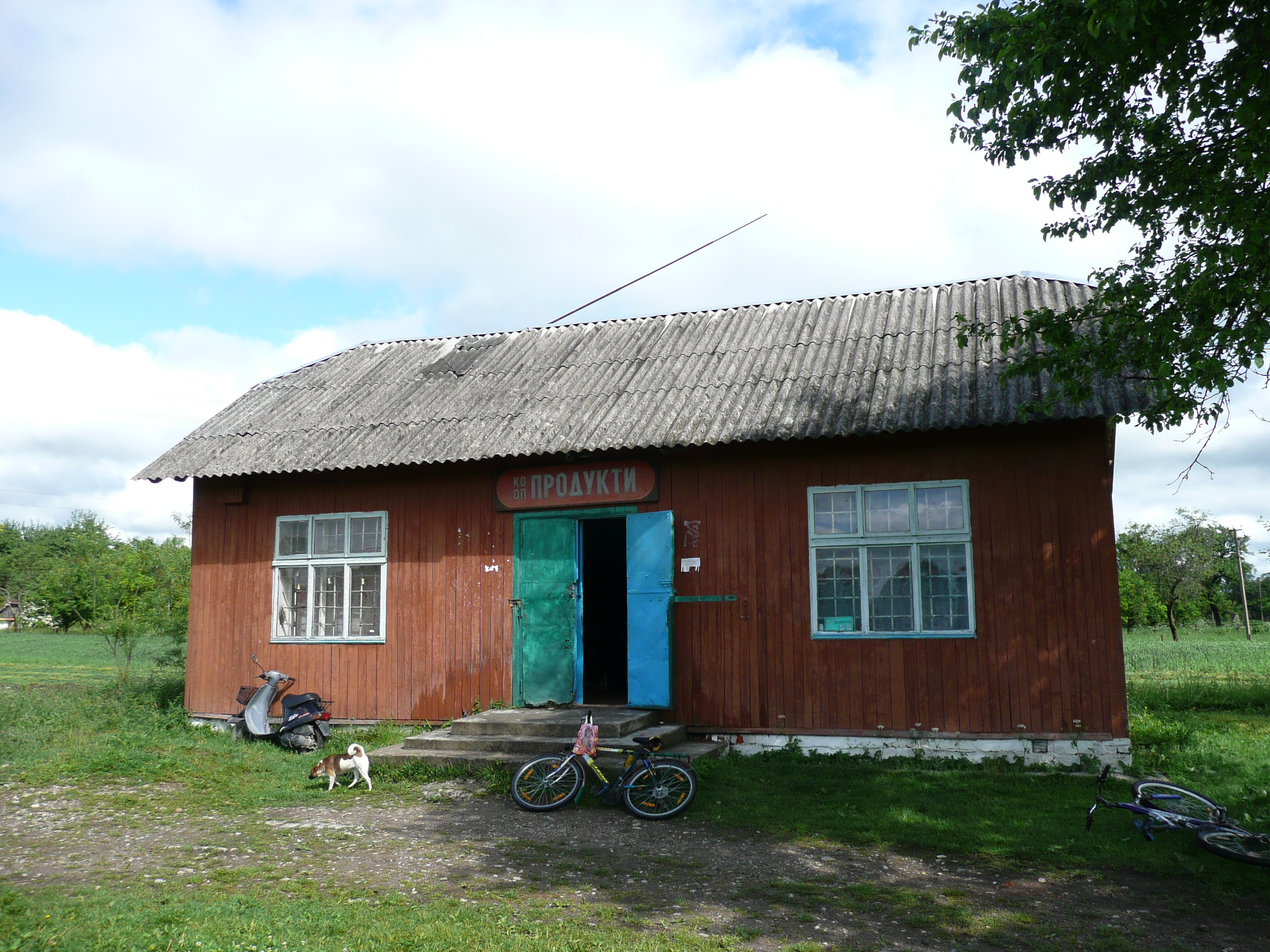
Local store ПРОДУКТИ

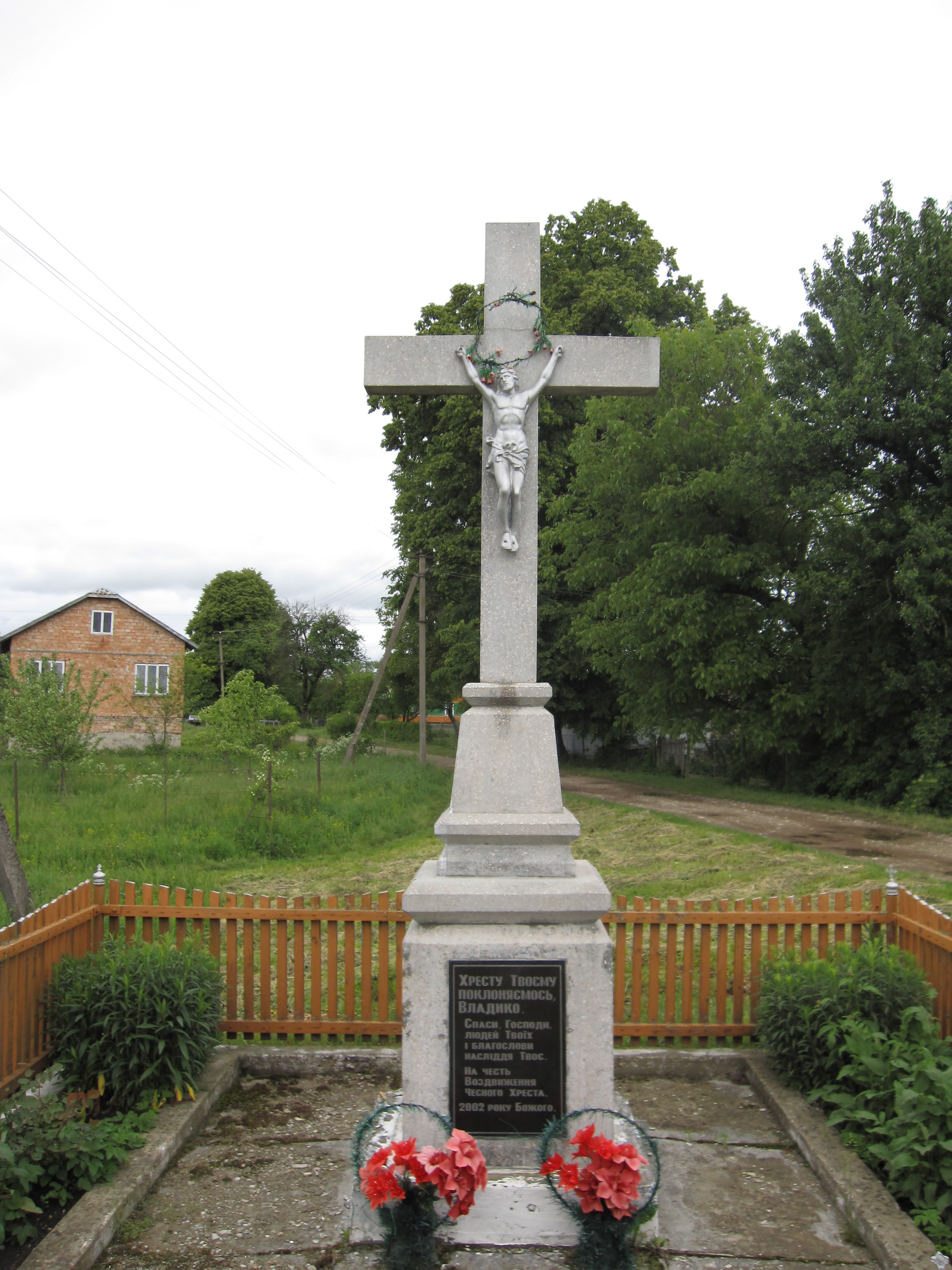
Crucifix set up in 2002 opposite the new cemetery

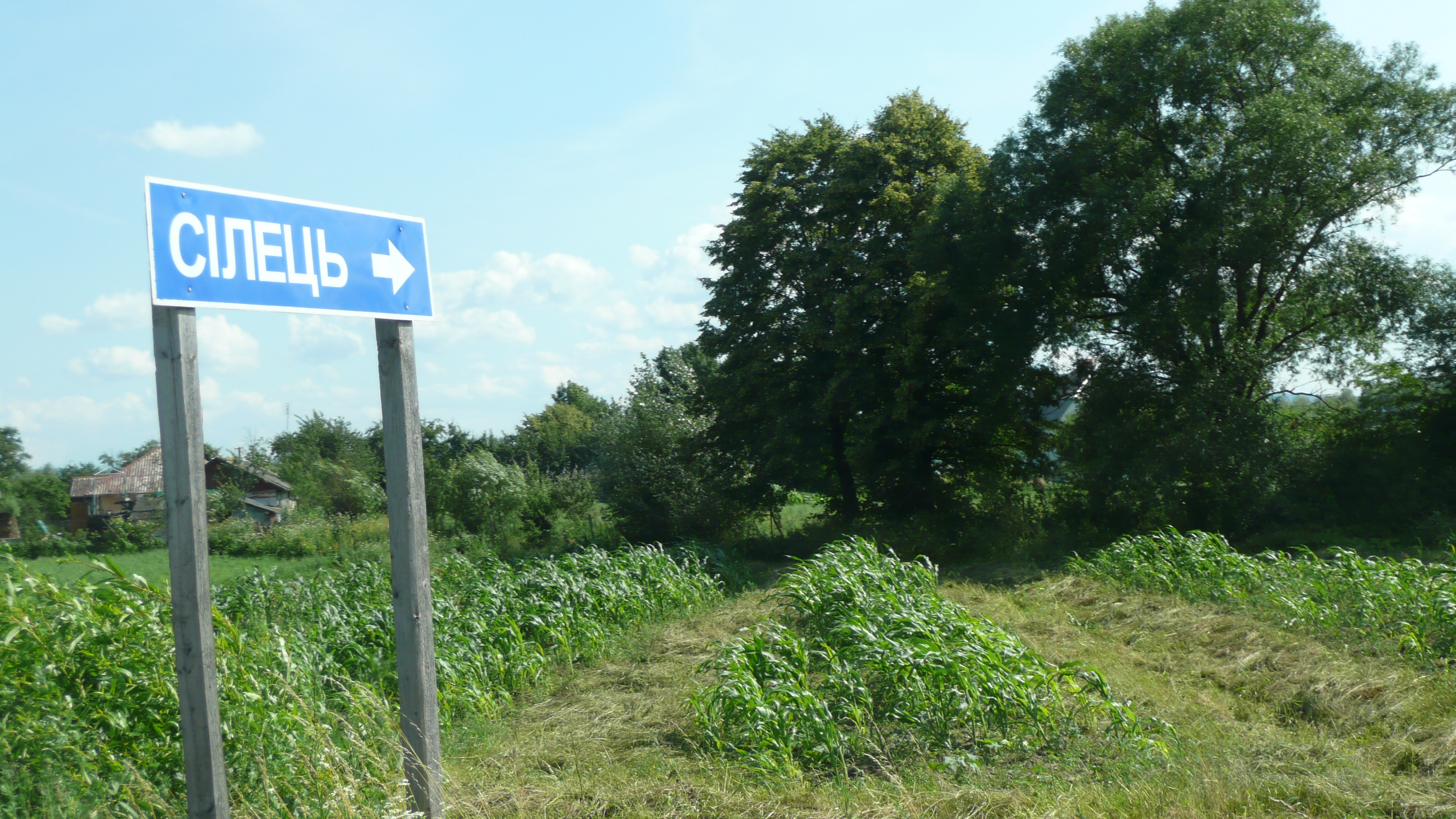
Road sign off the main road between Sambir and Drohobych

== Literature ==
- Krushynska, Olena (2007). Forty four wooden churches of Lviv region. Grani-T, Kyiv. pp. 62–64. ISBN 978-966-465-076-9. (in Ukrainian).
- Slobodyan, V. (1998). Churches of Ukraine: Perzemyhsl diocese. Lviv. pp. 863. (in Ukrainian).
