= Medenychi settlement hromada =

Settlement hromada in Lviv Oblast, Ukraine

Medenychi settlement hromada Меденицька селищна громада
- Hromada
- Seal

- Location within Lviv Oblast Location within Ukraine
- Coordinates: 49°25′37″N 23°44′45″E
- Country: Ukraine
- Oblast (province): Lviv Oblast
- Raion (district): Drohobych Raion

Area
  - Total: 285.8 km^{2} (110.3 sq mi)

Population (2023)
  - Total: 18,751
- Website: medenycka-gromada.gov.ua

Medenychi settlement territorial hromada (Ukrainian: Меденицька селищна територіальна громада, romanized: Medenytska selyshchna terytorialna hromada) is one of the hromadas of Ukraine, located in Drohobych Raion in the country's western Lviv Oblast. Its administrative centre is the settlement of Medenychi.

The hromada has an area of 285.8 km^{2} (110.3 mi^{2}), as well as a population of 18,751 (as of 2023). It was established as an amalgamated hromada on 23 December 2018 before being expanded in 2020.

== Composition ==
In addition to one settlement (Medenychi), the hromada includes 17 villages:

- Daliava
- Dovhe
- Horodkivka
- Hrushiv
- Korosnytsia (Note: Part of the amalgamated hromada prior to its 2020 expansion.)
- Letnia
- Litynia
- Opory
- Ripchytsi
- Rivne
- Roliv
- Solonske
- Tyniv
- Verkhnii Dorozhiv
- Voloshcha
- Voroblevychi
- Zady
