= Korosnytsia =

Village in Lviv Oblast, Ukraine

Korosnytsia Коросниця
- Village
- Location within Ukraine
- Coordinates: 49°24′18″N 23°46′46″E
- Oblast (province) Raion (district): Ukraine
- Oblast: Lviv Oblast
- Raion: Drohobych Raion
- Founded: around 1784

Population (2001)
  - Total: 144
- Time zone: UTC+2 (EET)
  - Summer (DST): UTC+3 (EEST)
- Postal code: 82150
- Area code: +380 3244

Korosnytsia (Ukrainian: Коросниця, German: Josephsberg or Josefsberg, Polish: Korośnica or Korosnica) is a village in Drohobych Raion, Lviv Oblast, south-west Ukraine. It belongs to Medenychi settlement hromada, one of the hromadas of Ukraine. The community was founded in 1784, and in 2001 had a population of 144. Korosnytsia, originally known as Josefsberg in German and later also as Korosnica in Polish, is located four kilometers from the town of Medenychi and 22 kilometers from Drohobych.

== History ==
Josefsberg was one of many German villages created by a colonization program initiated by the Austrian Emperor Joseph II in 1782 (Josephine colonization). Houses and out buildings were built in the villages with outlying tracts of land assigned to each house. Joseph II encouraged German farmers, typically from the Palatinate (i.e. Rheinland-Pflaz, a state now in south-west Germany), to relocate to the area, and farm the land. The government supplied them with farm equipment, livestock, seed grain, and everything necessary to begin farming. By 1880 the population of Josefsberg was 750.

The settlers were assured complete and comprehensive freedom of conscience and religion as per the "Settlement-Patent" of September 21, 1782. Approximately 90 of 163 German villages were exclusively Protestant (Lutheran) faith, Josefsberg being one of them.

The 1882 Polish geographic dictionary described the people of Josefsberg: "They are of Helvetic confession, have their own priest, beautiful stone church, evangelical school. The parish include the neighbouring village of Ugartsberg. Evangelical Reformed Parish was established by the Austrian cesar (king) Joseph II in 1784, the parish (together with Ugartsberg) has 1,419 people; 773 in Josefsberg; church of 1805 and a cemetery."

At the onset of World War II the Germans still living in these villages were resettled back into German-occupied territories. With the departure of the German Lutherans, the village became inhabited by Ukrainians. The original Lutheran church now sports an onion-shaped spire.

== Gallery ==
A typical house

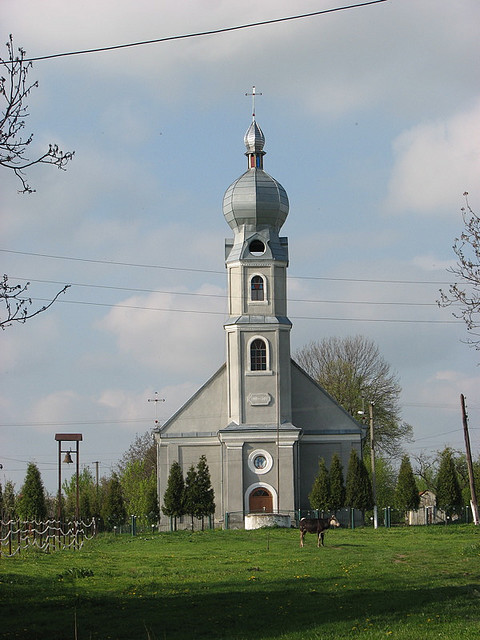
The church now Ukrainian Orthodox
