= Opaka, Ukraine =

Opaka Опака
- Village
- Interactive map of Opaka
- Coordinates: 49°17′00″N 23°17′27″E
- Country: Ukraine
- Oblast: Lviv Oblast
- Raion: Drohobych Raion
- Hromada: Drohobych urban hromada

Population
  - Total: 1,755
- Postal code: 82191

Opaka (Ukrainian: Опака) is a village (selo) in Drohobych Raion, Lviv Oblast, in southwest Ukraine. It belongs to Drohobych urban hromada, one of the hromadas of Ukraine.

== Notable people ==
- Lubomyra Mandziy (1973-2021), Ukrainian educator, acting Minister of Education (2020)
