= Zaluzhany =

Zaluzhany may refer to the following places in Ukraine:

- Zaluzhany, Drohobych Raion, Lviv Oblast
- Zaluzhany, Sambir Raion, Lviv Oblast
- Zaluzhany, Horodok Raion, Lviv Oblast
- Zaluzhany, Sumy Oblast
