= Dolishnii Luzhok =

Rural locality in Lviv Oblast, Ukraine

Coordinates: 49°26′59″N 23°22′10″E

Dolishnii Luzhok is a village situated 14 kilometers away from Drohobych, in Drohobych Raion of Lviv Oblast, Ukraine. It belongs to Drohobych urban hromada, one of the hromadas of Ukraine. Dolishnii Luzhok has almost 500 inhabitants.
