= Zady =

Village in Lviv Oblast, Ukraine

Coordinates: 49°29′43″N 23°39′12″E

Zady (Ukrainian: Зади) is a village in Ukraine in Drohobych Raion, Lviv Oblast. It belongs to Medenychi settlement hromada, one of the hromadas of Ukraine.

The village is located in the Hrushiv starosta district of the Medenychi settlement hromada in the north-east of Drohobych raion (district), 23 kilometres from the district centre.

The settlement is located on a flat, humid area at an altitude of 260 m above sea level.

The village has one urbanonym (name of the street) - Josyf Slipyj Street.

The number of inhabitants is 50 people (2001). As of 2025, about 30 people de facto live in the village.

The letter ‘y’ is emphasised in the name.

According to onomastist Vira Kotovych, the name of the settlement reflects its location. The oikonym is formed from the Ukrainian word zady < zad - ‘a place behind the yards, behind houses, huts’.

In the centre of the village there is a wooden church-chapel of St. Elijah the Prophet.
