= Sniatynka =

Rural locality in Lviv Oblast, Ukraine

Sniatynka Снятинка
- Village
- Location within Lviv Oblast Location within Ukraine
- Coordinates: 49°42′12″N 23°29′14″E
- Country: Ukraine
- Oblast: Lviv
- Raion: Drohobych
- Area: 1.60 km^{2} (0.62 sq mi)
- Population: 924
  - Density: 578/km^{2} (1,500/sq mi)

Sniatynka (Ukrainian: Снятинка, Polish: Śniatynka) is a village (selo) in Drohobych Raion, Lviv Oblast, in south-west Ukraine. It belongs to Drohobych urban hromada, one of the hromadas of Ukraine.

The village was first mentioned in the middle of the 14th century.
