= Novoshychi =

Rural locality in Lviv Oblast, Ukraine

Novoshychi Новошичі
- Village
- Location within Lviv Oblast Location within Ukraine
- Coordinates: 49°28′07″N 23°25′07″E
- Country: Ukraine
- Oblast: Lviv
- Raion: Drohobych
- Area: 0.494 km^{2} (0.191 sq mi)

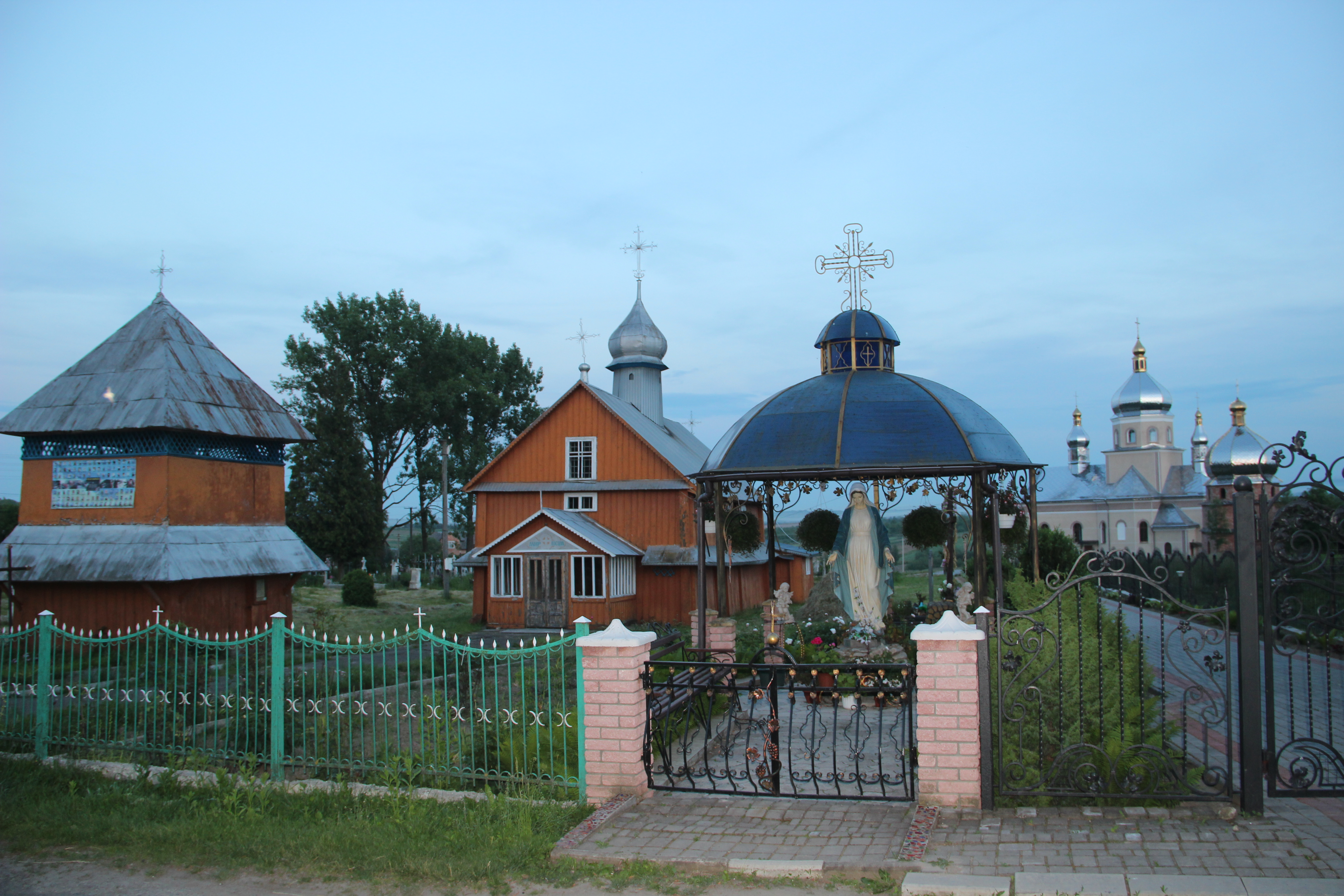
These two temples are the center of the spiritual life of the village of Novoshychi.

Novoshychi (Ukrainian: Новошичі, Polish: Nowoszyce) is a village (selo) in Drohobych Raion, Lviv Oblast, in south-west Ukraine. It belongs to Drohobych urban hromada, one of the hromadas of Ukraine.

The village was first mentioned in 1377.
