= Bronytsia =

Rural locality in Lviv Oblast, Ukraine

Coordinates: 49°26′46″N 23°26′14″E

- Village
- Interactive map of Bronytsia
- Country: Ukraine
- Oblast: Lviv
- Raion: Drohobych
- Area: 4.700 km^{2} (1.815 sq mi)
- Population: 901
  - Density: 191.7/km^{2} (497/sq mi)

Bronytsia (Ukrainian: Брониця) is a village (selo) in Drohobych Raion, Lviv Oblast, in southwest Ukraine. It belongs to Drohobych urban hromada, one of the hromadas of Ukraine.

From 1918 to 1939, the village was in Lwów Voivodeship in Poland.
