= Nahuievychi =

Rural locality in Lviv Oblast, Ukraine

Nahuievychi Нагуєвичі
- Village
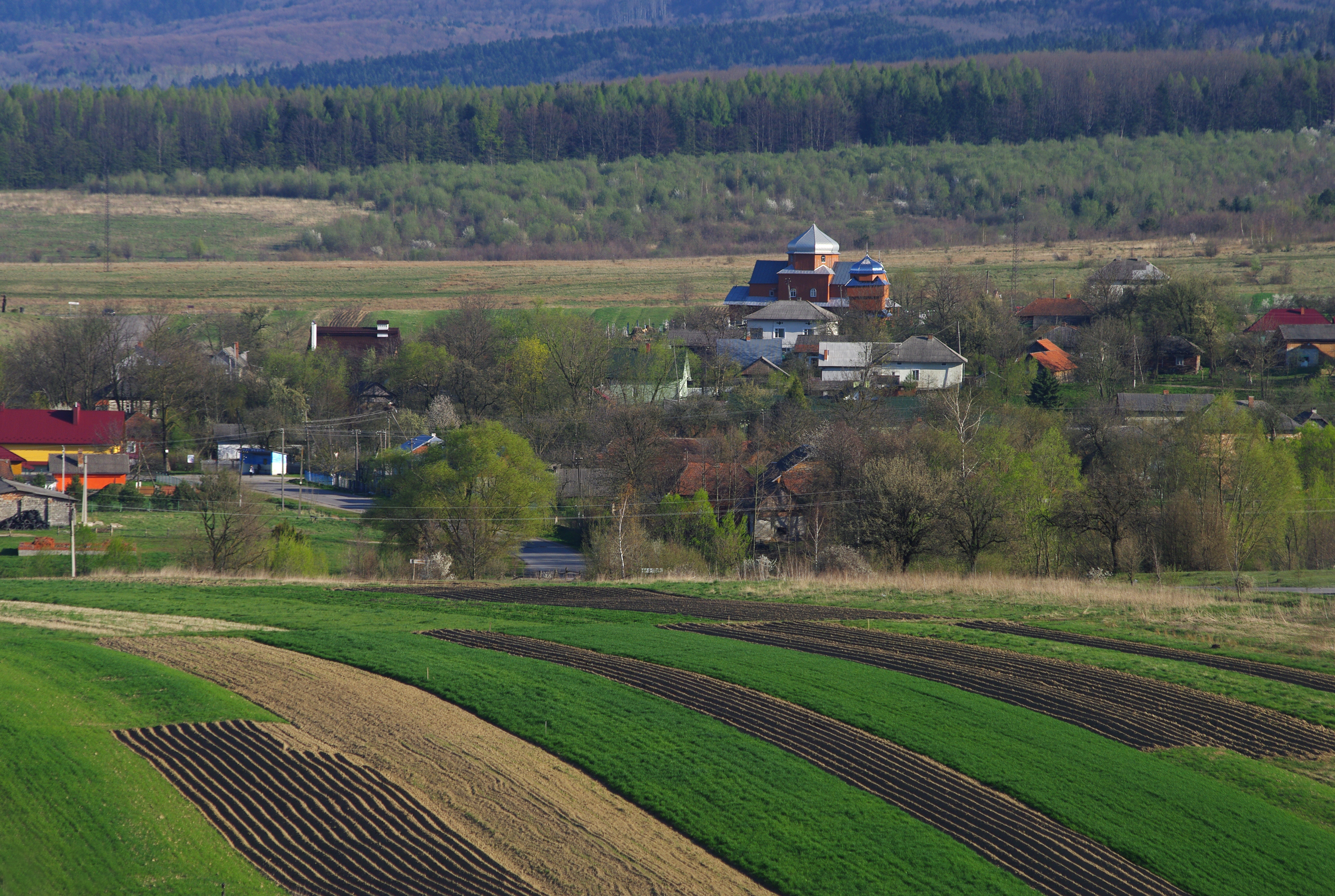
- Interactive map of Nahuievychi
- Location within Lviv Oblast Location within Ukraine
- Coordinates: 49°21′43″N 23°19′14″E
- Country: Ukraine
- Oblast: Lviv Oblast
- Raion: Drohobych Raion
- Hromada: Drohobych urban hromada
- Established: 1050

Area
  - Total: 28.711 km^{2} (11.085 sq mi)
- Elevation /(average value of): 334 m (1,096 ft)

Population
  - Total: 2 518
  - Density: 0.070/km^{2} (0.18/sq mi)
- Time zone: UTC+2 (EET)
  - Summer (DST): UTC+3 (EEST)
- Postal code: 82126
- Area code: +380 3244
- Website: село Нагуєвичі ^{(Ukrainian)}

Nahuievychi (Ukrainian: Нагуєвичі; Polish: Nahujowice) is a village in Drohobych Raion, Lviv Oblast, Ukraine. It belongs to Drohobych urban hromada, one of the hromadas of Ukraine.

Nahuyevychi is the birthplace of poet and writer Ivan Franko (1856–1916). Ivan Franko was a famous Ukrainian activist, a Ukrainian poet, writer, doctor of philosophy, ethnographer. Franko was born in Nahuyevichi in Austrian-controlled eastern Galicia, today part of Lviv Oblast (oblast of Ukraine), and was the son of a village blacksmith, of German ancestry. The village is the location of the Nahuievychi State Historical and Cultural Reserve, a Ukrainian historic site designated in 1994.

The village covers an area of 28.711 km^{2} and the population of village is about 2,518 persons. Local government is administered by Nahuievychi Village Council.

== Geography ==
The village is located in a picturesque corner in the foothills of the Carpathians of Drohobych district at a distance 15 kilometres (9.3 mi) from the district center Drohobych, 92 kilometres (57 mi) from the regional center of Lviv and 26 kilometres (16 mi) from the town of Sambir.

== History ==
The first written mention dates back to year 1050 and had the name Solne, afterwards Bashevo. The village was called Nahuievychi from 1240.

== Religion ==
- Church of the Transfer of the Relics of St. Nicholas with a bell tower (1801, wooden, UGCC; architectural monuments of national importance),
- Church of St. Nicholas (2012, brick, OCU; built on the site of a wooden church where Ivan Franko was baptized).

== Nahuievychi State Historical and Cultural Reserve ==
The "Nahuievychi State Historical and Cultural Reserve" is a reserve of Regional State Administration of the Lviv Oblast, which was designated on March 10, 1994. The preserve structure includes: the writer's parents' lodge, the I. Franko Museum, I. Franko and world literature sculptural composition, I. Franko's Path art-memorial complex.

In the village there are Franko's farmstead and museum.

== Literature ==
- Історія міст і сіл УРСР: Львівська область, Івана Франка. – К. : ГРУРЕ, 1968 р. Page 286 (in Ukrainian)
