= Boryslav urban hromada =

Urban hromada in Lviv Oblast

Boryslav urban hromada Бориславська міська громада
- Hromada
- Seal

- Location within Lviv Oblast Location within Ukraine
- Coordinates: 49°17′21″N 23°25′08″E
- Country: Ukraine
- Oblast (province): Lviv Oblast
- Raion (district): Drohobych Raion

Area
  - Total: 159.2 km^{2} (61.5 sq mi)

Population (2023)
  - Total: 41,676
- Website: boryslavrada.gov.ua

Boryslav urban territorial hromada (Ukrainian: Бориславська міська територіальна громада, romanized: Boryslavska miska terytorialna hromada) is one of the hromadas of Ukraine, located in Lviv Oblast's Drohobych Raion. Its capital is the city of Boryslav.

The hromada has an area of 159.2 km^{2} (61.5 mi^{2}), as well as a population of 41,676 (as of 2023).

== Composition ==
In addition to one city (Boryslav), the hromada includes six villages:

- Mokriany
- Pidmonastyrok
- Popeli
- Urizh
- Vynnyky
- Yasenytsia-Silna
