= Voloshcha =

Rural locality in Lviv Oblast, Ukraine

Voloshcha Волоща
- Village
- Location within Lviv Oblast Location within Ukraine
- Coordinates: 49°30′10″N 23°36′12″E
- Country: Ukraine
- Oblast: Lviv
- Raion: Drohobych
- Area: 29 km^{2} (11 sq mi)
- Population: 1,250
  - Density: 43/km^{2} (110/sq mi)

Voloshcha (Ukrainian: Волоща, Polish: Wołoszcza) is a village (selo) in Drohobych Raion, Lviv Oblast, in south-west Ukraine. It belongs to Medenychi settlement hromada, one of the hromadas of Ukraine.

The local Catholic parish was first mentioned in 1425.
