= Bolekhivtsi =

Rural locality in Lviv Oblast, Ukraine

Coordinates: 49°19′N 23°36′E

- Village
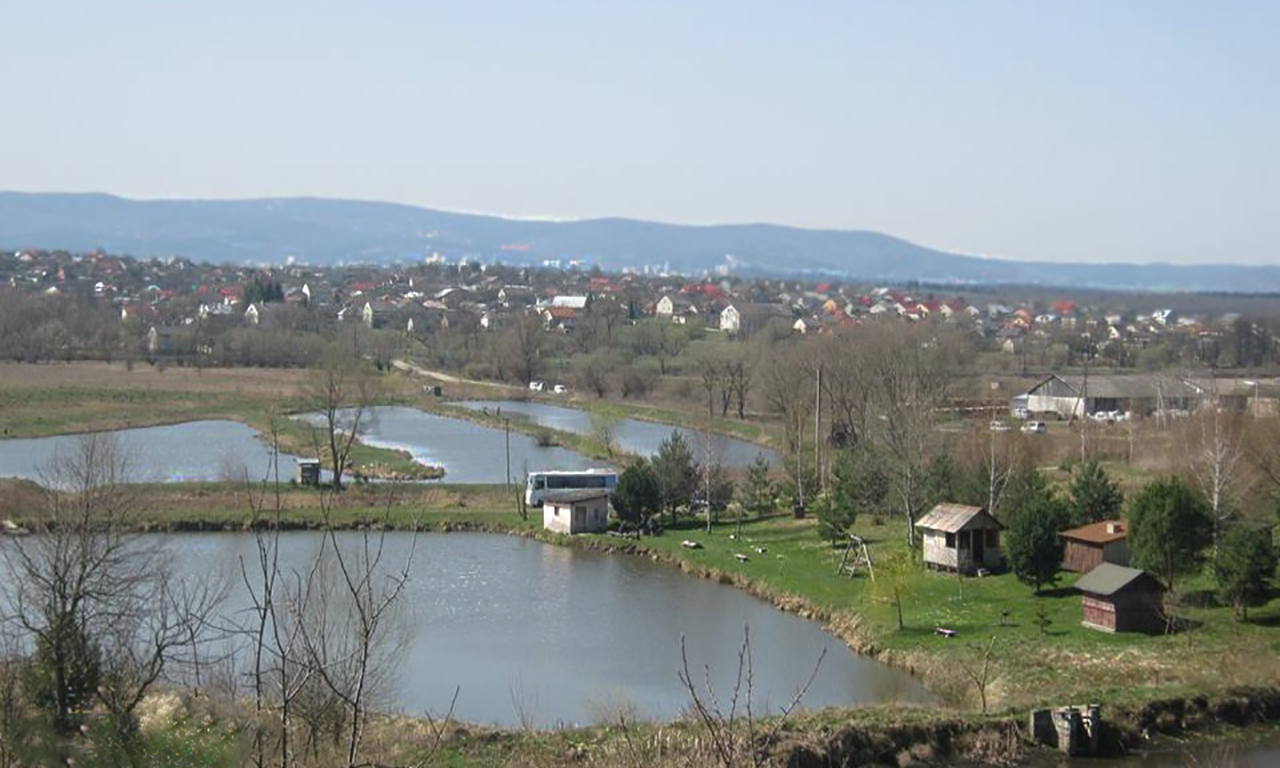
- Interactive map of Bolekhivtsi
- Country: Ukraine
- Oblast: Lviv
- Raion: Drohobych
- Area: 2.8 km^{2} (1.1 sq mi)
- Population: 1 602
  - Density: 572/km^{2} (1,480/sq mi)

Bolekhivtsi (Ukrainian: Болехівці, Polish: Bolechowce) is a village (selo) in Drohobych Raion, Lviv Oblast, in south-west Ukraine. It belongs to Drohobych urban hromada, one of the hromadas of Ukraine.

From 1918 to 1939 the village was in Lwów Voivodeship in Poland.
