= Korytyshche =

Korytyshche (Ukrainian: Коритище) may refer to the following places in Ukraine:

- Korytyshche, Kyiv Oblast, village in Obukhiv Raion, Kyiv Oblast
- Korytyshche, Lviv Oblast, village in Drohobych Raion, Lviv Oblast
- Korytyshche, Sumy Oblast, village in Romny Raion, Sumy Oblast
- Korytyshche, Zhytomyr Oblast, village in Zhytomyr Raion, Zhytomyr Oblast
