= Nove Selo, Drohobych Raion, Lviv Oblast =

Rural locality in Lviv Oblast, Ukraine

Nove Selo Нове Село
- Village
- Location within Ukraine
- Coordinates: 49°20′41″N 23°35′47″E
- Country: Ukraine
- Oblast: Lviv
- Raion: Drohobych

Nove Selo (Ukrainian: Нове Село, German: Neudorf, Polish: Polminowice) is a village (selo) in Drohobych Raion, Lviv Oblast, in west Ukraine. It belongs to Drohobych urban hromada, one of the hromadas of Ukraine.

The village was established in the course of Josephine colonization by German Roman Catholic and Lutheran settlers (see Galician Germans) in 1783.

From 1918 to 1939 the village was in Lwów Voivodeship in Poland. On 17 November 1938 the name was changed from Neudorf to Polminowice. In January 1940 the local German population was moved out (Heim ins Reich), later replaced by Ukrainians.
