= Rykhtychi =

Rural locality in Lviv Oblast, Ukraine

Rykhtychi Рихтичі
- town
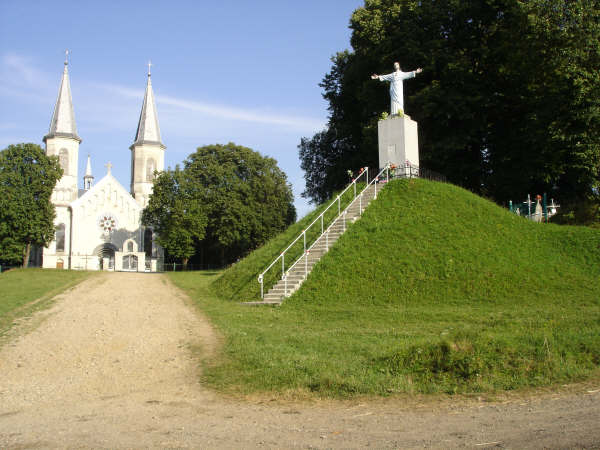
- Church and monument to Jesus Christ

- Location within Lviv Oblast Location within Ukraine
- Coordinates: 49°23′N 23°33′E

Area
  - Total: 3.769 km^{2} (1.455 sq mi)

Population
  - Total: 3,244
  - Density: 860.7/km^{2} (2,229/sq mi)
- Postal code: 82151
- Area code: +380 3244
- Website: Rykhtychi

Rykhtychi (Ukrainian: Рихтичі; Polish: Rychcice) is a selo in Drohobych Raion, Lviv Oblast, Ukraine. It belongs to Drohobych urban hromada, one of the hromadas of Ukraine.

It was first mentioned in 1123 and currently has a population of 3,244.
