= Stupnytsia =

Rural locality in Lviv Oblast, Ukraine

Stupnytsia Ступниця
- Village
- Location within Lviv Oblast Location within Ukraine
- Coordinates: 49°25′53″N 23°19′21″E
- Country: Ukraine
- Oblast: Lviv
- Raion: Drohobych
- Area: 24 km^{2} (9.3 sq mi)
- Population: 553
  - Density: 23/km^{2} (60/sq mi)

Stupnytsia (Ukrainian: Ступниця, Polish: Stupnica) is a village (selo) in Drohobych Raion, Lviv Oblast, in south-west Ukraine. It belongs to Drohobych urban hromada, one of the hromadas of Ukraine.

The village was first mentioned in 1377.
