= Mokriany =

Rural locality in Lviv Oblast, Ukraine

Coordinates: 49°25′9″N 23°16′53″E

Mokriany (Ukrainian: Мокряни) is a village in Drohobych Raion, Lviv Oblast, Ukraine in ZIP code 82125. It belongs to Boryslav urban hromada, one of the hromadas of Ukraine and was founded in the year 1515. As of 2026, the village has a population of 383. The name "Mokrainy" comes from the Ukrainian word мокрий which means wet or damp.
