= Medenychi =

Rural locality in Lviv Oblast, Ukraine

Medenychi Меденичі
- Rural settlement
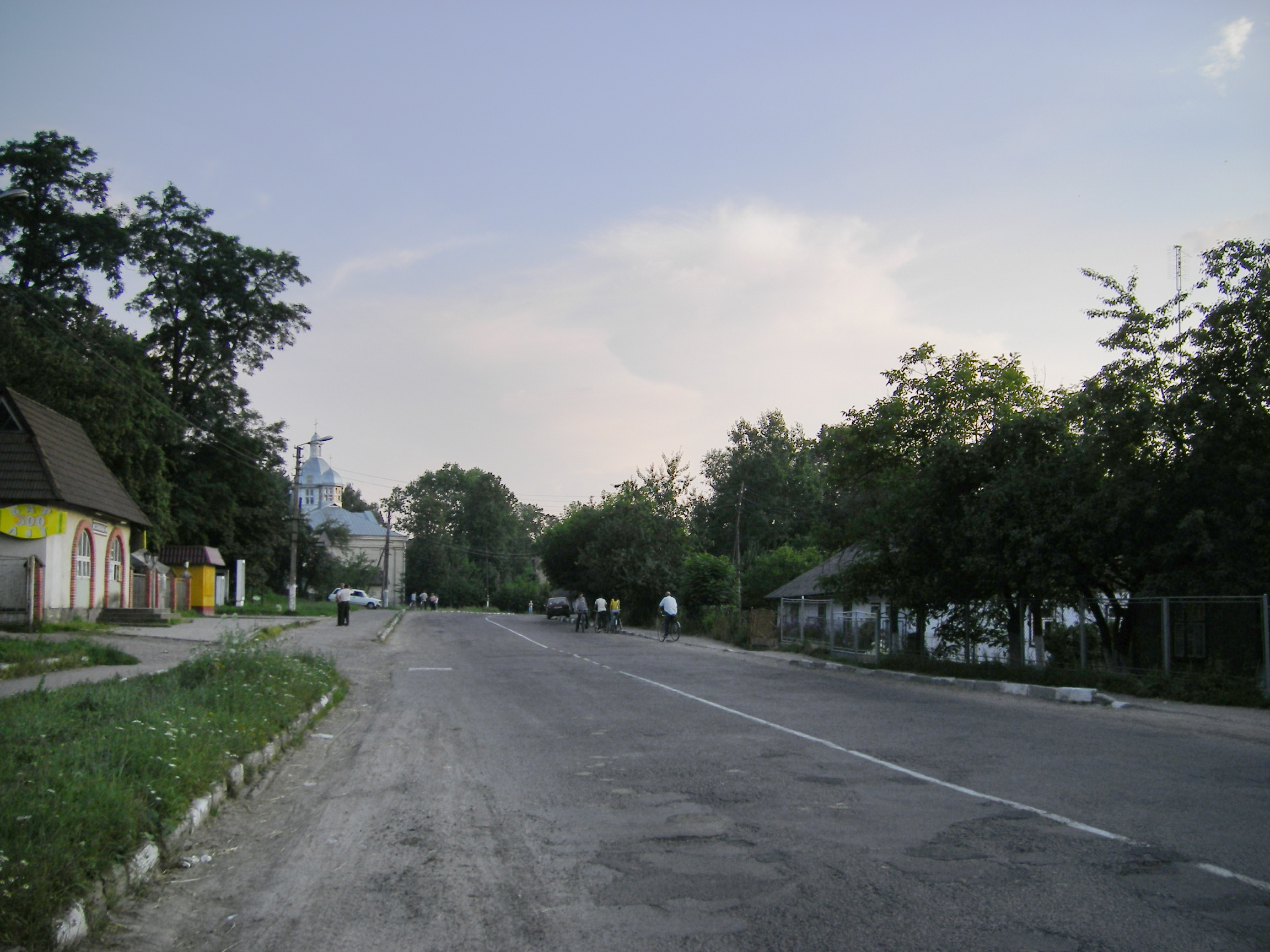
- Main Street of Medenychi

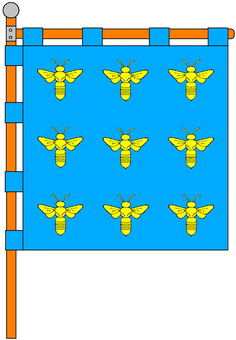
- Flag Coat of arms

- Location within Lviv Oblast
- Coordinates: 49°25′37″N 23°44′45″E
- Country: Ukraine
- Oblast: Lviv Oblast
- Raion: Drohobych Raion
- Hromada: Medenychi settlement hromada
- Established: 1395

Area
  - Total: 600 km^{2} (230 sq mi)
- Elevation /(average value of): 275 m (902 ft)

Population (2022)
  - Total: 3,292
  - Density: 5.5/km^{2} (14/sq mi)
- Time zone: UTC+2 (EET)
  - Summer (DST): UTC+3 (EEST)
- Postal code: 82160, 82161
- Area code: +380 3244
- Website: смт Меденичі ^{(Ukrainian)}

Medenychi (Ukrainian: Меденичі, Polish: Medenice) is a rural settlement in Drohobych Raion (district) of Lviv Oblast (region) in Western Ukraine. It hosts the administration of Medenychi settlement hromada, one of the hromadas of Ukraine. Population: 3,292 (2022 estimate). Local government is administered by Medenychi Settlement Council.

== History ==
The territory was occupied by Germans in early July 1941. Once the territory was occupied by Germans, pogroms against the Jewish community were carried out by locals and continued till spring 1942. In August 1942, most of the Medenychi Jews were sent to the Bełżec extermination camp. According to the Soviet archives and testimonies gathered by Yahad-In Unum, the column of Jews was shot midway between Medenychi and Hirske (Gorskoye). The Jews were shot in small groups in the clay pit, located close to the road. The execution was carried out by Germans.

Until 26 January 2024, Medenychi was designated urban-type settlement. On this day, a new law entered into force which abolished this status, and Medenychi became a rural settlement.
