= Stebnyk =

City in Lviv Oblast, Ukraine

Stebnyk Стебник
- City
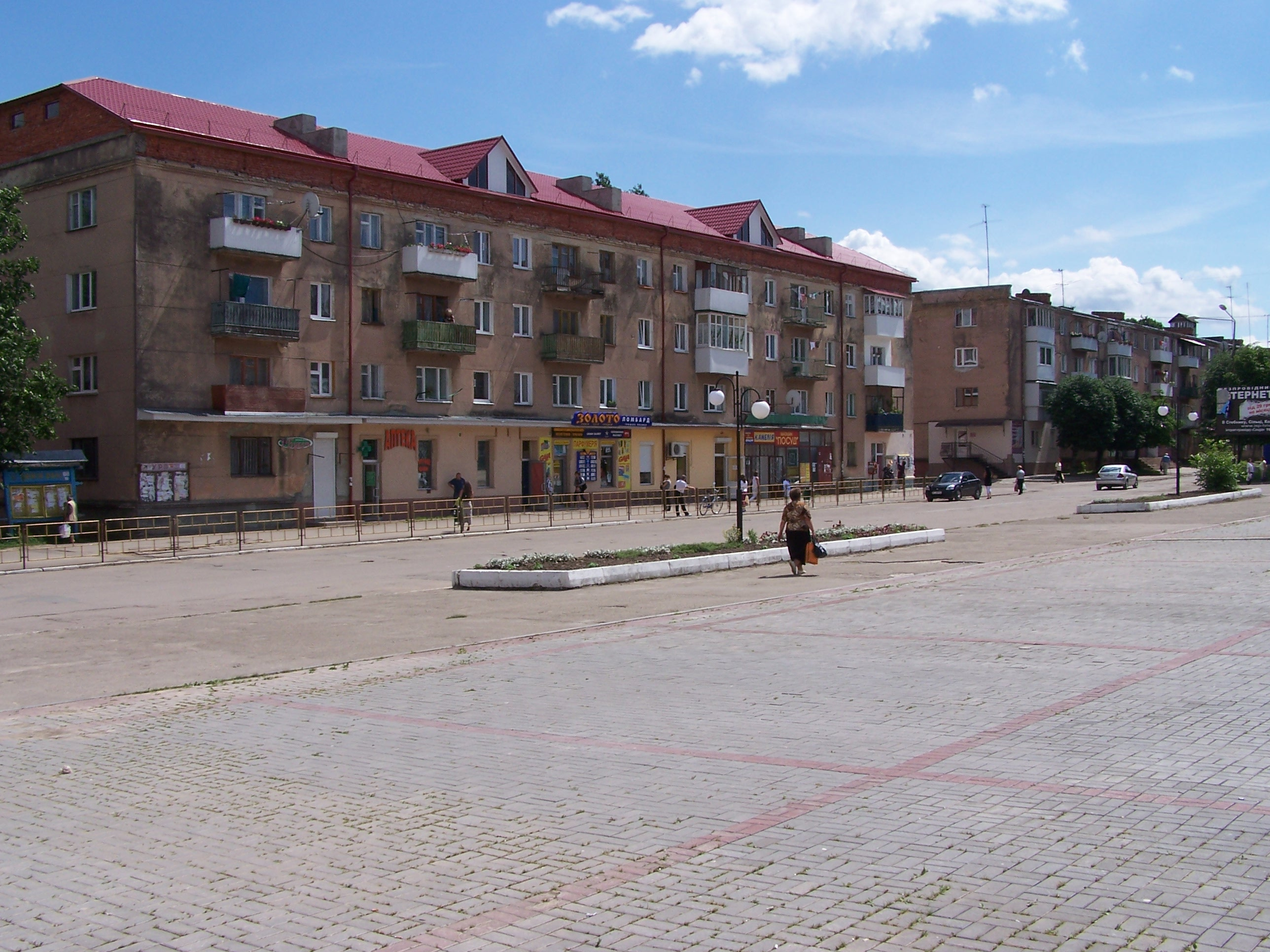
- City center

- Flag Coat of arms

- Location within Ukraine Location within Lviv Oblast
- Coordinates: 49°18′0″N 23°34′0″E
- Country: Ukraine
- Oblast: Lviv Oblast
- Raion: Drohobych Raion
- Hromada: Drohobych urban hromada
- First mentioned: 1440

Area
  - Total: 8.9 km^{2} (3.4 sq mi)
- Elevation: 340 m (1,120 ft)

Population (2022)
  - Total: 20,200
  - Density: 2,300/km^{2} (5,900/sq mi)
- Time zone: UTC+2 (EET)
  - Summer (DST): UTC+3 (EEST)
- Postal code: 82172
- Telephone code: +380-3244
- Website: www.stebnyk-rada.gov.ua

Stebnyk (Ukrainian: Стебник, IPA: [ˈstɛbnɪk]) is a city in Drohobych Raion in Lviv Oblast (province) of western Ukraine, close to the border with Poland. It is located in the Drohobych municipality. It belongs to Drohobych urban hromada, one of the hromadas of Ukraine. Population: 20,200 (2022 estimate).

Until 18 July 2020, Stebnyk belonged to Drohobych Municipality. As part of the administrative reform of Ukraine, which reduced the number of raions of Lviv Oblast to seven, Drohobych Municipality was merged into Drohobych Raion.

== See also ==
- TESP (company)
