= Zaluzhany, Drohobych Raion =

Rural locality in Lviv Oblast, Ukraine

Zaluzhany Залужани
- Village
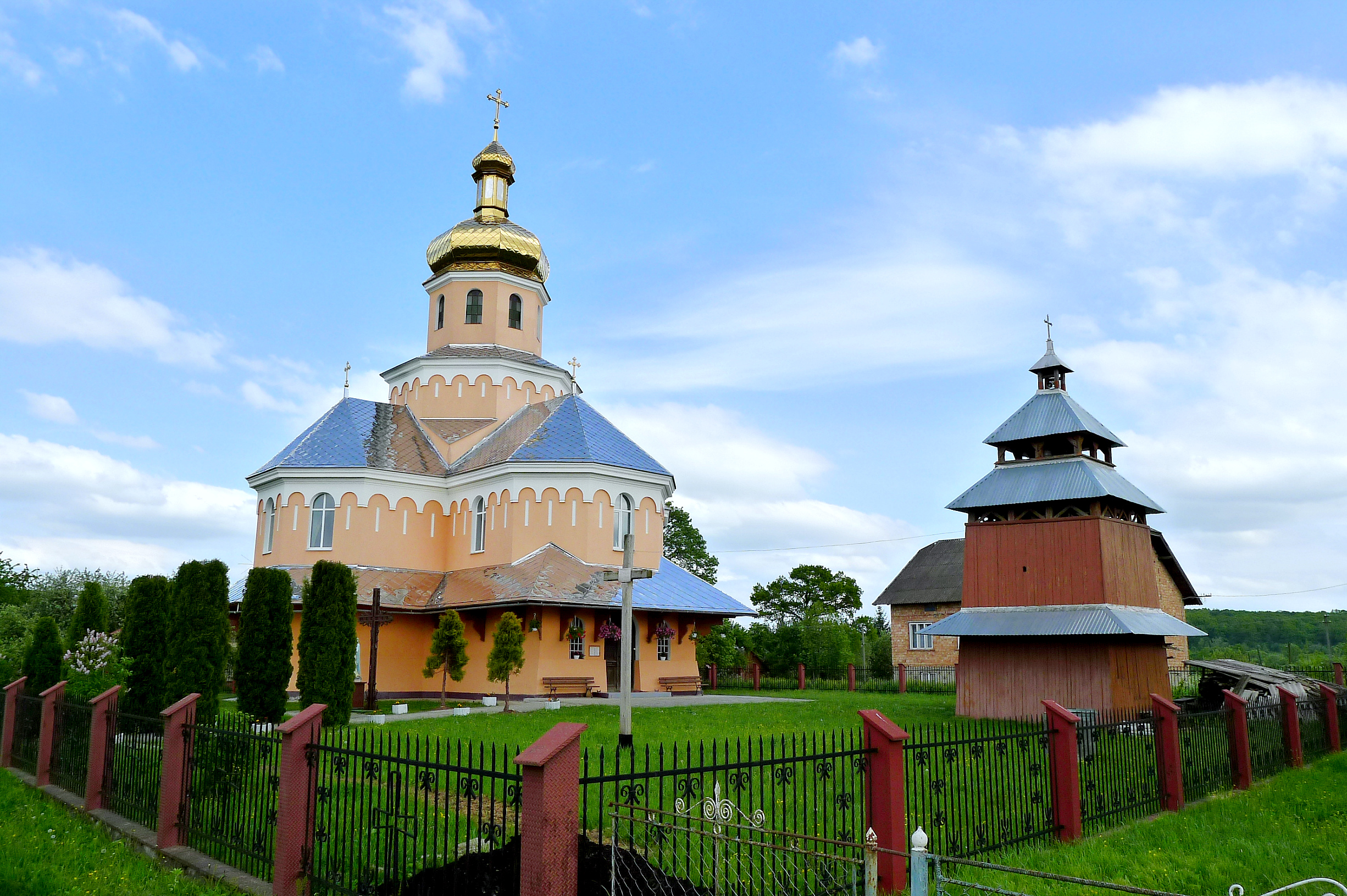

- Location within Ukraine
- Coordinates: 49°23′51″N 23°31′30″E
- Country: Ukraine
- Oblast: Lviv
- Raion: Drohobych
- Area: 0.907 km^{2} (0.350 sq mi)
- Population: 787
  - Density: 868/km^{2} (2,250/sq mi)

Zaluzhany (Ukrainian: Залужани, before 1946 – Vatsevychi) is a village (selo) in Drohobych Raion, Lviv Oblast, in Western Ukraine. It belongs to Drohobych urban hromada, one of the hromadas of Ukraine.

== History ==
The local Catholic parish was first mentioned in 1410.
