= Rivne, Lviv Oblast =

Rural locality in Lviv Oblast, Ukraine

Rivne Рівне Königsau Równe
- Village
- Location within Lviv Oblast Location within Ukraine
- Coordinates: 49°22′49″N 23°45′50″E
- Country: Ukraine
- Oblast: Lviv Oblast
- Raion: Drohobych
- Area: 0.676 km^{2} (0.261 sq mi)
- Population: 200
  - Density: 300/km^{2} (770/sq mi)

Rivne (Ukrainian: Рівне, German: Königsau, Polish: Równe) is a village (selo) in Drohobych Raion, Lviv Oblast, in west Ukraine. It belongs to Medenychi settlement hromada, one of the hromadas of Ukraine.

The village was established in the course of Josephine colonization by German Roman Catholic settlers in 1783. It was arranged in an unusual manner, within a pentagon, the only such colony in Galicia. In the planning process the village was to have a Catholic church built, which, however, did not happen until 1846.

From 1918 to 1939 the village was in Lwów Voivodeship in Poland. In 1936 the name of the municipality was changed to Równe. In January 1940 the local German population was moved out (Heim ins Reich), later replaced by Ukrainians.
