= Korytyshche, Kyiv Oblast =

Korytyshche Коритище
- Village
- Location within Ukraine Location within Kyiv Oblast
- Coordinates: 49°47′47″N 30°59′33″E
- Country: Ukraine
- Oblast: Kyiv
- Raion: Obukhiv
- Founded: 1600
- Area: 15.9 km^{2} (6.1 sq mi)
- Elevation: 162 m (531 ft)
- Population (2001): 238
  - Density: 15.0/km^{2} (38.8/sq mi)
- Time zone: UTC+2 (EET)
  - Summer (DST): UTC+3 (EEST)
- Postal code: 08800
- Area code: +380 4574

Korytyshche (Ukrainian: Коритище) is a village (selo) in Obukhiv Raion, Kyiv Oblast, in south-west Ukraine. It belongs to Myronivka urban hromada, one of the hromadas of Ukraine.

Until 18 July 2020, Korytyshche belonged to Myronivka Raion. The raion was abolished that day as part of the administrative reform of Ukraine, which reduced the number of raions of Kyiv Oblast to seven. The area of Myronivka Raion was merged into Obukhiv Raion.
