= Drohobych Raion =

Subdivision of Lviv Oblast, Ukraine

Drohobych Raion Дрогобицький район
- Raion
- Flag Coat of arms

- Interactive map of Drohobych Raion
- Coordinates: 49°20′26″N 23°27′21″E
- Country: Ukraine
- Oblast: Lviv Oblast
- Established: December 4, 1959
- Admin. center: Drohobych
- Subdivisions: 5 hromadas

Government
  - Governor: Stepan Kulyniak

Area
  - Total: 1,493 km^{2} (576 sq mi)

Population (2022)
  - Total: 232,947
  - Density: 156.0/km^{2} (404.1/sq mi)
- Time zone: UTC+02:00 (EET)
  - Summer (DST): UTC+03:00 (EEST)
- Area code: 380-244
- Website: rajon.drohobych.com.ua

Drohobych Raion (Ukrainian: Дрогобицький район, romanized: Drohobytskyi raion) is a raion (district) of Lviv Oblast (region) of western Ukraine. Its administrative center is Drohobych. Population: 232,947 (2022 estimate).

On 18 July 2020, as part of the administrative reform of Ukraine, the number of raions of Lviv Oblast was reduced to seven, and the area of Drohobych Raion was significantly expanded. Boryslav and Drohobych municipalities, as well as the city of Truskavets, which was previously incorporated as a city of oblast significance, were merged into Drohobych Raion. The January 2020 estimate of the raion population was 51,152 (2020 est.).

== History ==
In 2020, the district included the Lastivka (with the villages of Lastivka, Svydnyk and Korytyshche) and Holovske (with the villages of Holovske, Zubrytsia and Kryntyata) village councils of the Turka district and the Oriv (with the villages of Oriv and Zymivky) village council of the Skole district.

== Subdivisions ==
=== Current ===
After the reform in July 2020, the raion consisted of 5 hromadas:

- Boryslav urban hromada with the administration in the city of Boryslav, transferred from Boryslav Municipality;
- Drohobych urban hromada with the administration in the city of Drohobych, transferred from Drohobych Municipality;
- Medenychi settlement hromada with the administration in the rural settlement of Medenychi, retained from Drohobych Raion;
- Skhidnytsia settlement hromada with the administration in the rural settlement of Skhidnytsia, transferred from Boryslav Municipality;
- Truskavets urban hromada with the administration in the city of Truskavets, transferred from the city of oblast significance of Truskavets.

=== Before 2020 ===
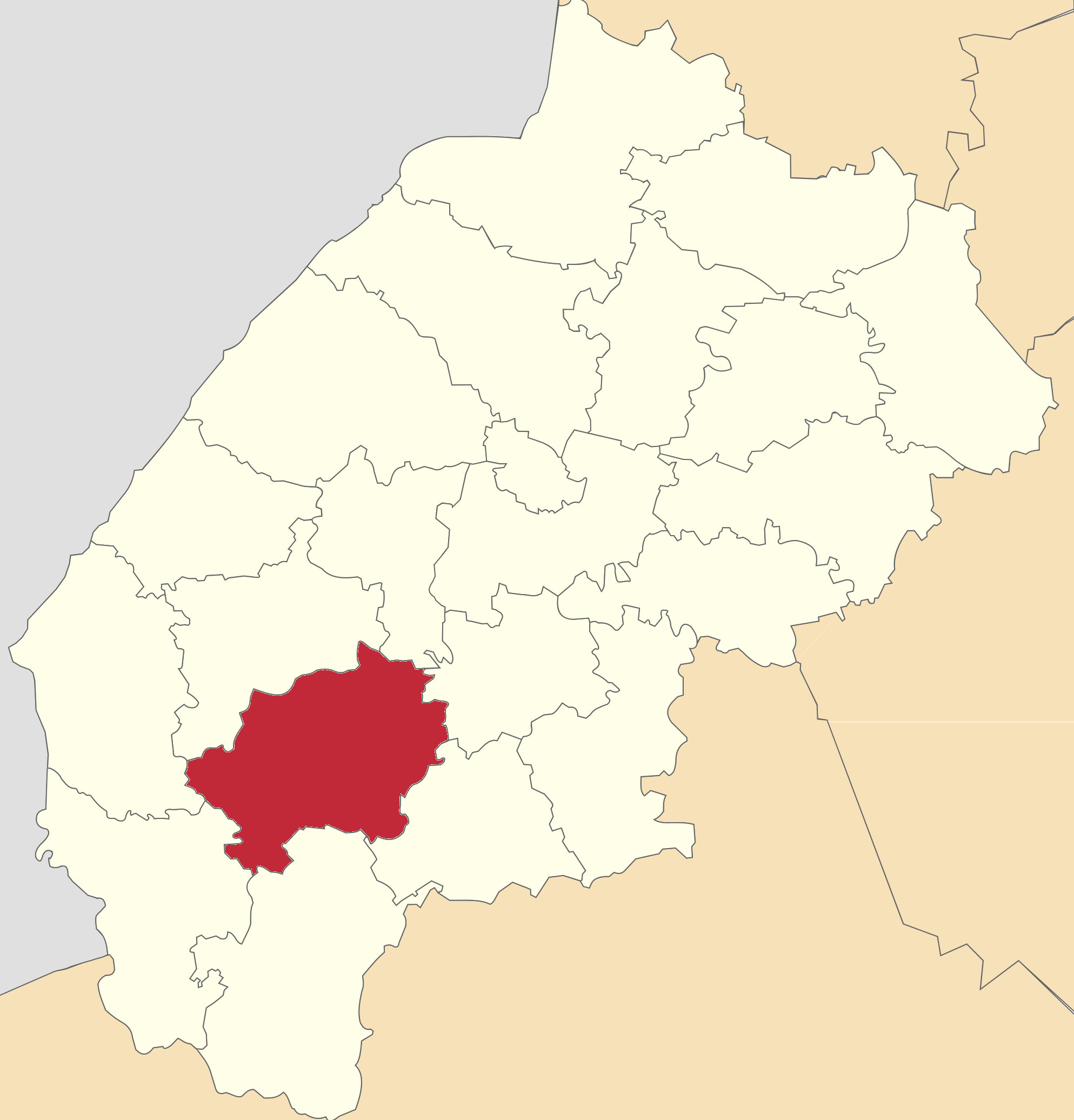
Drohobych Raion in Lviv Oblast (1966-2020)

Before the 2020 reform, the raion consisted of one hromada, Medenychi settlement hromada with the administration in Medenychi.

== Settlements ==
There are 82 villages, 3 rural settlements and 4 towns in Drohobych Raion.

The towns are:

- Boryslav
- Drohobych
- Stebnyk
- Truskavets

The rural settlements:

- Medenychi
- Pidbuzh
- Skhidnytsia

The villages (Ukrainian: selo) of Drohobych Raion include:

- Biinychi
- Bolekhivtsi
- Bronytsia
- Bykiv
- Bystryi
- Bystrytsia
- Bystrytsia Hirska
- Hlynne
- Holovske
- Hrushiv
- Huta
- Daliava
- Derezhychi
- Drobrohostiv
- Dobrivliany
- Dolishnii Luzhok
- Dovhe
- Dovhe
- Horodkivka
- Hrushiv
- Khatky
- Korosnytsia
- Korytyshche
- Kotovane
- Kryntiata
- Lastivka
- Letnia
- Litynia
- Lishnia
- Maidan
- Medenychi
- Medvezha
- Mykhailevychi
- Modrychi
- Mokriany
- Monastyr Derezhytskyi
- Monastyr Lishnianskyi
- Nahuievychi
- Nove Selo
- Novoshychi
- Novyi Kropyvnyk
- Nyzhni Hai
- Opaka
- Opory
- Oriv
- Ortynychi
- Pereprostynia
- Pidmonastyrok
- Pidsukhe
- Popeli
- Pochaievychi
- Ranevychi
- Ripchytsi
- Rivne
- Rybnyk
- Rykhtychi
- Roliv
- Rivne
- Selets
- Smilna
- Sniatynka
- Solonske
- Stanylia
- Stare Selo
- Staryi Kropyvnyk
- Storona
- Stupnytsia
- Svydnyk
- Tyniv
- Ulychne
- Uniatychi
- Urizh
- Verkhni Hai
- Verkhniy Dorozhiv
- Volia Yakubova
- Voloshcha
- Voroblevychi
- Vynnyky
- Yasenytsia-Silna
- Zady
- Zalokot
- Zaluzhany
- Zhdanivka
- Zubrytsia
- Zymivky

== See also ==
- Administrative divisions of Lviv Oblast
