= Drohobych urban hromada =

Urban hromada in Lviv Oblast, Ukraine

Drohobych urban hromada Дрогобицька міська громада
- Hromada
- Seal

- Location within Lviv Oblast Location within Ukraine
- Coordinates: 49°21′00″N 23°30′00″E
- Country: Ukraine
- Oblast (province): Lviv Oblast
- Raion (district): Drohobych Raion

Area
  - Total: 426.2 km^{2} (164.6 sq mi)

Population (2022)
  - Total: 120,404

Drohobych urban hromada (Ukrainian: Дрогобицька міська громада, romanized: Drohobytska miska hromada) is a hromada (municipality) in Lviv Oblast, in western Ukraine. The hromada's administrative centre is the city of Drohobych.

Drohobych urban hromada has an area of 426.2 square kilometres (164.6 mi^{2}), with a population of 120,404 (2022 estimate).

Until 18 July 2020, the city of Drohobych was designated as a city of oblast significance and belonged to its own municipality, rather than Drohobych Raion, which it also served as the capital of. As part of the administrative reform of Ukraine, which reduced the number of raions of Lviv Oblast to seven, Drohobych became part of Drohobych Raion.

== Settlements ==
In addition to two cities (Drohobych and Stebnyk), the Drohobych urban hromada is home to 32 villages:

- Bystrytsia
- Bykiv
- Hlynne
- Novoshychi
- Ortynychi
- Bolekhivtsi
- Nove Selo
- Bronytsia
- Verkhni Hayi
- Volia Yakubova
- Derezhychi
- Monastyr-Derezhytskyi
- Dobrivliany
- Dolishnii Luzhok
- Lishnia
- Monastyr-Lishnianskyi
- Medvezha
- Mykhailevychi
- Nahuievychi
- Nyzhni Hayi
- Biynychi
- Pochayevychi
- Ranevychi
- Rykhtychi
- Khatky
- Sniatynka
- Zaluzhany
- Stare Selo
- Stupnytsia
- Kotovane
- Selets
- Uniatychi
