= Kavske =

Rural locality in Lviv Oblast, Ukraine

Kavske Кавське
- Village
- Location within Lviv Oblast
- Coordinates: 49°21′37″N 23°48′12″E
- Country: Ukraine
- Oblast: Lviv Oblast
- District: Stryi Raion
- Established: 1334

Area
  - Total: 266 km^{2} (103 sq mi)
- Elevation /(average value of): 282 m (925 ft)

Population
  - Total: 1,453
  - Density: 5,462/km^{2} (14,150/sq mi)
- Time zone: UTC+2 (EET)
  - Summer (DST): UTC+3 (EEST)
- Postal code: 82420
- Area code: +380 3245
- Website: село Кавське ^{(Ukrainian)}

Kavske (Ukrainian: Ка́вське) is a village in Stryi Raion, Lviv Oblast in western Ukraine. It belongs to Stryi urban hromada, one of the hromadas of Ukraine. Local government is administered by the Kavska village council. The village's population is about 1,453 people.

== Geography ==
The village is located on the road from Uhersko to the small town Medenychi. It is located 70 kilometres (43 mi) from the regional center Lviv, 17 kilometres (11 mi) from the district center Stryi and 10 kilometres (6.2 mi) from Medenychi.

== History and Attractions ==
The earliest written mention dates back to 1334. In Kavske, ANCIENT RUSS STRENGTHENED SETTLEMENTS, 11 — 18 centuries, is preserved (Bych and Yosypovychi). Archaeological excavations have also revealed traces of Stone Age settlements (third millennium BC).

== Famous people ==
- Jeremiah Lomnytskyj (February 8, 1860 – July 3, 1916) – Ukrainian Basilian priest, missionary and an educational and church activist, the founder of the religious congregation of the Sisters Servants of Mary Immaculate. Servant of God.

== Literature ==
- Ukrainian: Історія міст і сіл УРСР : Львівська область. – К. : ГРУРЕ, 1968 р., сторінка 834
