= Bukovytsia =

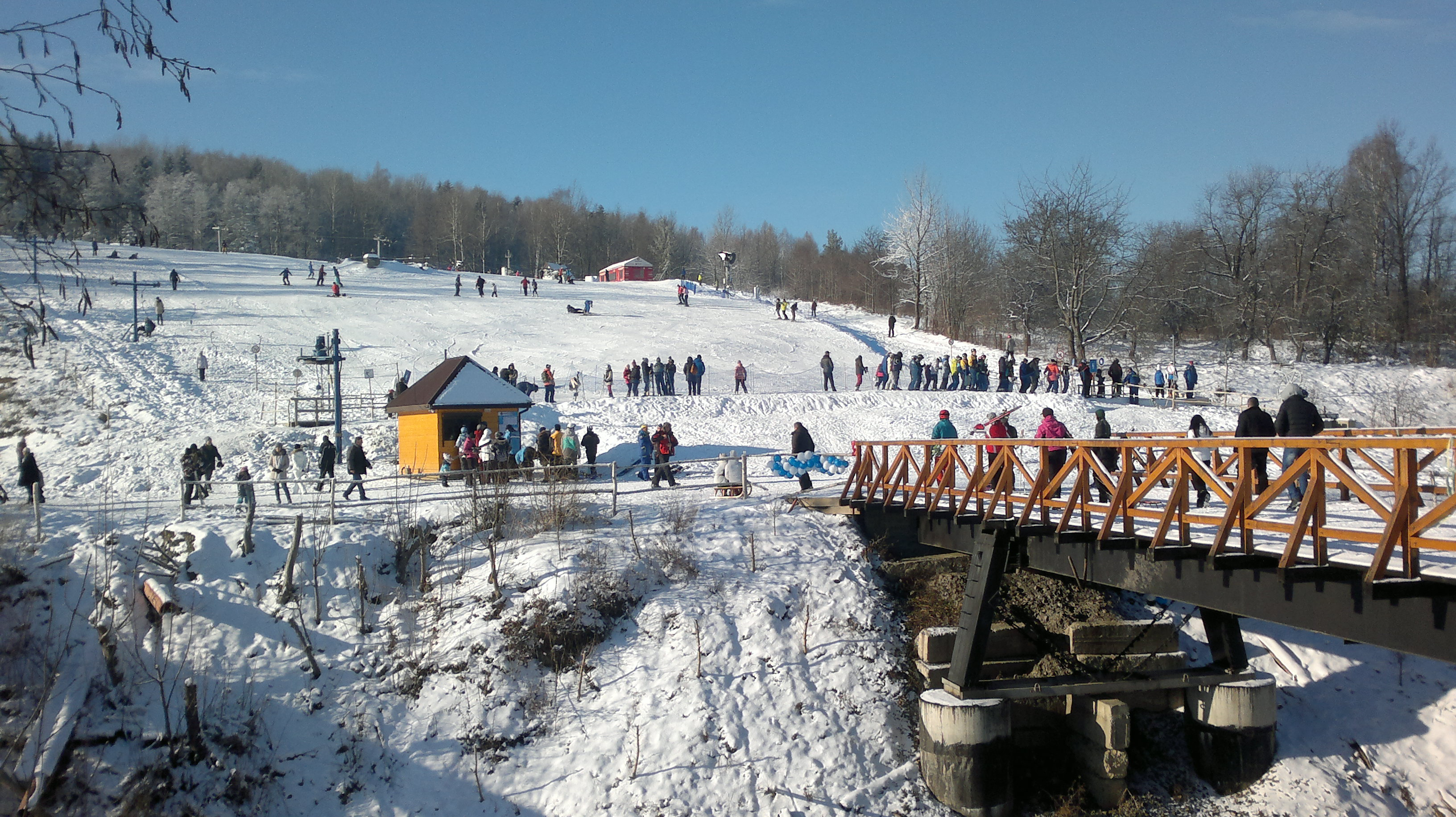
- General view
- Interactive map of Bukovytsia
- Nearest city: Boryslav
- Coordinates: 49°16′23″N 23°27′3″E
- Vertical: 161 m (528 ft)
- Top elevation: 564 m (1,850 ft)
- Base elevation: 403 m (1,322 ft)
- Longest run: 1,050 m (3,440 ft)
- Lift system: 3 lifts
- Lift capacity: 2,000 passengers/hr
- Website: bukovytsia.com

Bukovytsia is a ski resort in the Eastern Beskyd Carpathian forests of Ukraine. It is located in Boryslav. The first mentions about winter sports for this resort are from the times of the Austro-Hungarian Empire. The official opening took place on January 5, 2016.

== Geography ==
The highest point of the resort is Bukovytsіa mountain. The top is 564 meters above sea level. The complex is located in a densely populated district of the Lviv area.

The nearest population centers are Truskavets (7.4 km), Skhidnytsia (17.5 km), Drohobych (16.2 km) and Stryi (41 km).

== Ski lifts and runs ==
The runs are located on Bukovytsіa mountain. The slopes are located on the north side and maximally protected from sunlight, which prolongs the ski season. The longest run is 1,050 meters, the maximum vertical is 160 meters. The runs are equipped with snow cannons, and to ensure safe and enjoyable skiing, the slopes are prepared with special techniques meeting all international standards.

The three ski lifts at "Bukovytsіa" are Doppelmayr (700 meters), Tatrapoma (300 meters) and Multilift (200 meters),

== Ski school ==
The ski school helps students improve their skills. This ski school has experienced trainers and modern facilities.

== Sport club "Boryslav Snowflake" ==
Boryslav's sport club is named "Boryslav Snowflake". The main purpose of the club is to educate a healthy and strong generation of future champions.

== Gallery ==
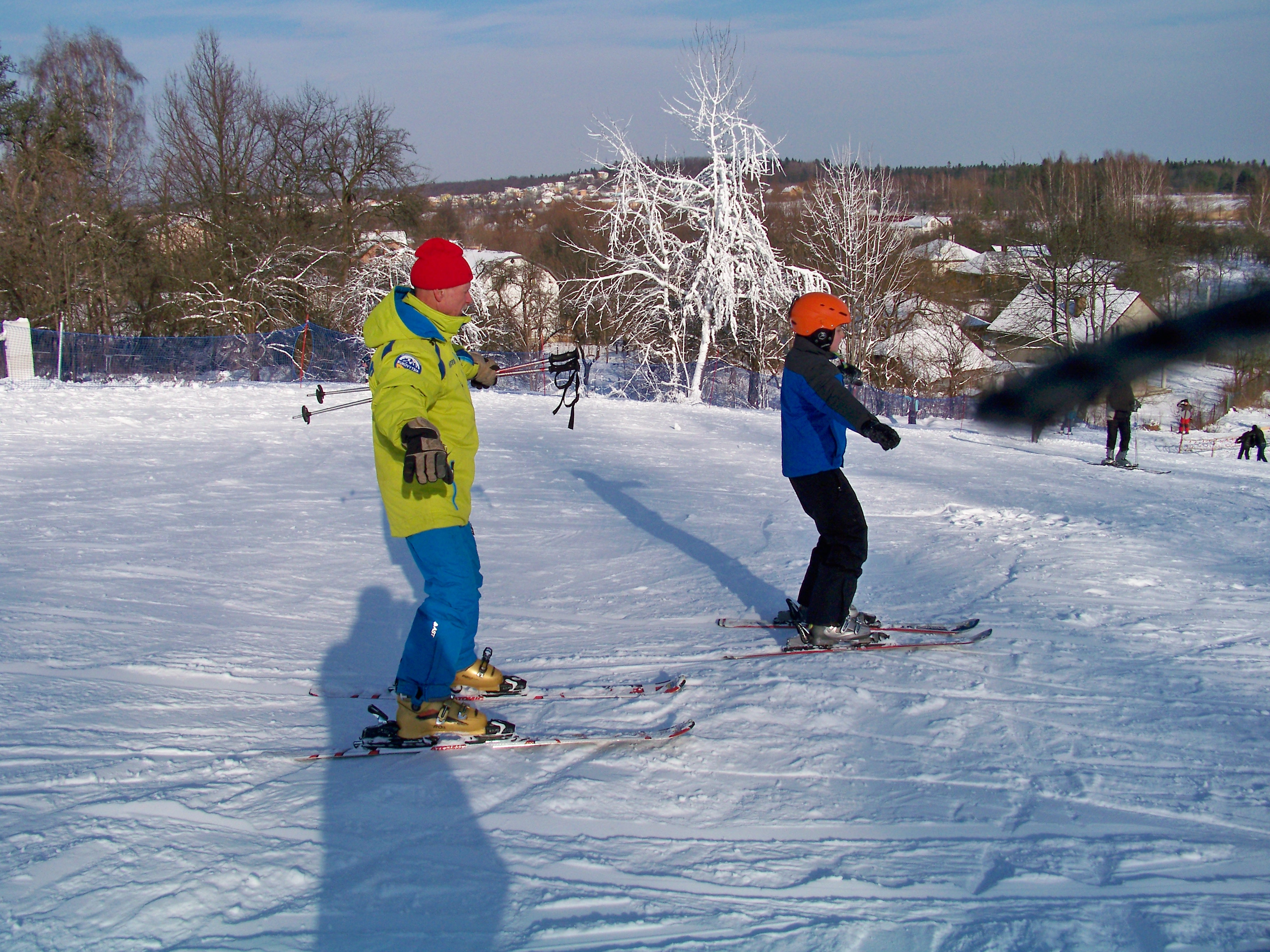

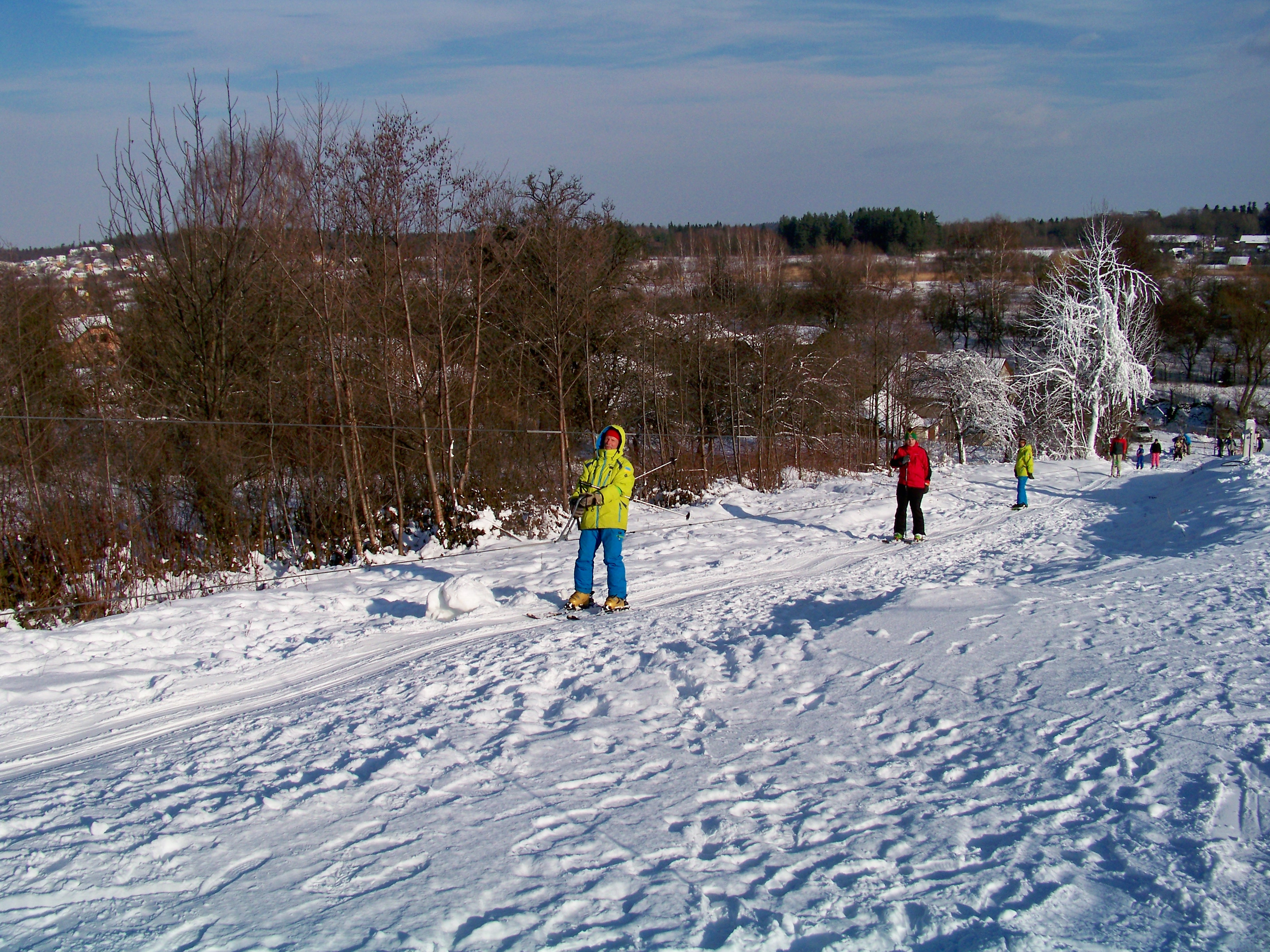

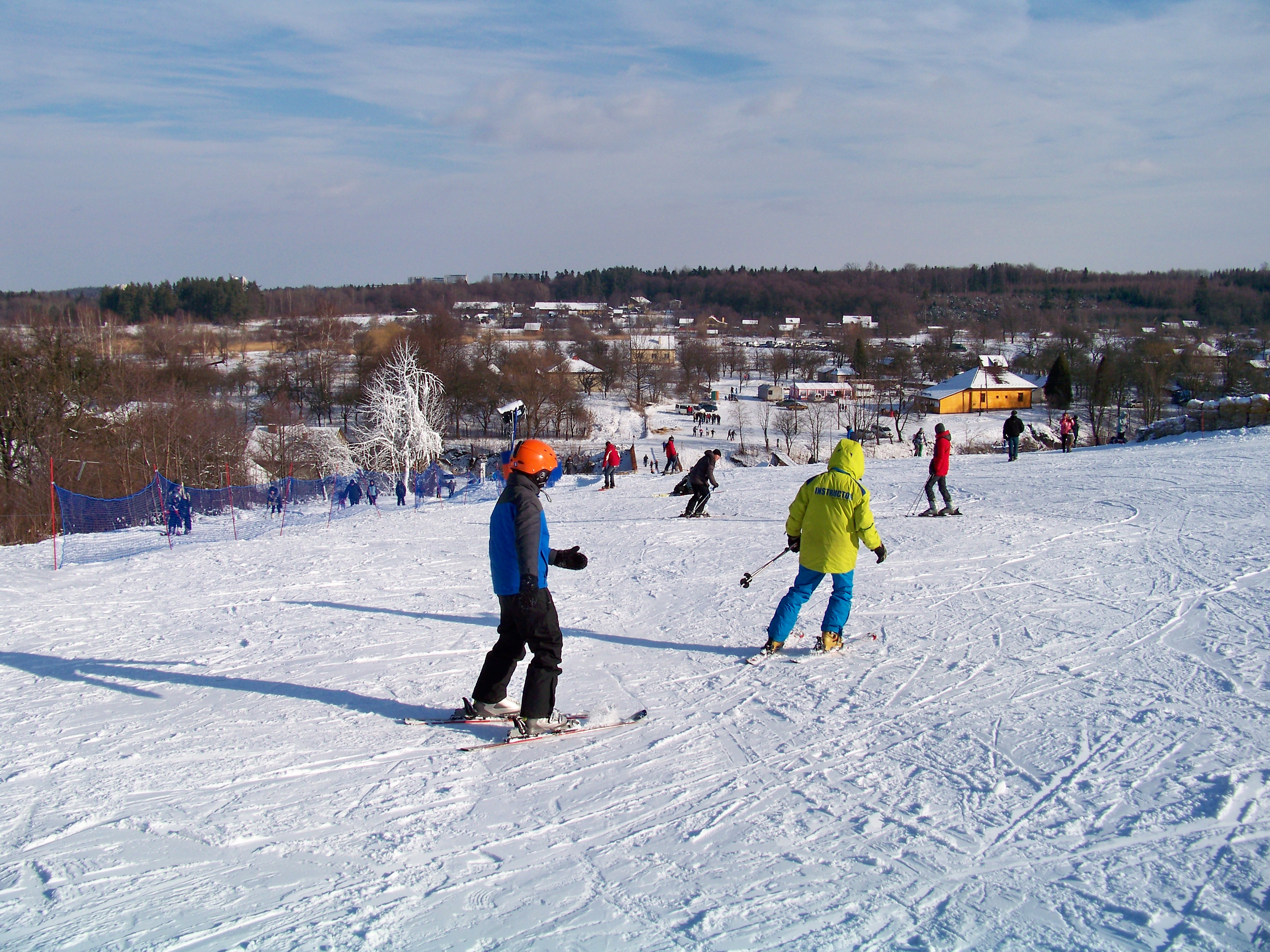

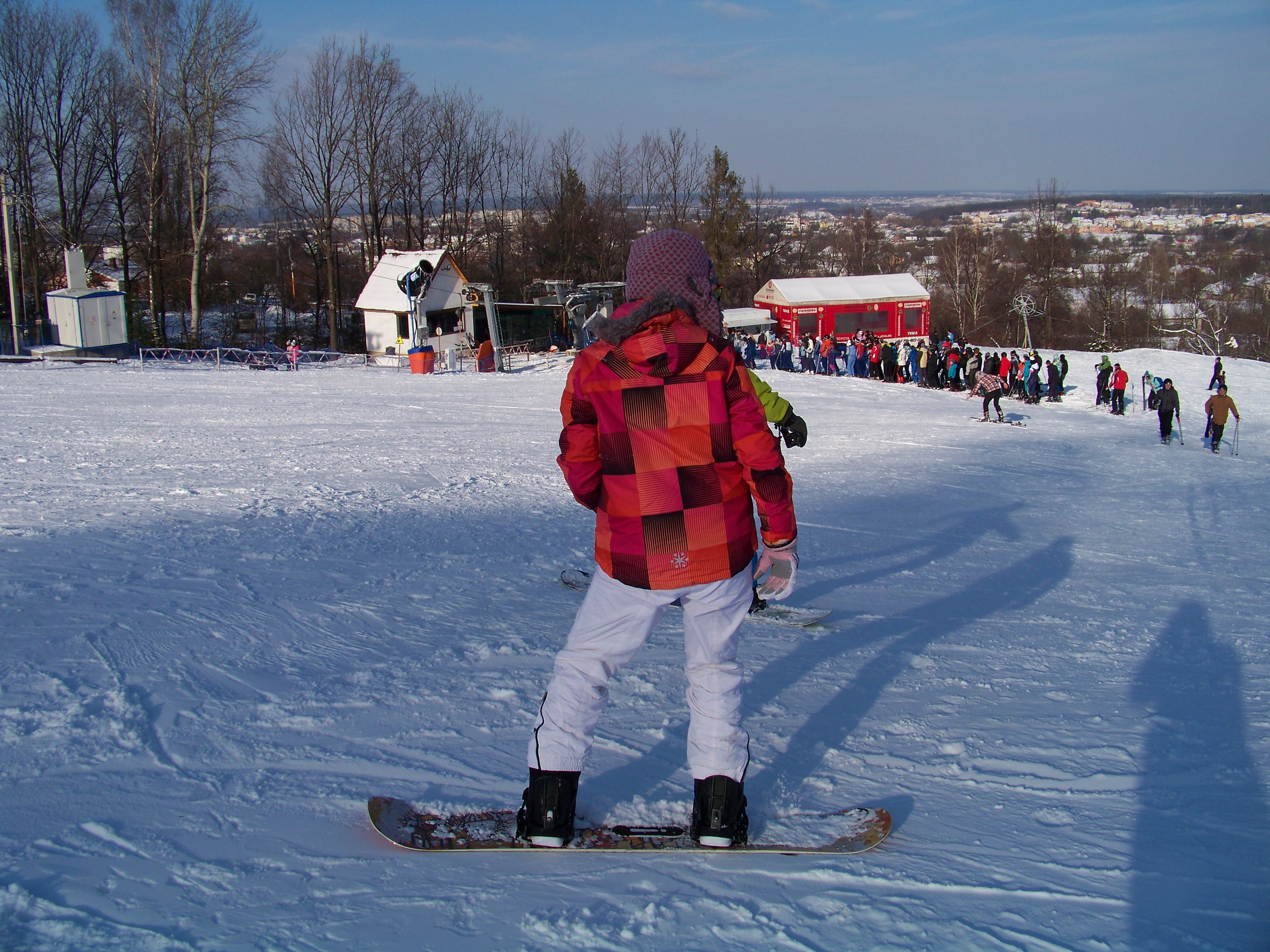

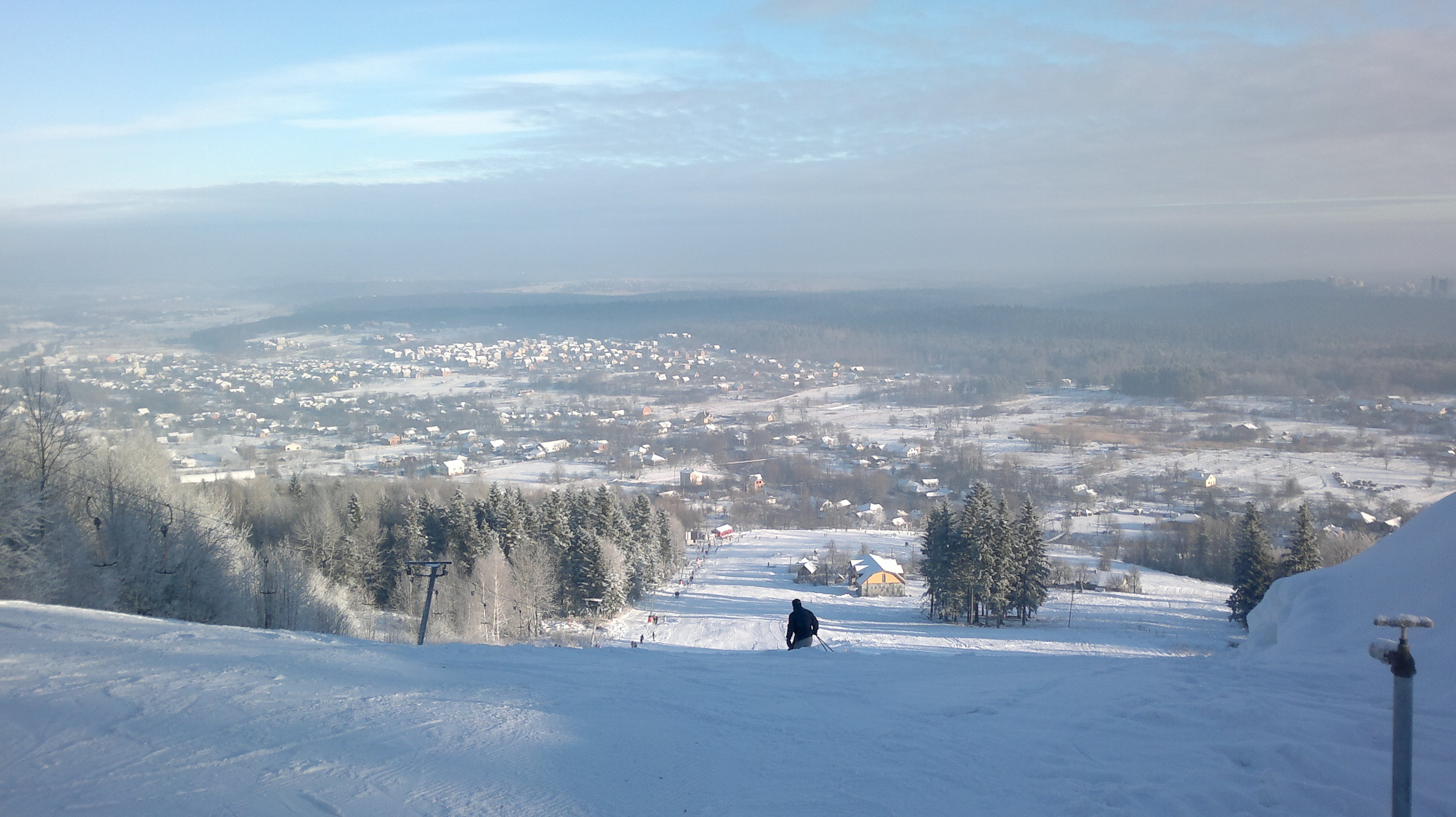

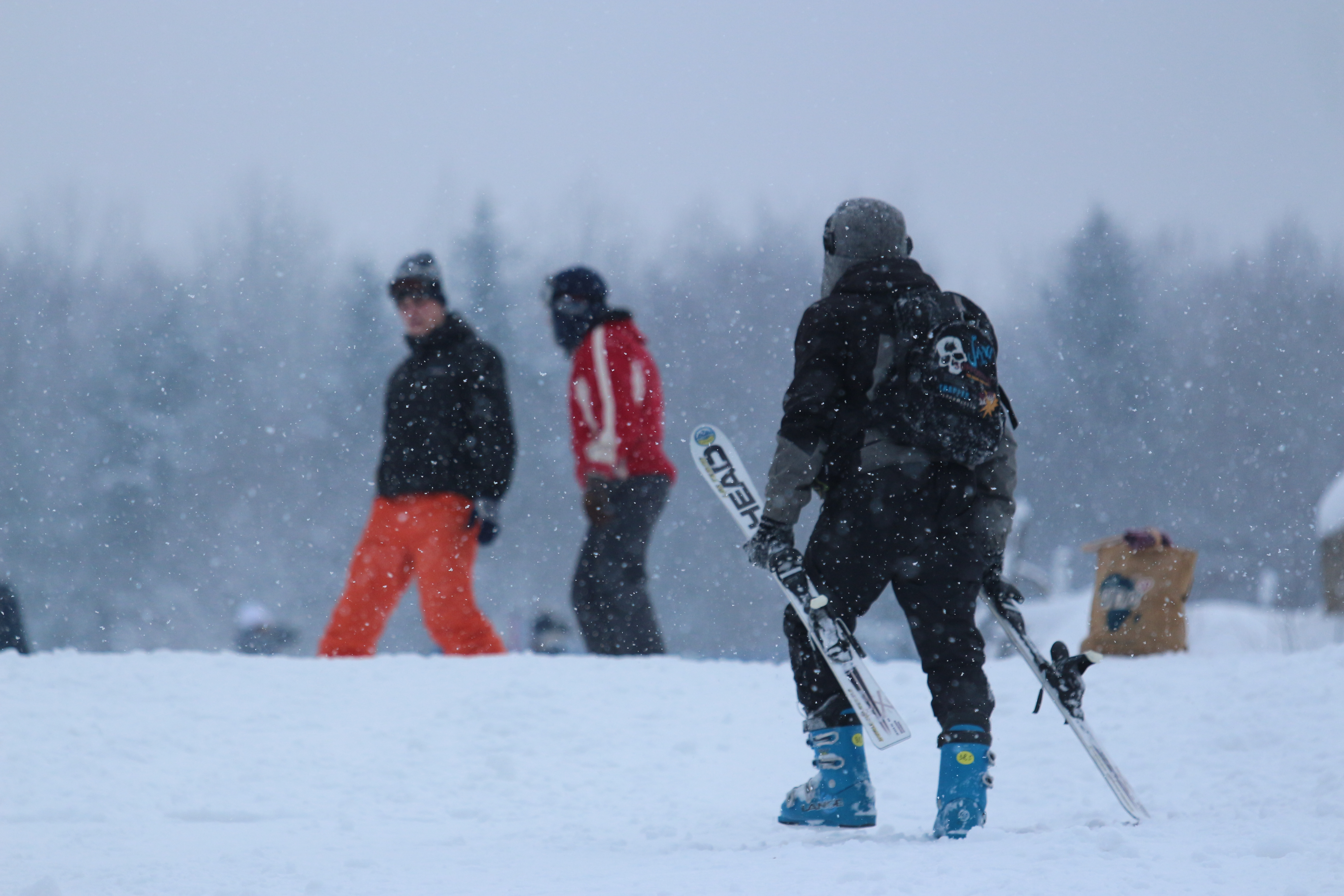

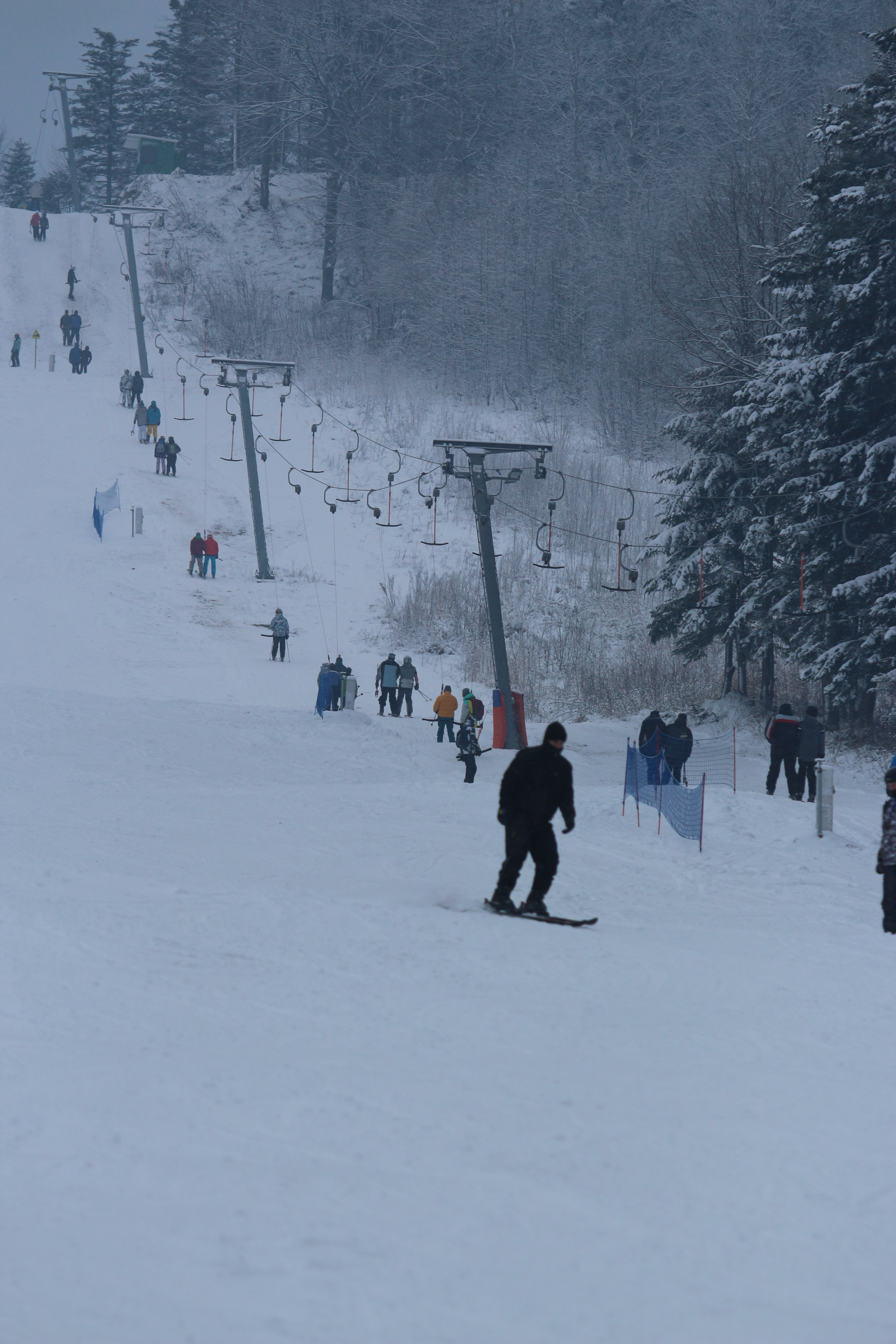

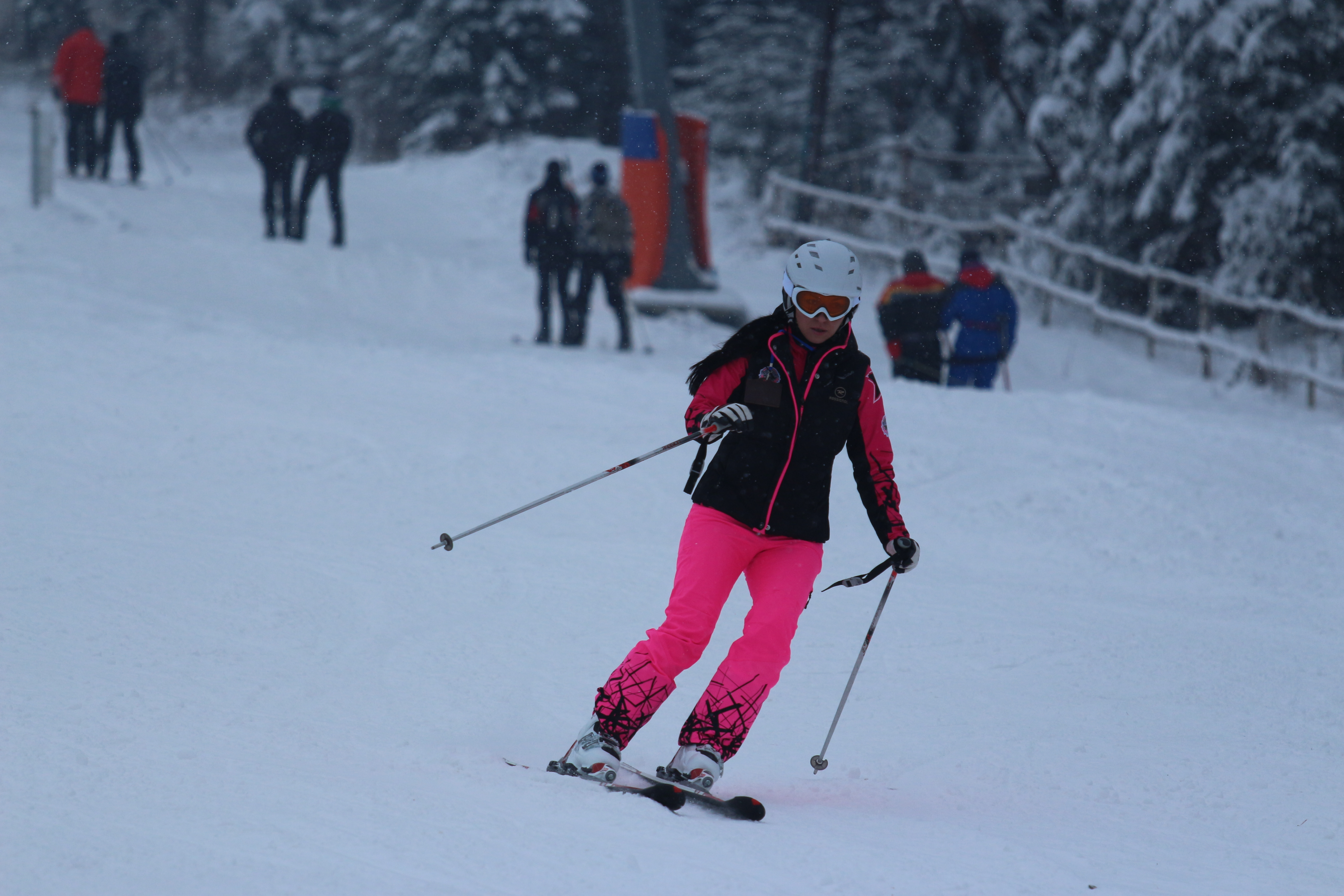

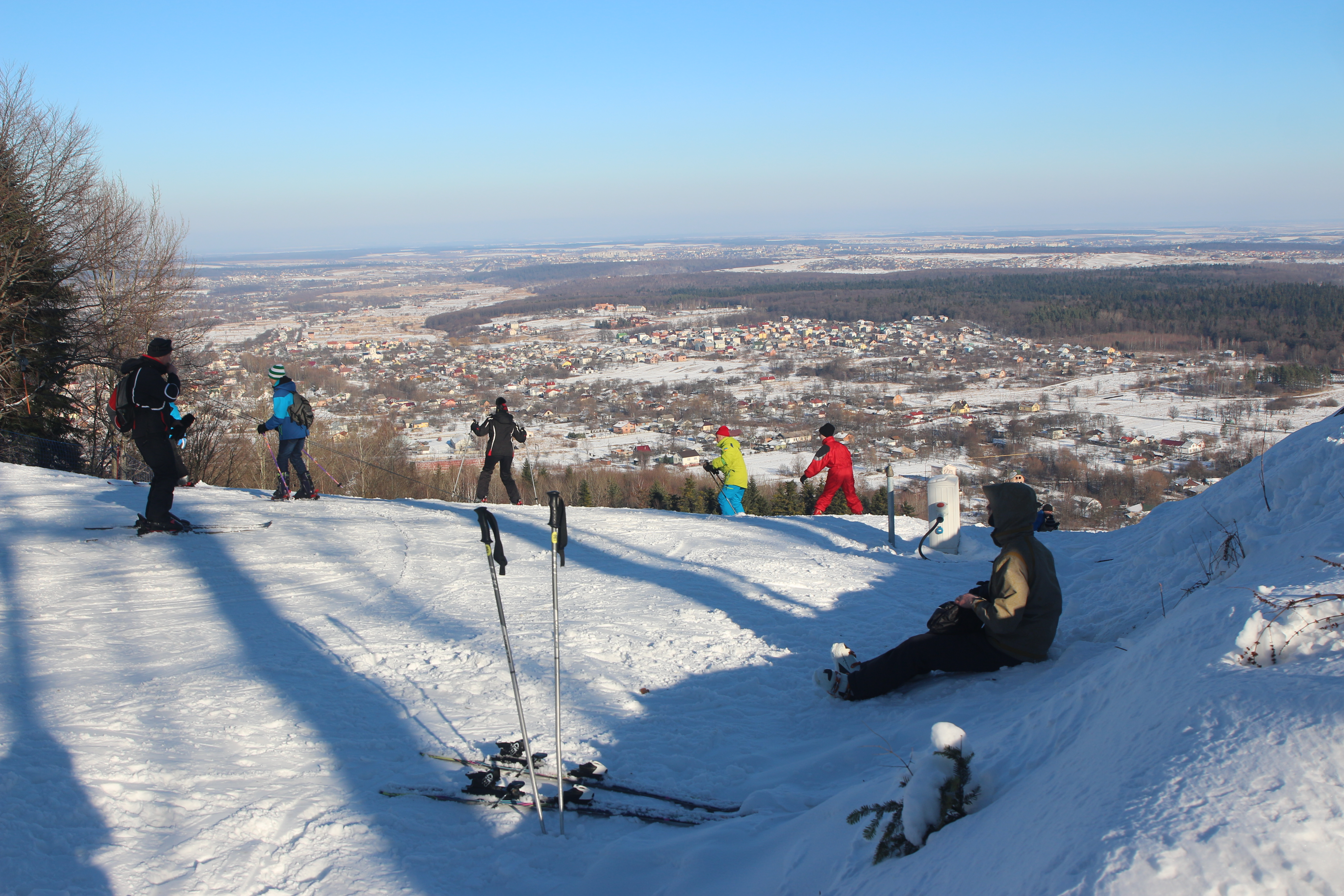

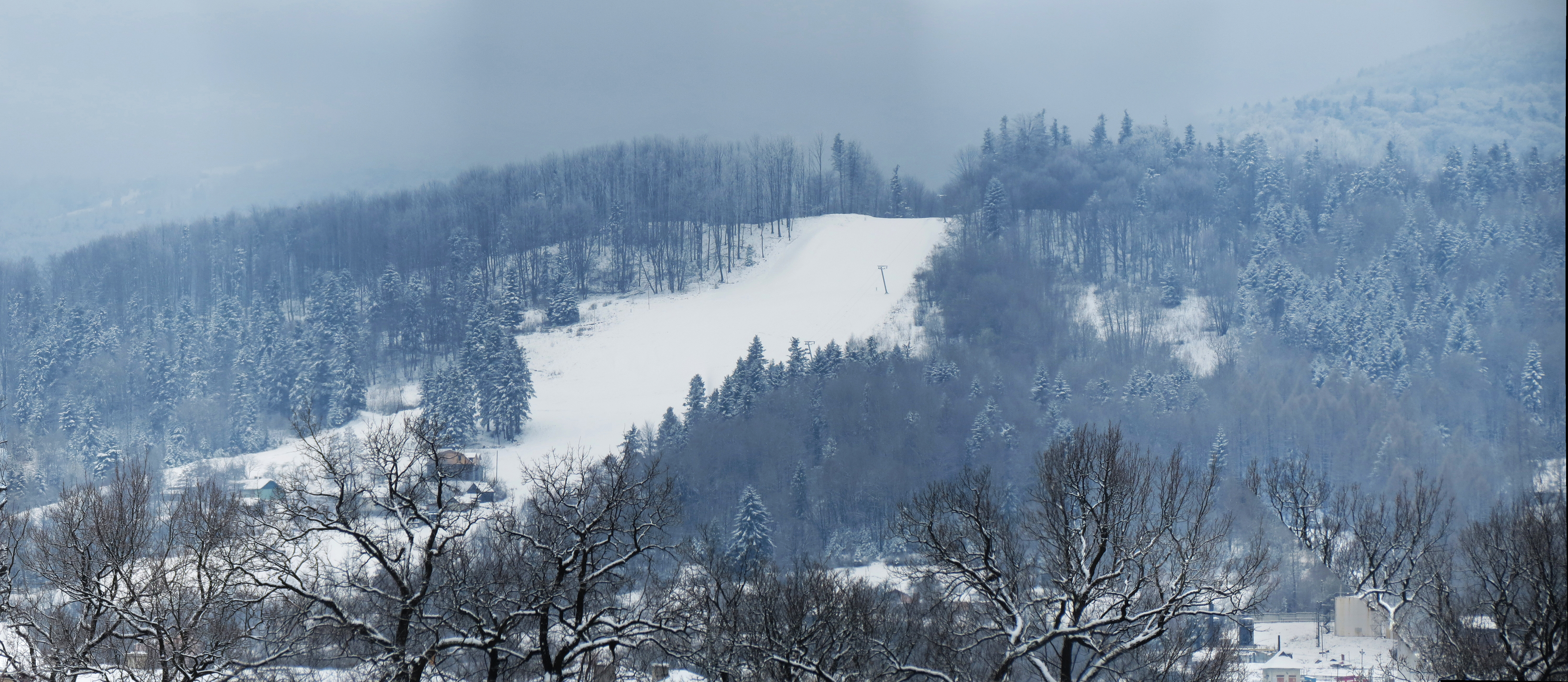
