= Kyrylo Seletskyi =

Ukrainian Greek Catholic priest (1835–1918)

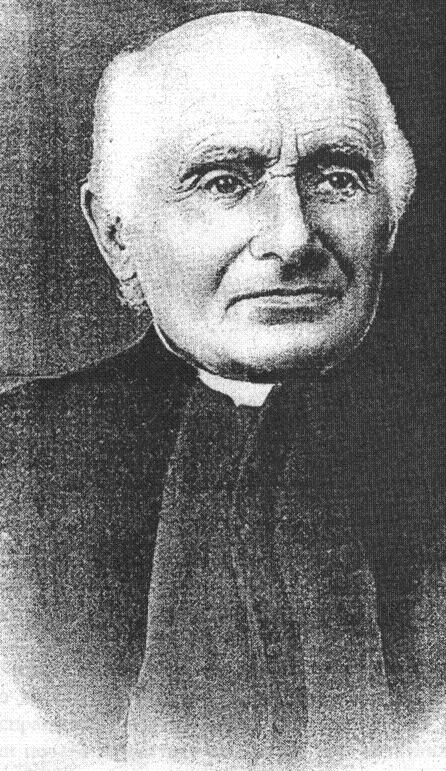
- Church: Greek Catholic

Orders
- Ordination: 8 January 1860

Personal details
- Born: 29 April 1835 Podbuż, Galicia, Austrian Empire, now Pidbuzh, Drohobych Raion, Lviv Oblast, Ukraine
- Died: 28 April 1918 (aged 82) Zhuzhel, now Zhuzheliany, Lviv Oblast, Ukraine
- Denomination: Greek Catholic
- Parents: Mykhailo Seletskyi; Ivanna Seletska
- Spouse: Emiliia, daughter of Mykolai Ivasivka
- Children: two daughters
- Occupation: Priest
- Education: • General Seminary in Lwów • Lviv University

Kyrylo Seletskyi (Ukrainian: Кирило Селецький; Polish: Cyril Sielecki; 29 April 1835 – 28 April 1918) was a Ukrainian priest of the Greek Catholic Diocese of Przemyśl, and an educational and social activist. He was the founder of the religious congregations of the Sisters Servants of Mary Immaculate, as well as the Sisters of Saint Joseph. He was recognized as a servant of God.

== Biography ==
He was born in Podbuż, in east Galicia, Austrian Empire, now Pidbuzh, Drohobych Raion, Lviv Oblast, Ukraine. He came from the aristocratic Seletskyi (pol. Sieleccy) family. His father, Mykhailo, was a teacher, and his mother, Ivanna, took care of the children.

Starting in 1843, the family lived in Sambor (now Sambir), where Kyrylo graduated from elementary school and middle school and completed high school. He then joined the General Seminary in Lviv and thus began to study theology at Lviv University. After three years of residence in Lviv he then continued at the seminary in Przemyśl.

After graduating from the seminary, he married Emiliia, daughter of Mykolai Ivasivka, a Greek Catholic priest. After six years of marriage, she died, leaving her husband with two daughters. One died shortly after a serious illness, and the younger one grew up in the care of the Basilian sisters in Yavoriv.

On 8 January 1860, he was ordained to the priesthood under the ministry of the bishop of Przemyśl, Hryhorii Yakhymovych (pol. Grzegorz Jachimowicz). For 14 years, he worked at the parish and lived very modestly. He was vicar and administrator for the communities of Stara Sil, Bacina, Milków, Lubaczów and Yavoriv.

In 1874, he became pastor of the villages Zhuzhel (now Zhuzheliany, pol. Żużel) and Tsebliv (pol. Ceblów). In both parishes, he devoted his life to the improvement of the social conditions. He was also in contact with blessed Josaphata Hordashevska.

As pastor, he began his activities with the renewal of religious life entrusted to his parishioners. He completed the construction of the church in Żużel, and improved on the church in Tsebliv. His activities were recognized by Bishop Konstantyn de Chekhovych during a canonical visitation of the parish in Zhuzhel and Tsebliv in 1905.

He was actively involved in the campaign against the scourge of alcoholism in the countryside, a concern of both the Roman and Greek Catholic churches. In cooperation with the local intelligence he organized sobriety help groups. He also tried to raise the local level of education. To improve the financial situation of the parish, he founded a society whose members committed themselves to helping widows, orphans and forgotten people in the parish. He also founded what is considered one of the first orphanages in Galicia.

In his social activities he also worked closely with the local Polish nobility. He was particularly strongly associated with Count Stanisław Antoni Potocki, whom he met as a priest in Milków. Potocki had a farm in Oleszyce and together with Seletskyi tried to eliminate illiteracy and alcoholism in the region. In her memoirs, Countess Anna Potocka called him a friend of the family.

In 1892, he co-founded the religious congregations of the Sisters Servants of Mary Immaculate. In 1894 he co-founded the Sisters of Saint Joseph to promote good deeds. The last 10 years of his life were devoted to the new congregation of the Sisters of St. Joseph.

In honour of his various religious and social activities, he was awarded the title of Papal chamberlain, which was one of the highest honours that could be bestowed by the Pope, and was often given to members of noble families. For distinguished services he was made a knight of the Austrian Order of Franz Joseph in 1910.

He died, age 82, at Zhuzhel and was officially declared a servant of God.

== Publications ==
His books include;

- My Own House (1868)
- Catechesis for Children of the Greek-Catholic Rite

== See also ==
- List of Servants of God
