= Korytyshche, Lviv Oblast =

Korytyshche Коритище
- Village
- Location within Lviv Oblast
- Coordinates: 49°12′53″N 23°12′34″E
- Country: Ukraine
- Oblast: Lviv Oblast
- Raion: Drohobych Raion
- Hromada: Skhidnytsia settlement hromada
- Area: 0.7 km^{2} (0.27 sq mi)
- Population (2001): ▼171
  - Density: 244/km^{2} (630/sq mi)

Korytyshche (Ukrainian: Коритище; Polish: Korytyszcze) is a village (selo) in Drohobych Raion, Lviv Oblast, in south-west Ukraine. It belongs to Skhidnytsia settlement hromada, one of the hromadas of Ukraine.

In the late 19th century Korytyshche were only a group of houses in the village of Staryi Kropyvnyk. There is now an Orthodox church built in 2003.

Until 18 July 2020, Korytyshche belonged to Turka Raion. The raion was abolished in July 2020 as part of the administrative reform of Ukraine, which reduced the number of raions of Lviv Oblast to seven. The area of Turka Raion was merged into Sambir Raion, however, Korytyshche was transferred to Drohobych Raion.
