= Kryntiata =

Kryntiata Кринтята
- Village
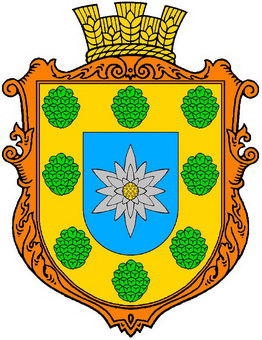
- Kryntyata's coat of arms

- Location within Lviv Oblast
- Coordinates: 49°09′00″N 23°15′08″E
- Country: Ukraine
- Oblast: Lviv
- Raion: Drohobych
- Area: 1.2 km^{2} (0.46 sq mi)
- Population: 127
  - Density: 110/km^{2} (270/sq mi)

Kryntiata (Ukrainian: Кринтята, Polish: Kręciata) is a village (selo) in Drohobych Raion, Lviv Oblast, in south-west Ukraine. It belongs to Skhidnytsia settlement hromada, one of the hromadas of Ukraine.

Kryntiata used to be a hamlet of Holovske. In the interwar period the village belonged to Poland and a small oil mine operated here.

Until 18 July 2020, Kryntiata belonged to Turka Raion. The raion was abolished in July 2020 as part of the administrative reform of Ukraine, which reduced the number of raions of Lviv Oblast to seven. The area of Turka Raion was merged into Sambir Raion, however, Kryntiata was transferred to Drohobych Raion.
