= Staryi Kropyvnyk =

Village in Lviv Oblast, Ukraine

Coordinates: 49°14′00″N 23°15′56″E

Staryi Kropyvnyk Старий Кропивник
- Village
- Location within Lviv Oblast Location within Ukraine
- Country: Ukraine
- Oblast: Lviv Oblast
- Raion: Drohobych Raion
- Hromada: Skhidnytsia settlement hromada
- First mentioned: 1250
- Elevation: 522 m (1,713 ft)

Population (2023)
  - Total: 955

Staryi Kropyvnyk (Ukrainian: Старий Кропивник) is a village in Skhidnytsia settlement hromada, Drohobych Raion, Lviv Oblast, Ukraine. It is located in the foothills of the Carpathian Mountains in the historic region of Galicia.

== Geography ==
The village lies in a mountainous valley between the ridges of Knyaziv Dil (833 m) and Bukovets (804 m). A local stream flows through the settlement and drains into the Stryi River.

Staryi Kropyvnyk stretches for approximately 4 km along the valley floor.

== History ==
The first recorded mention of the village dates to around 1250. Historically, the settlement developed as part of the rural communities of the Carpathian highlands.

== Etymology ==
According to local tradition, the name “Kropyvnyk” derives from the Ukrainian word kropyva (кропива), meaning “nettle.” After a historical raid traditionally attributed to the Tatars, the abandoned site reportedly became overgrown with nettles, giving rise to the name. The prefix “Staryi” (Old) distinguishes it from a nearby settlement known as Novyi Kropyvnyk.

== Architecture ==
The wooden Church of the Translation of the Relics of Saint Nicholas was built in 1715 on a hillside in the center of the village. Local tradition holds that the site was chosen after oxen transporting materials for a new church stopped at the hill and refused to move further. The church was damaged by fire in 2003 and later restored.

On 12 October 2014 a monument to Taras Shevchenko was ceremonially unveiled in the village.

== Economy ==
Due to its proximity to spa and resort settlements such as Skhidnytsia and Truskavets, the village participates in regional tourism and rural green tourism initiatives.
