= Smilna =

Village in Lviv Oblast, Ukraine

Coordinates: 49°17′01″N 23°13′25″E

Smilna Смільна
- Village
- Location of Smilna in Lviv Oblast Smilna (Ukraine)
- Country: Ukraine
- Oblast: Lviv Oblast
- Raion: Drohobych Raion
- Hromada: Drohobych urban hromada

Population (2001)
  - Total: 375
- Time zone: UTC+2 (EET)
  - Summer (DST): UTC+3 (EEST)
- Postal code: 82190

Smilna (Ukrainian: Смільна) is a village in Drohobych Raion of Lviv Oblast, western Ukraine. The village is part of the Skhidnytsia settlement hromada, one of the hromadas of Ukraine.

== Geography ==
Smilna is located in the foothills of the Carpathian Mountains within Lviv Oblast, southwest of the city of Drohobych. The village lies near the Opalyna River, a tributary of the Bystrytsia-Hirska River, and is surrounded by forested and agricultural landscapes.

== Population ==
According to the 2001 Ukrainian census, Smilna had a population of 375 residents. More recent geographic estimates place the population at approximately 400–411 people.

== History ==
Smilna is documented as a historical rural settlement of the Galicia region. In earlier centuries, its inhabitants were engaged primarily in agriculture, animal husbandry, and hunting. During the 17th–19th centuries, iron smelting activities operated in the vicinity of the village.

In the mid-20th century, Smilna served as the center of a rural council and was part of the “Prykarpattia” state farm, which specialized in meat and dairy production. At that time, the village contained an eight-year school, a cultural club, and a library.

== Administrative status ==
As a result of the 2020 administrative reform of Ukraine, Smilna became part of Drohobych Raion and was incorporated into the Skhidnytsia settlement hromada.

== Culture ==
The village preserves traditional Ukrainian rural culture, including folk customs and religious celebrations. The population is predominantly ethnic Ukrainian.
