= Jeremiah Lomnytskyj =

Ukrainian priest and missionary (1860–1916)

The Servant of God, the Rev. Jeremiah Lomnytskyj, O.S.B.M.
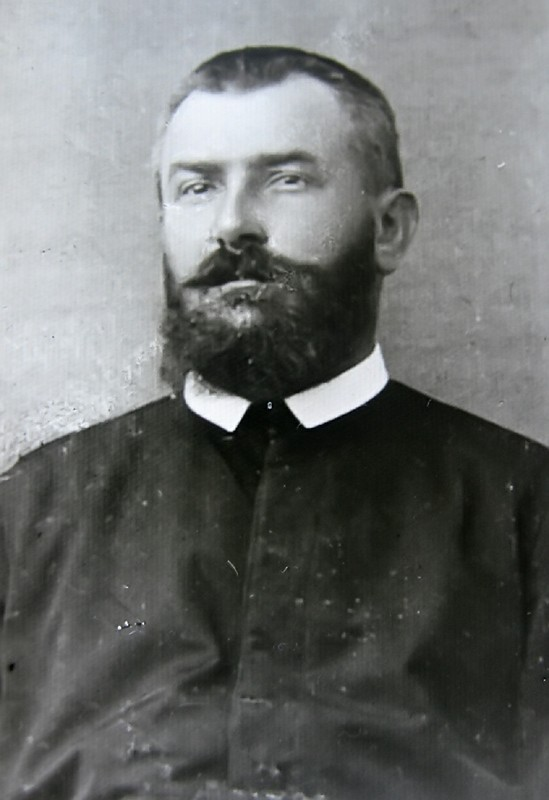

Religious, priest & missionary
- Born: John; February 8, 1860; Kavske, Kingdom of Galicia and Lodomeria, Austrian Empire
- Died: 3 July 1916 (aged 56); Simbirsk, now Ulyanovsk

Jeremiah Lomnytskyj, O.S.B.M. (Ukrainian: Єремія Іван Ломницький; February 8, 1860–July 3, 1916) was a Ukrainian Basilian priest, missionary and an educational and church activist. He and Josaphata Hordashevska founded the religious congregation of the Sisters Servants of Mary Immaculate. Lomnytskyj is recognized as a servant of God.

== Biography ==
Jeremiah Lomnytskyj, O.S.B.M., was born on February 8, 1860, in Kavske, in the deanery of Drohobych, Austrian Empire (now Stryi Raion, Lviv Oblast in western Ukraine). On February 12, he was baptized, and given the name John. He studied at the Lviv Academy and the Franz Joseph Gymnasium (High School) in Drohobych, then at the Teachers' College in Lviv, after which he taught in a six-grade public school in Kozari, now in Ivano-Frankivsk Raion.

On September 28, 1882, he entered the Basilian novitiate in Dobromyl, and took the religious name, Jeremiah. On May 17, 1884, he pronounced his first vows, and began to study philosophy and theology under the direction of the Jesuits. On January 17, 1886, he was ordained to the priesthood, and on May 22, 1887, pronounced his final vows in Dobromyl.

In 1889, he and several other priests organized the first public mission in Galicia, in the city of Horodok. After more studies in moral theology, and teaching in the Basilian scholasticate in Dobromyl, he began a mission ministry in Galicia, directing a total of 51 public missions beginning in 1891.

From May 16–21, 1891, he headed the mission team at Zhuzhel, in the eparchy of Przemysl. During the mission, three girls approached him with the plea to help them enter a monastery. This event was the first step towards the founding of the Congregation of the Sisters Servants of Mary Immaculate.

After teaching for several years in various centers, he was sent to be spiritual director for the newly opened novitiate of the Sisters Servants in Krystynopil, in September, 1894. He also taught moral theology to the Basilian clerics. Amid various other appointments over the years, in 1898, Metropolitan Sylvester Sembratovych appointed him commissary of the Congregation of the SSMI, thus making him the spiritual and administrative superior of that institute. By 1902 the Congregation numbered 128 Sisters, in 26 convents across the country. They were able to hold their first General Chapter in August of that year, at which Hordashevska was elected the first Superior General of the Congregation and Lomnytsky stepped down from his post of commissary of the SSMI, and was replaced by Father Platonid Filas, OSBM.

In the 1904-1908 period, he made two trips to Russia with the aim of drawing the attention of the Russian government and the public to the plight of the Ukrainian Greek Catholic Church in Kholm and Podlachia, and at the same time, with directions from Metropolitan Andrey Sheptytsky, to help the Russian Greek Catholic Church in Russia. At that time, there were rumours about appointing Lomnytskyj bishop of that church.

From 1907 to 1915, he was rector of the major seminary in Stanislaviv. He taught pastoral theology, rhetoric, methodology, catechetics and homiletics. On January 24, 1915, he was arrested by the Russian occupation army, and on February 5, exiled to Symbirsk. He died in exile on July 3, 1916, of rheumatism and respiratory complications.

== The Cause of Beatification ==
On April 5, 2009, in the cathedral of the Resurrection in Ivano-Frankivsk, the Cause of Beatification of the Servant of God, Jeremiah Lomnytskyj, OSBM, co-founder of the Congregation of the Sisters Servants of Mary Immaculate, was officially opened.
