= Skhidnytsia settlement hromada =

Settlement hromada in Lviv Oblast, Ukraine

Skhidnytsia settlement hromada Східницька селищна громада
- Hromada
- Location within Lviv Oblast Location within Ukraine
- Coordinates: 49°13′25″N 23°21′11″E
- Country: Ukraine
- Oblast (province): Lviv Oblast
- Raion (district): Drohobych Raion

Area
  - Total: 414.3 km^{2} (160.0 sq mi)

Population (2023)
  - Total: 19,951
- Website: skhidnytsia-rada.gov.ua

Skhidnytsia settlement territorial hromada (Ukrainian: Східницька селищна територіальна громада, romanized: Skhidnytska selyshchna terytorialna hromada) is one of the hromadas of Ukraine, located in Drohobych Raion within the country's western Lviv Oblast. Its administrative centre is the urban-type settlement of Skhidnytsia.

The hromada has an area of 414.3 km^{2} (160.0 mi^{2}), as well as a population of 19,951 (as of 2023).

== Composition ==
In addition to two urban-type settlements (Skhidnytsia and Pidbuzh), the hromada includes 20 villages:

- Bystrytsia-Hirska
- Dovhe
- Holovske
- Huta
- Korytyshche
- Kryntiata
- Lastivka
- Maidan
- Novyi Kropyvnyk
- Opaka
- Pereprostynia
- Pidsukhe
- Rybnyk
- Smilna
- Staryi Kropyvnyk
- Storona
- Svydnyk
- Zalokot
- Zhdanivka
- Zubrytsia
