= Lastivka =

Lastivka Ластівка
- Village
- Location within Lviv Oblast
- Coordinates: 49°13′32″N 23°11′21″E
- Country: Ukraine
- Oblast: Lviv
- Raion: Drohobych
- Area: 1 km^{2} (0.39 sq mi)
- Population: 802
  - Density: 800/km^{2} (2,100/sq mi)

Lastivka (Ukrainian: Ластівка, Polish: Łastówek or Łastówki) is a village (selo) in Drohobych Raion, Lviv Oblast, in south-west Ukraine. It belongs to Skhidnytsia settlement hromada, one of the hromadas of Ukraine.

The village was first mentioned in 1528.

Until 18 July 2020, Lastivka belonged to Turka Raion. The raion was abolished in July 2020 as part of the administrative reform of Ukraine, which reduced the number of raions of Lviv Oblast to seven. The area of Turka Raion was merged into Sambir Raion, however, Lastivka was transferred to Drohobych Raion.
