= Zubrytsia =

Zubrytsia Зубриця
- Village
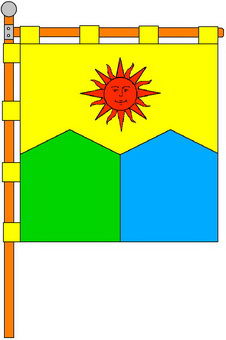
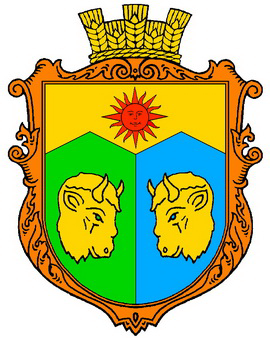
- Flag Coat of arms

- Location within Lviv Oblast
- Coordinates: 49°06′10″N 23°12′11″E
- Country: Ukraine
- Oblast: Lviv
- Raion: Drohobych
- Area: 1.5 km^{2} (0.58 sq mi)
- Population: 157
  - Density: 100/km^{2} (270/sq mi)

Zubrytsia (Ukrainian: Зубриця, Polish: Zubrzyca) is a village (selo) in Drohobych Raion, Lviv Oblast, in south-west Ukraine. It belongs to Skhidnytsia settlement hromada, one of the hromadas of Ukraine.

The village began as a hamlet of Holovske and became independent in the late 19th century. The village boasts an Orthodox church built in 1871.

Until 18 July 2020, Zubrytsia belonged to Turka Raion. The raion was abolished in July 2020 as part of the administrative reform of Ukraine, which reduced the number of raions of Lviv Oblast to seven. The area of Turka Raion was merged into Sambir Raion, however, Zubrytsia was transferred to Drohobych Raion.
