= Josaphata Hordashevska =

Ukrainian nun

Blessed Josaphata Hordashevska S.S.M.I.
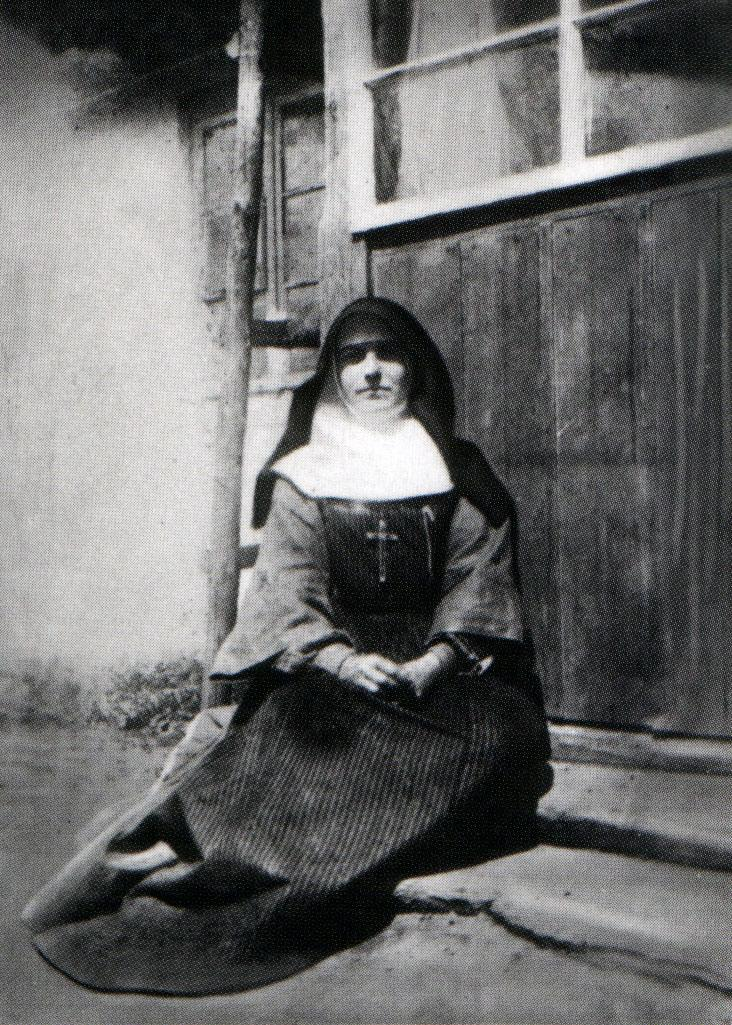

Religious Sister, Foundress
- Born: 20 November 1869; Lviv, Austro-Hungarian Empire
- Died: 7 April 1919 (aged 49); Lviv, Second Polish Republic
- Venerated in: Catholic Church Ukrainian Catholic Church
- Beatified: 27 June 2001, Lviv, Ukraine by John Paul II
- Major shrine: General Motherhouse of the Sisters Servants of Mary Immaculate, Rome, Italy
- Feast: 20 November

Josaphata (née Michaelina Hordashevska; Ukrainian: Михайлина Гордашевська; 20 November 1869 – 7 April 1919) was a Ukrainian Greek Catholic religious sister in the Austro-Hungarian Empire. She was the first member and co-founder of the Sisters Servants of Mary Immaculate.

== Biography ==
Michaelina Hordashevska was born on 20 November 1869 in Lviv, then part of the Austro-Hungarian Empire and now Ukraine, into a family who were members of the Ukrainian Catholic Church. At 18, she considered consecrating her life to God in a contemplative monastery of the Basilian nuns, then the only Eastern-rite women's religious congregation. She attended a spiritual retreat preached by a Basilian monk, Jeremiah Lomnytskyj, whose spiritual guidance she sought. Hordashevska took a private vow of chastity for one year with his permission. She was to renew this vow twice.

At that time, Lomnytsky, seeing that there was a need for active religious sisters to meet the social needs of the poor and needy faithful of the church, had decided to establish a women's congregation which would follow an active life of service. He did so with Cyril Sielecki, pastor of the village of Zhuzhelyany. Lomnytsky felt that Hordashevska would be an appropriate candidate to found such a congregation. Thus, she was asked to be the foundress of such a group, rather than follow the monastic life she had been considering. When she agreed, she was sent in June 1892 to the Polish Roman Catholic Felician Sisters to experience the life of community, which followed an active consecrated life.

Hordashevska returned to Lviv two months later and, on 24 August 1892, took the religious habit of the new congregation and received the name Josaphata, in honor of the Ukrainian Catholic martyr Josaphat Kuntsevych. She then went to Zhuzhelyany, becoming the first Superior of the seven young women recruited for the new institute, training them in the spirit and charism of the Sisters Servants: "Serve your people where the need is greatest."

Hordashevska led the new congregation through its growth and development for the rest of her life. She oversaw the development of the various new ministries the Sisters entered. For this, she had to steer a new path for the sisters in the Eastern Church, sometimes caught between Lomnytsky and Sielecki's conflicting visions.

By 1902, the congregation numbered 128 sisters in 26 convents across the country. They held their first General Chapter in August of that year, at which Hordashevska was elected the first superior general of the congregation and Lomnytsky resigned from that office. Soon, however, internal divisions led Hordashevska to tender her resignation to the Metropolitan Archbishop of Lviv, Andrey Sheptytsky. Under the new superior general appointed by the Metropolitan Archbishop, Hordashevska and her natural sister, Arsenia Hordashevska, were denied permission to take permanent vows.

Due to her canonical status of still being in temporary vows, Hordashevska was ineligible to participate in the next General Chapter of the congregation. Nonetheless, she was elected vicar general of the congregation in absentia, with the chapter delegates petitioning the metropolitan that she be allowed to make her permanent vows. This request was granted, and Hordashevska did so the following day, 11 May 1909, and assumed the office to which she had been voted.

Three years later, Hordashevska was diagnosed with tuberculosis of the bone. In 1919, at the age of 49 and on the day she had predicted, she died amidst terrible suffering.

== Influence ==
According to the testimony of Philomena Yuskiv, "She [Josaphata Hordashevska] showed her love for her people through her heartfelt desire to lift them morally and spiritually; she taught children, youth and women, served the sick, visited the poor and needy, taught liturgical chant and looked after the Church's beauty." Numerous miracles are ascribed to her intercession after her death.

Her religious order, the Sisters Servants of Mary Immaculate, was the largest female religious community in the Ukrainian Greek Catholic Church.

== Relics ==
In November 1982, Hordashevska's remains were exhumed and taken to Rome, where they are kept in a reliquary in the general motherhouse of the Congregation of the Sisters Servants of Mary Immaculate in Rome. Small parts of the relics remain in various places around Ukraine, including a monastery in Lviv, located on Pasichna Street.

== Beatification ==
On 27 June 2001, she was proclaimed Blessed by Pope John Paul II in Lviv, in a beatification ceremony during the Holy Liturgy in the Byzantine rite.

== See also ==
- Byzantine Discalced Carmelites
