= Holovske =

Holovske Головське
- Village
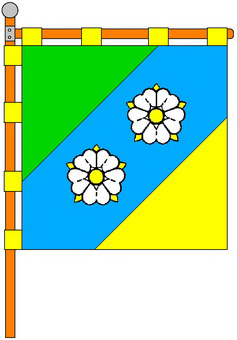
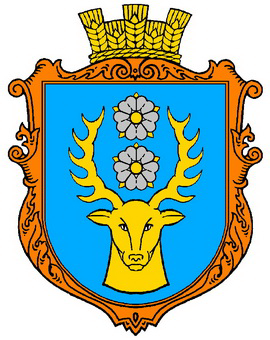
- Flag Coat of arms

- Location within Lviv Oblast
- Coordinates: 49°08′44″N 23°13′41″E
- Country: Ukraine
- Oblast: Lviv
- Raion: Drohobych
- Area: 3.8 km^{2} (1.5 sq mi)
- Population: 216
  - Density: 57/km^{2} (150/sq mi)

Holovske (Ukrainian: Головське, Polish: Hołowsko) is a village (selo) in Drohobych Raion, Lviv Oblast, in south-west Ukraine. It belongs to Skhidnytsia settlement hromada, one of the hromadas of Ukraine.

The village of Zubrytsia began as a hamlet of Holovske, but became independent in the late 19th century.

Until 18 July 2020, Holovske belonged to Turka Raion. The raion was abolished in July 2020 as part of the administrative reform of Ukraine, which reduced the number of raions of Lviv Oblast to seven. The area of Turka Raion was merged into Sambir Raion, however, Holovske was transferred to Drohobych Raion.
