= Novyi Kropyvnyk =

Village in Lviv Oblast, Ukraine

Coordinates: 49°12′51″N 23°18′22″E

Novyi Kropyvnyk Новий Кропивник
- Village
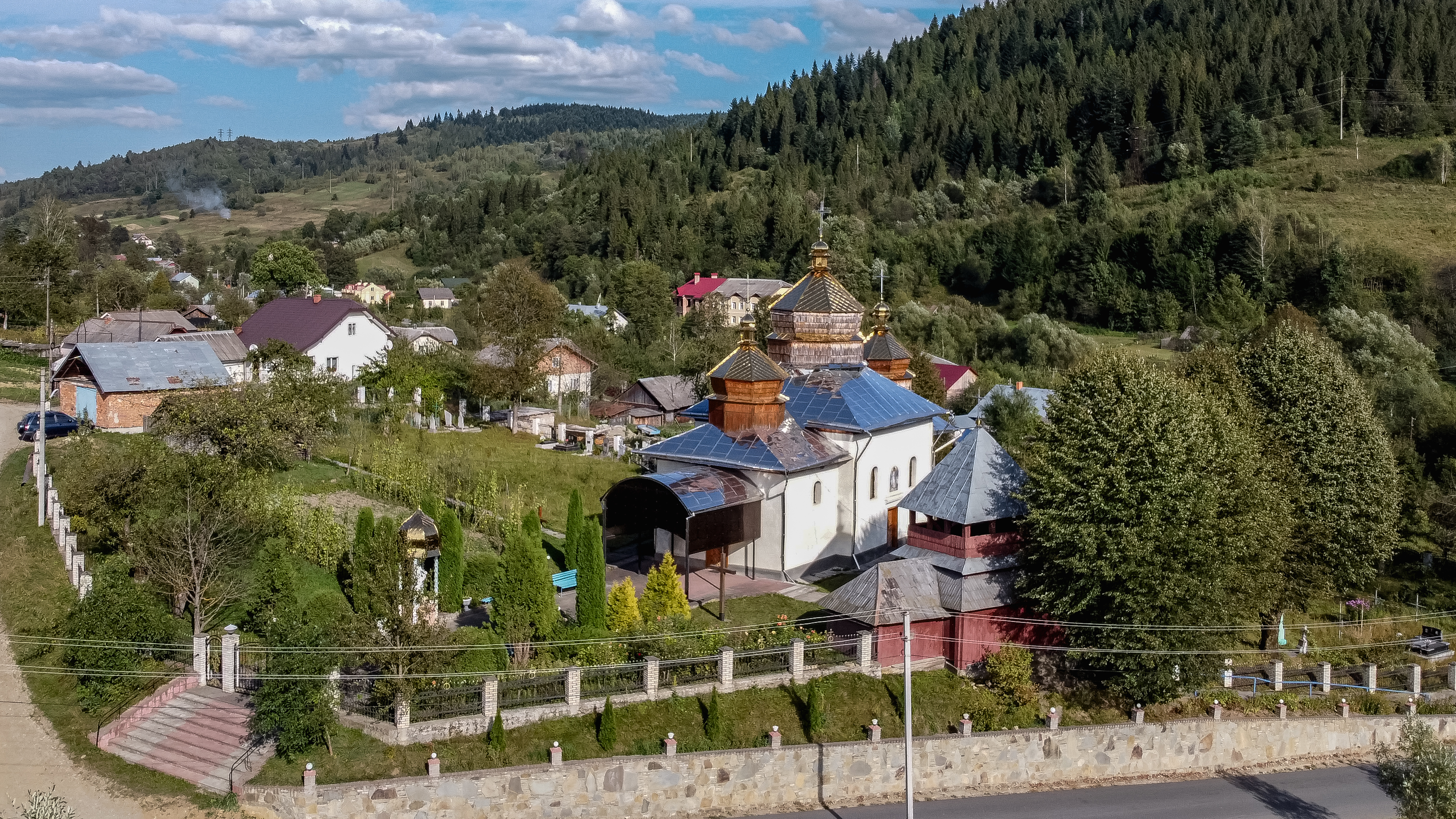

- Location within Lviv Oblast Location within Ukraine
- Country: Ukraine
- Oblast: Lviv Oblast
- Raion: Drohobych Raion
- Hromada: Skhidnytsia settlement hromada
- Elevation: 493 m (1,617 ft)

Population (2001 census)
  - Total: 1,175
- Postal code: 82194

Novyi Kropyvnyk (Ukrainian: Новий Кропивник) is a village (selo) in Drohobych Raion, Lviv Oblast, in western Ukraine. It is part of the local Skhidnytsia settlement hromada, one of the hromadas of Ukraine. The village lies near the foothills of the Carpathian Mountains and is located close to other rural settlements such as Staryi Kropyvnyk and Rybnyk. Novyi Kropyvnyk had a population of 1,175 according to the 2001 Ukrainian census.

== Geography ==
Novyi Kropyvnyk is situated in western Ukraine’s Lviv Oblast, within Drohobych Raion. The village is located near the Stryi River and stands in the general vicinity of other small settlements such as Staryi Kropyvnyk and Rybnyk.

It lies within the Skhidnytsia settlement hromada, one of the territorial hromadas of Drohobych Raion created as part of Ukraine’s decentralization reform.

== History ==
The area around Novyi Kropyvnyk has a historical record going back many centuries, with settlements in this part of Galicia documented as early as the 14th century. The modern village developed around agrarian and rural community life typical of the Carpathian foothills region.

== Demographics ==
According to the 2001 Ukrainian census, the population of Novyi Kropyvnyk was recorded as 1,175 inhabitants. The broader rural council area historically included nearby hamlets and settlements such as Huta, Pereprostynia, and Pidsukhe.

== Infrastructure ==
The village has its own post office operating under the Ukrainian postal system with postal code 82194. Local streets within the settlement include Dovbusha, Zarichna, Nabrizhna, Nova, and Stryiska, among others.
