= Pidbuzh =

Rural locality in Lviv Oblast, Ukraine

Pidbuzh Підбуж
- Rural settlement
- Location in Lviv Oblast Location in Ukraine
- Coordinates: 49°20′04″N 23°14′51″E
- Country: Ukraine
- Oblast: Lviv Oblast
- Raion: Drohobych Raion
- Hromada: Skhidnytsia settlement hromada

Population (2022)
  - Total: 3,346
- Time zone: UTC+2 (EET)
  - Summer (DST): UTC+3 (EEST)

Pidbuzh (Ukrainian: Підбуж) is a rural settlement in Drohobych Raion of Lviv Oblast in Ukraine. It is located in the Carpathian Mountains, at the banks of the Bystrytsia Pysmenytska, a right tributary of the Dniester. It belongs to Skhidnytsia settlement hromada, one of the hromadas of Ukraine. Population: 3,346 (2022 estimate)

Until 26 January 2024, Pidbuzh was designated urban-type settlement. On this day, a new law entered into force which abolished this status, and Pidbuzh became a rural settlement.

== Economy ==
=== Transportation ===
The settlement is connected by roads with Drohobych, as well as with Sambir where there is access to Highway H13 connecting Lviv with Uzhhorod.

The closest railway stations are also in Drohobych and Sambir.
