= Sisters Servants of Mary Immaculate =

- Abbreviation: S.S.M.I
- Formation: 1892; 134 years ago
- Founder: Blessed Josaphata Hordashevska
- Type: Catholic religious order
- Superior General: Sister Sofia Lebedowicz, SSMI
- Website: ssmi.org

The Sisters Servants of Mary Immaculate (S.S.M.I.) are a religious congregation of women in the Ukrainian Greek-Catholic Church. They were founded in 1845 in Lviv, then part of the Austro-Hungarian Empire and now in Ukraine, the first such organization of religious women in this Eastern Catholic Church. The founders were the Blessed Josaphata Hordashevska and the Servant of God, Father Jeremiah Lomnytskyj, O.S.B.M.

They are a different religious institute than the Congregation of Sisters Servants of Mary Immaculate founded by Honorat Koźmiński.

== Roots ==
The Ukrainian Catholic Church was formed in 1595 through the Union of Brest, when several bishops of the Ukrainian Orthodox Church, the King of Poland, agreed to enter into full communion with the Holy See of Rome. The adherents of this union were a minority within the general Ukrainian population, with strong hostility coming from the adherents of the Orthodox Church. Ukrainian Catholics retained the traditions of Orthodox Church institutions, one of which was an enclosed religious order as the sole approved option for women who wanted to live a religious lifestyle. They were, however, also in touch with the ecclesiastical developments of Western Europe.

Father Jeremiah Lomnytskyj, a Basilian monk, was among the first members of his religious Order trained under Polish Jesuit Fathers. From his experiences with the Polish Roman Catholics, Lomnytskyj conceived the idea of establishing communities of active Religious Sisters to assist the Basilian Fathers in answering the great social needs of the people, as had emerged throughout Western Europe during that era.

Lomnytskyj was invited in 1891 by Father Cyril Sielecki, a widowed priest, to give a mission at the parish of Zhuzhel (now called Zhuzheliany) where he was leaving as pastor. The mission was very well received, and he was approached by several young girls who wanted to give their lives to God. When he indicated that the usual dowry would be needed for admission to a monastery, one girl indicated that she was too poor for that. Lomnytskyj was troubled by this. Michaelina Hordashevska, later to be known as Mother Josaphata, had already been discerning a religious vocation. Fr. Lomnytskyj acted as her spiritual director in Lviv, and under his guidance, she made a private vow of chastity. Lomnytskyj now pondered whether she could be instrumental in realizing this goal of establishing active religious communities of women in their Church, beginning with these several young women. He then invited her to become the first member of this new way of life he was proposing, which he and Seletsky would direct, advising her that there would be much work and suffering ahead. Michaelina accepted his invitation.

== Foundation of the Congregation ==
In June 1892, Michaelina Hordashevska went to stay with the Polish Roman Catholic Felician Sisters, a fairly new congregation which had been founded with a similar goal by a Polish noblewoman. After two months, she returned to her native city of Lviv on 22 August, and fashioned the religious habit which was to distinguish the new Congregation. Two days later, she was formally given this habit and the religious name Josaphata, in honor of the revered Ukrainian Catholic martyr, Saint Josaphat.

Hordashevka then went to the nearby village of Zhuzhel (site of the parish mission where seven other young women who had been recruited for this new community were waiting to establish a community. They then began their preparation to start their lives of service. Sister Josaphata was appointed Superior of the community. She taught and encouraged the other members of the community, telling them: "Serve your people where the need is greatest".

Within ten years, the 8 Sisters had grown to 128, living in 26 convents throughout Ukraine. They were able to hold their first General Chapter in 1902, in the course of which Sister Josaphata Hordashevka was elected the first Superior General of the Congregation, with Father Jeremiah Lomnytskyj resigning his position as Director of the institute. Unfortunately, severe divisions arose within the Congregation, driving Hordashevka to submit her resignation soon afterwards to the Metropolitan Archbishop of Lviv, the Servant of God Andrey Sheptytsky, O.S.B.M., who accepted it and appointed a new Superior General.

After this, Sister Josaphata was denied permission to make permanent vows, until the next General Chapter went ahead and voted her as Vicaress General of the Congregation, despite her ineligibility for the office due to her canonical status. The delegates of the Chapter petitioned the Metropolitan to allow her to make her final vows, a petition which was granted and she assumed the post. Three years later, though, Mother Josaphata was diagnosed with tuberculosis of the bone. She died from this disease in 1919, at the age of 49.

== Growth and persecution ==
The Sisters Servants had been founded to minister to the spiritual, moral, intellectual and social needs of the Ukrainian people. As many of them emigrated to other countries over the years, in search of a better life, the Sisters branched out from western Ukraine to Canada, Yugoslavia, Brazil, the United States, Poland, Slovakia, Italy, Great Britain, France, Argentina, Germany, Australia and Kazakhstan.

After World War II, however, Ukraine was absorbed into the Soviet Union. The Communist government which took control of the region soon suppressed the Sisters and seized their properties, as well as that of all other religious institutions. The Sisters were forced to live hidden lives of dedication. The Superior General at that time, Mother Veronica Gargil, was able to flee the Soviet Union with another member of the General Council, first to Czechoslovakia, then, in 1945, to Rome. Shortly after that, the Canadian Province of the Congregation was able to purchase property, which was established as the international motherhouse of the Congregation. Mother Josaphata's remains were exhumed in 1982 and transferred to the Generalate in Rome.

With the collapse of the Soviet Union in 1991, the Sisters who had lived their consecrated lives in secret were able to re-emerge as a public association. Members of the Congregation from throughout the world joined together to give support and help to their Sisters in Ukraine.

== Present day ==
In 1992 the Congregation celebrated the centennial of its founding with Sisters Servants from thirteen countries participating in a Divine Liturgy of Thanksgiving and a special Jubilee program held in Ukraine.

On 6 April 1998, Pope John Paul II issued the decree acknowledging Mother Josaphata's heroic virtues, and the occurrence of a miracle effected through intercession to her. She was beatified on 27 June 2001, during a visit by that Pope to her native city of Lviv, along with another member of the Congregation who had been murdered by a Soviet soldier and over twenty other martyrs of the Ukrainian Catholic Church.

As of 2018, there are about 700 sisters serving in Brazil, Canada, Poland, Serbia, Slovakia, Ukraine, the United States. The headquarters are in Rome. In the United States, the sisters operate St. Joseph’s Adult Care Home in Sloatsburg, New York.

== External sources ==
- Website of the Sisters Servants of Mary Immaculate
- Saints SPQN
- The Vatican website
