= Skhidnytsia =

Rural locality in Lviv Oblast, Ukraine

Skhidnytsia Східниця
- Rural settlement
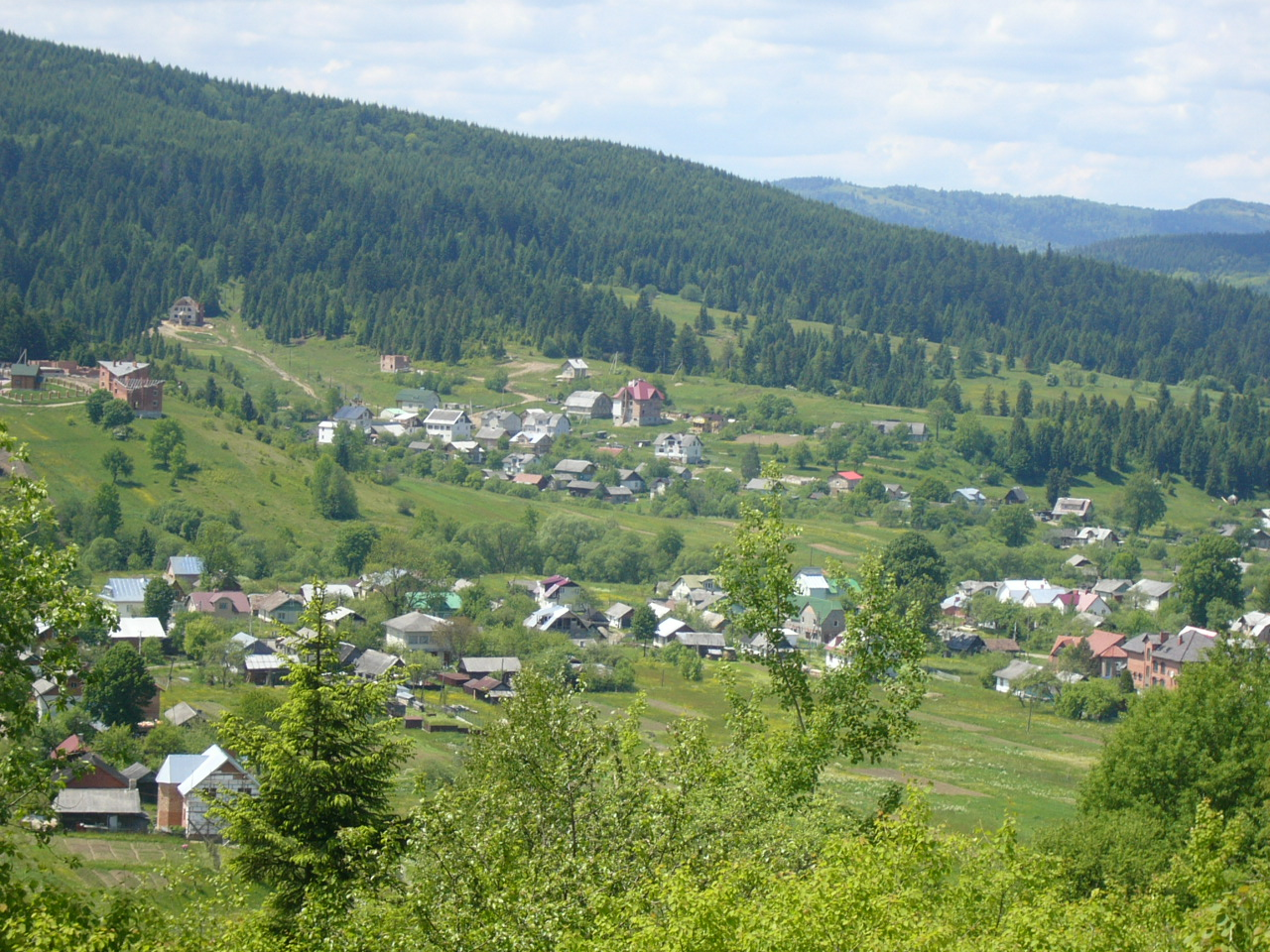
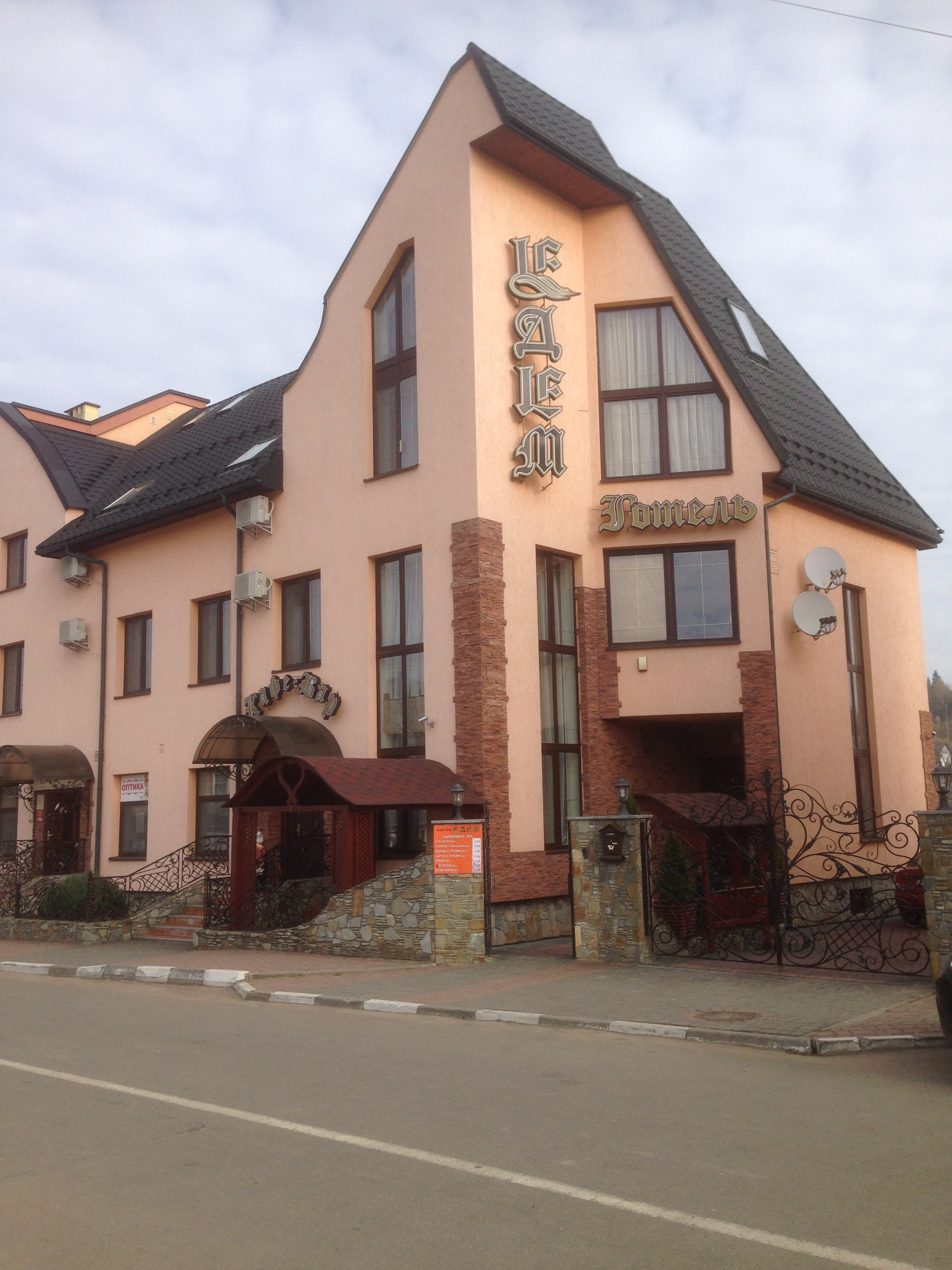
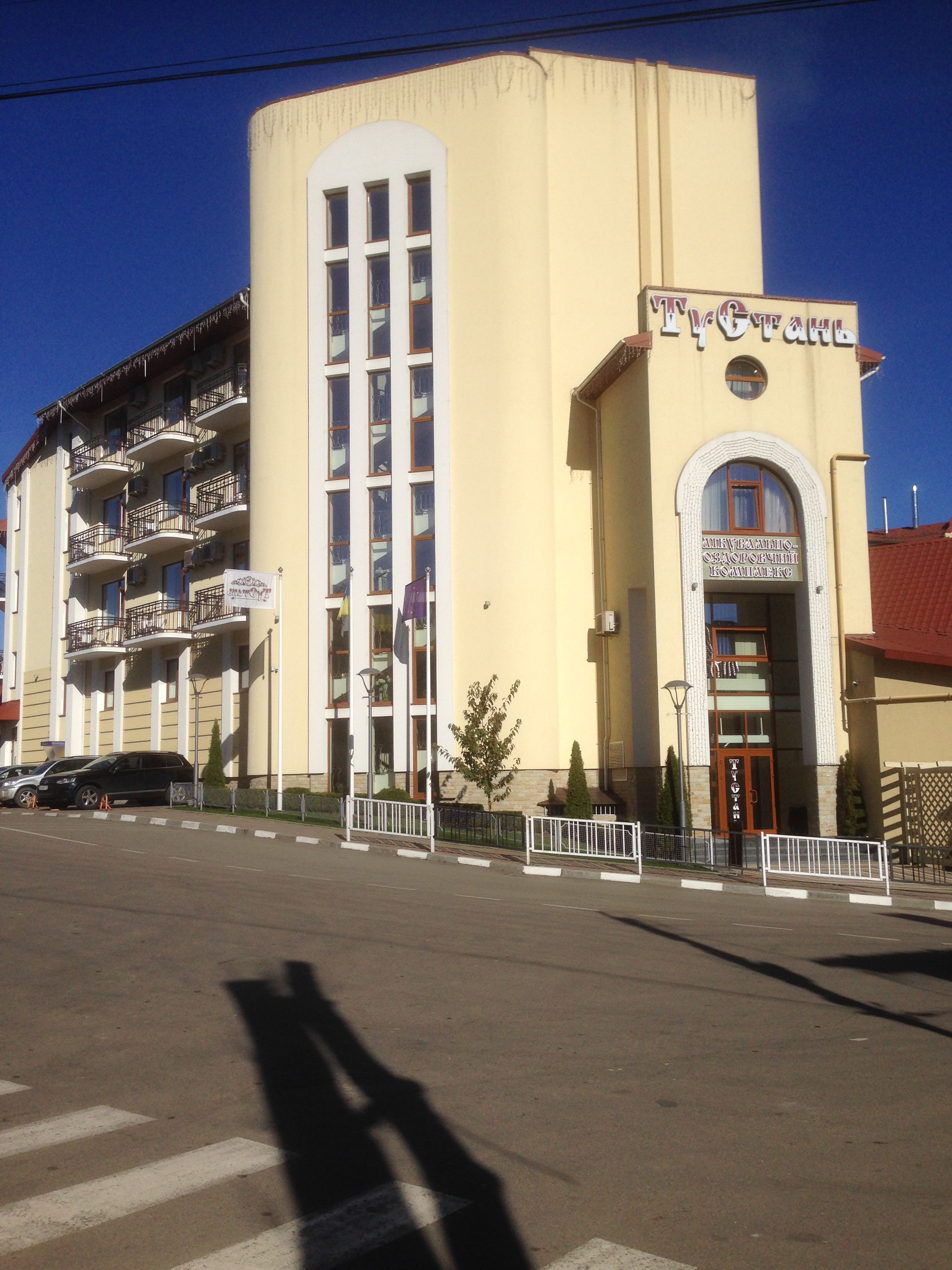
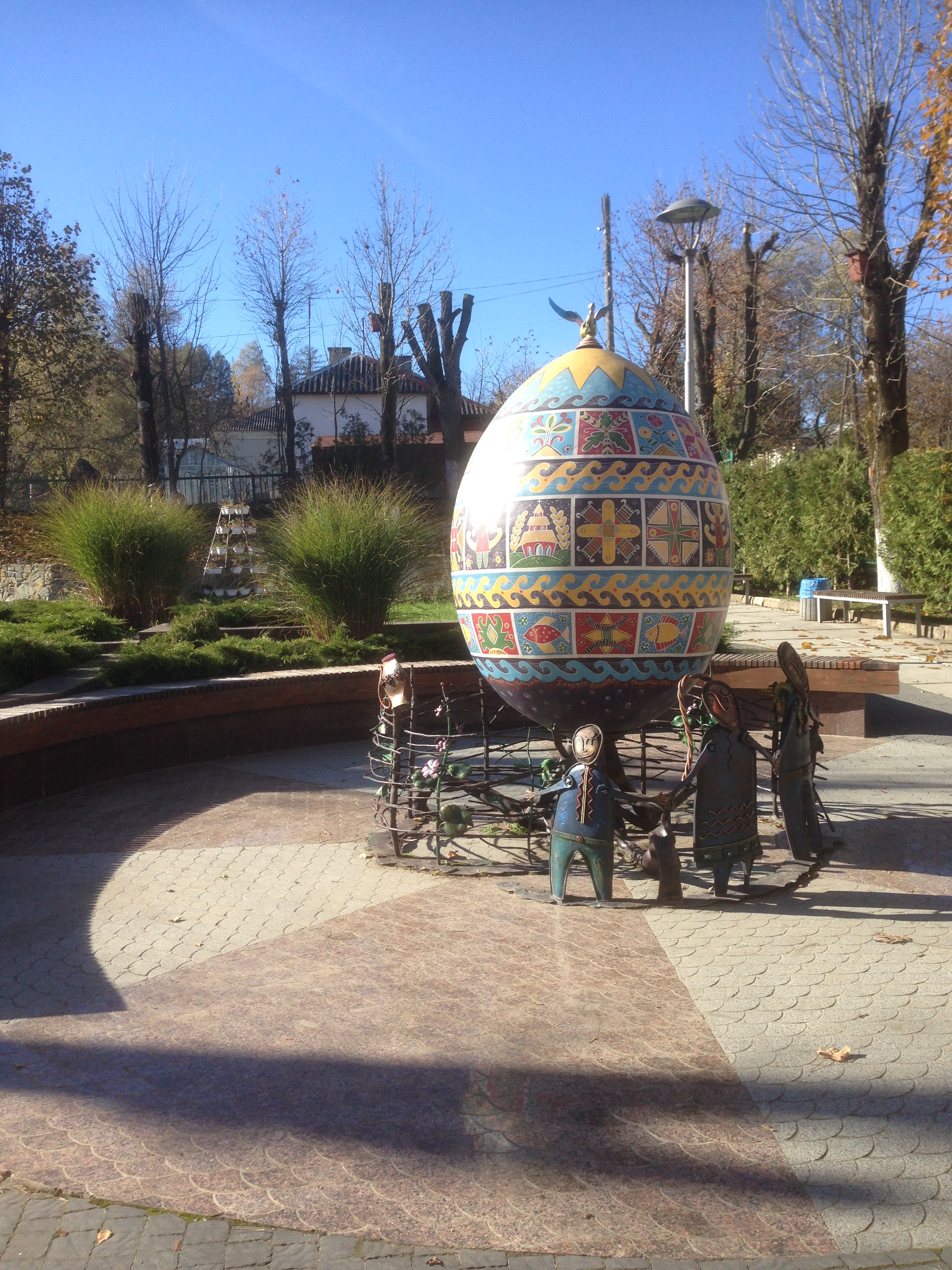
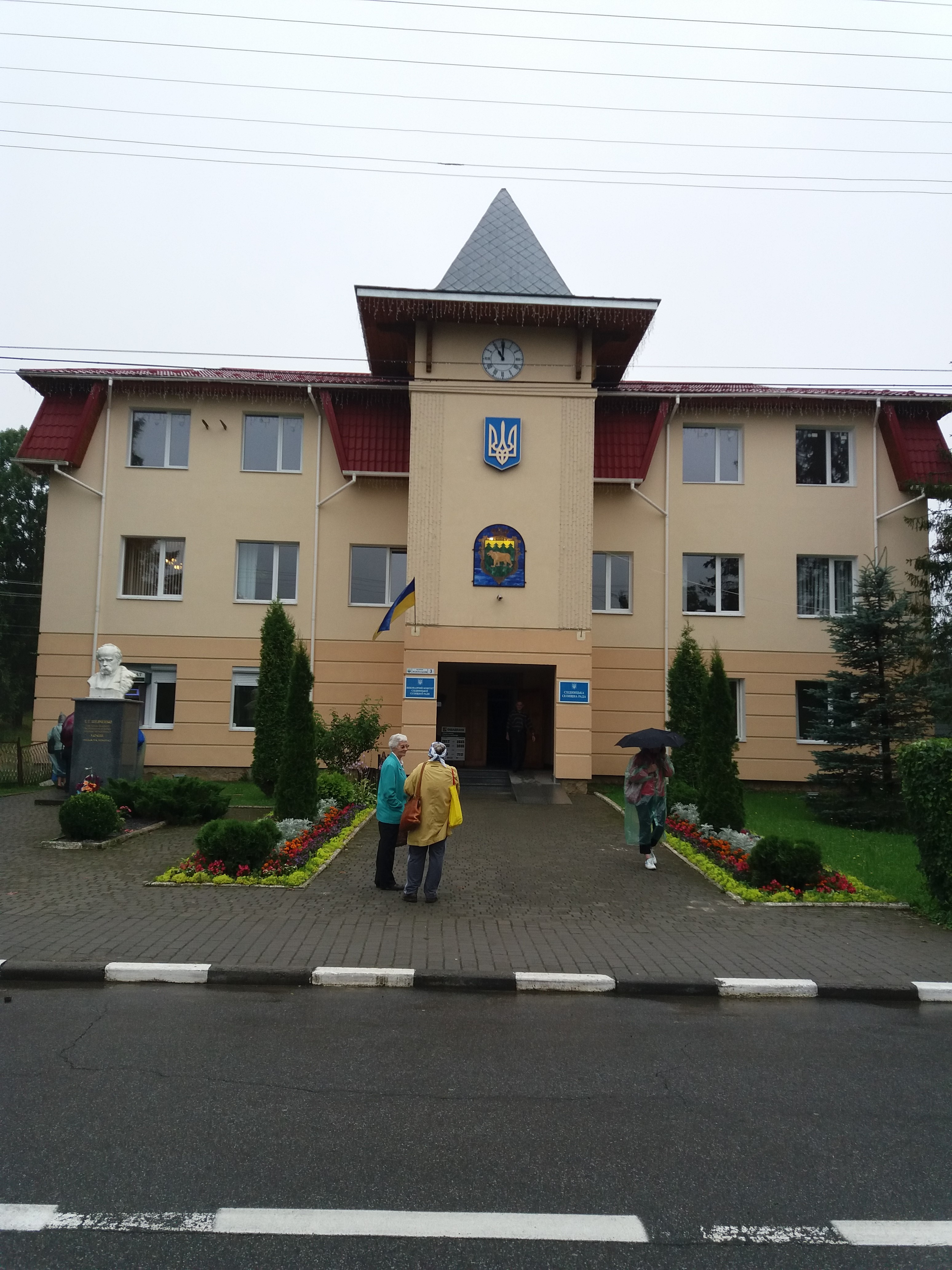
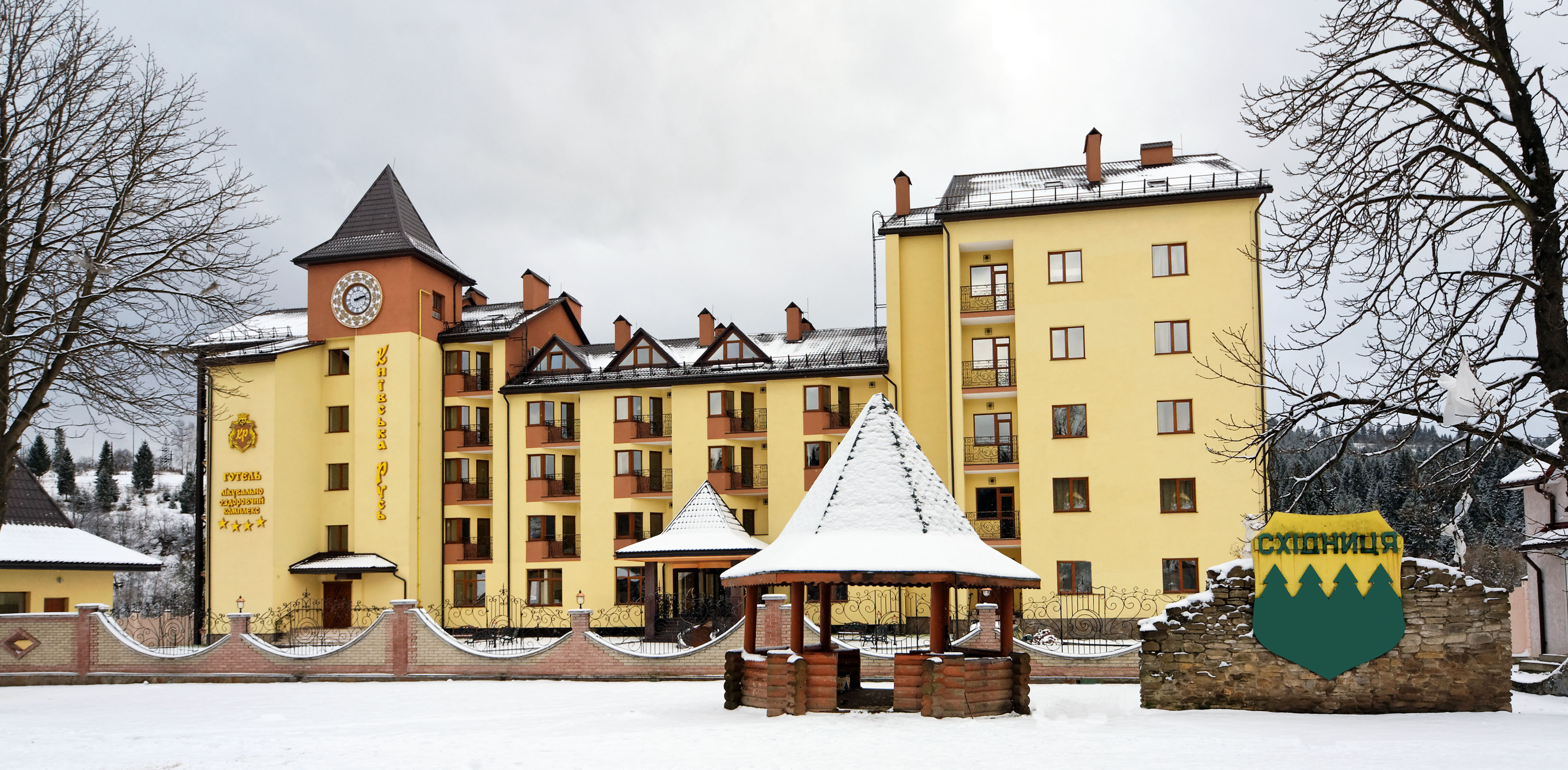

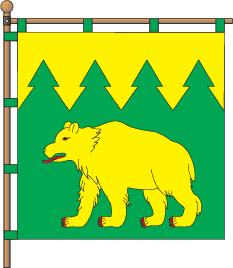
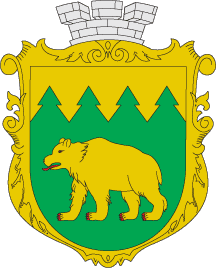
- Flag Coat of arms

- Location within Lviv Oblast Location within Ukraine
- Coordinates: 49°13′25″N 23°21′11″E
- Country: Ukraine
- Oblast: Lviv Oblast
- Raion: Drohobych Raion
- Hromada: Skhidnytsia settlement hromada
- Established: 15th century

Area
  - Total: 69 km^{2} (27 sq mi)
- Elevation /(average value of): 750 m (2,460 ft)

Population (2022)
  - Total: 2,250
  - Density: 33/km^{2} (84/sq mi)
- Time zone: UTC+2 (EET)
  - Summer (DST): UTC+3 (EEST)
- Postal code: 82391
- Area code: +38(03248)
- Website: селище Східниця ^{(Ukrainian)}

Skhidnytsia (Ukrainian: Східниця, Polish: Schodnica) is a rural settlement in Lviv Oblast, Western Ukraine. The settlement is part of Drohobych Raion and represented by the local Skhidnytsia Settlement Council. Skhidnytsia hosts the administration of the Skhidnytsia settlement hromada, one of the hromadas of Ukraine. Population: 2,250 (2022 estimate).

== Description ==
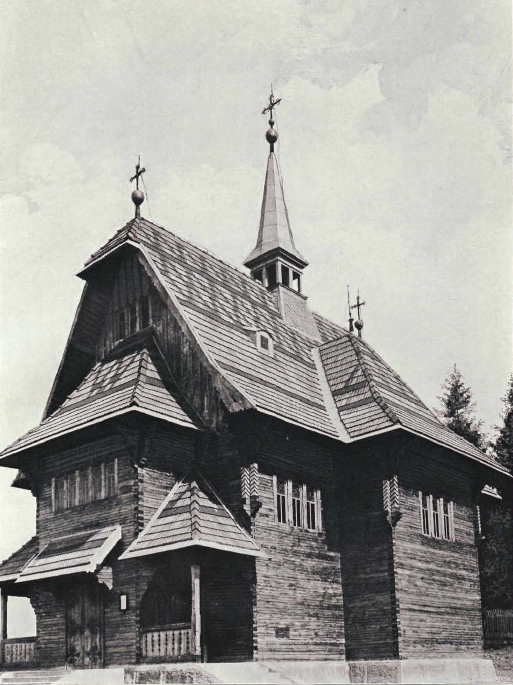
Wooden church (1901)

Skhidnytsia located at an altitude of 600 metres (2,000 ft) – 900 metres (3,000 ft) above sea level. The mountains around the town reach a height of 823 metres (2,700 ft).

Distance to the regional center of Lviv is 102 kilometres (63 mi), to the Boryslav – 14 kilometres (8.7 mi), and to the Drohobych is 25 kilometres (16 mi).

The settlement of Skhidnytsia was first mentioned in the documents of the 15th century.

Skhidnytsia is known for its deposits of mineral water. Today, there are 38 sources and 17 wells with different chemical composition of mineral water.

Until 18 July 2020, Skhidnytsia belonged to Boryslav Municipality. As part of the administrative reform of Ukraine, which reduced the number of raions of Lviv Oblast to seven, Boryslav Municipality was merged into Drohobych Raion.

Until 26 January 2024, Skhidnytsia was designated urban-type settlement. On this day, a new law entered into force which abolished this status, and Skhidnytsia became a rural settlement.

== Synagogue ==
The only wooden synagogue in Ukraine that was not destroyed during World War II stands in Skhidnytsia. It was built in the late 19th century. The simple building has 12 windows and was used up to the German invasion in 1941.

== Gallery ==
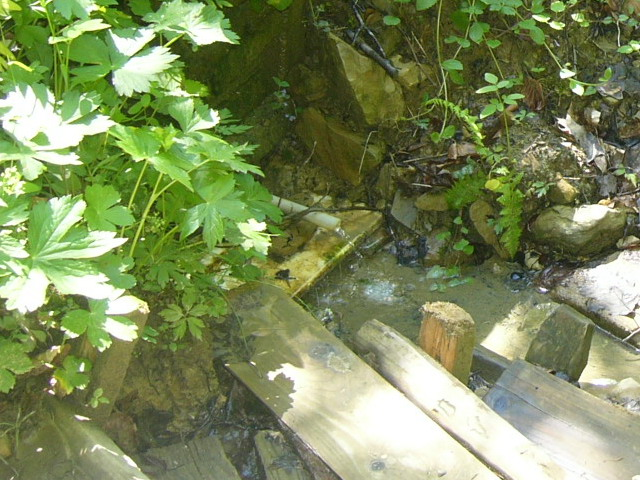

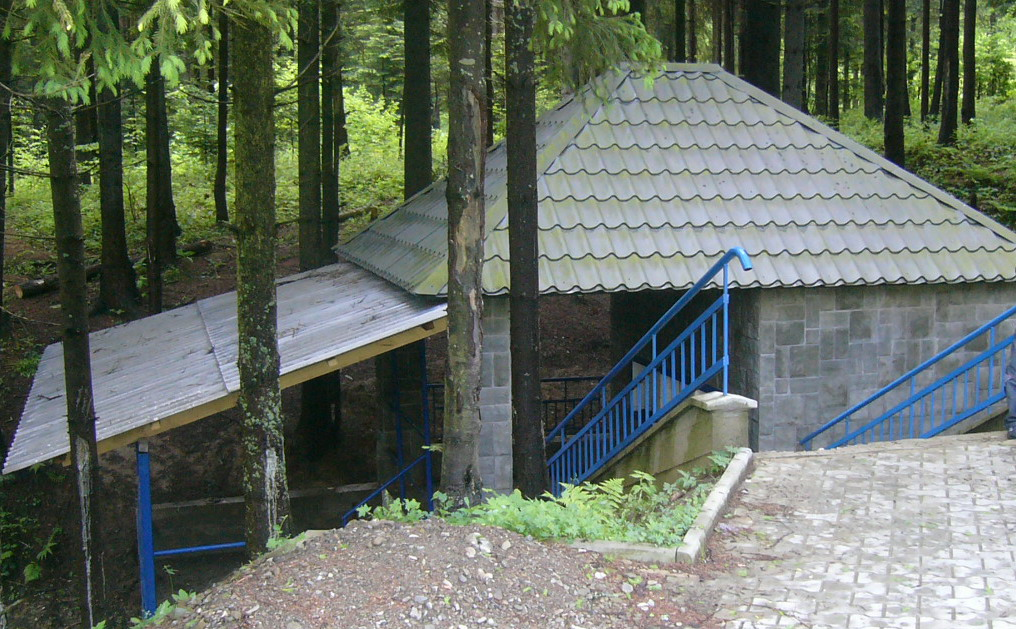

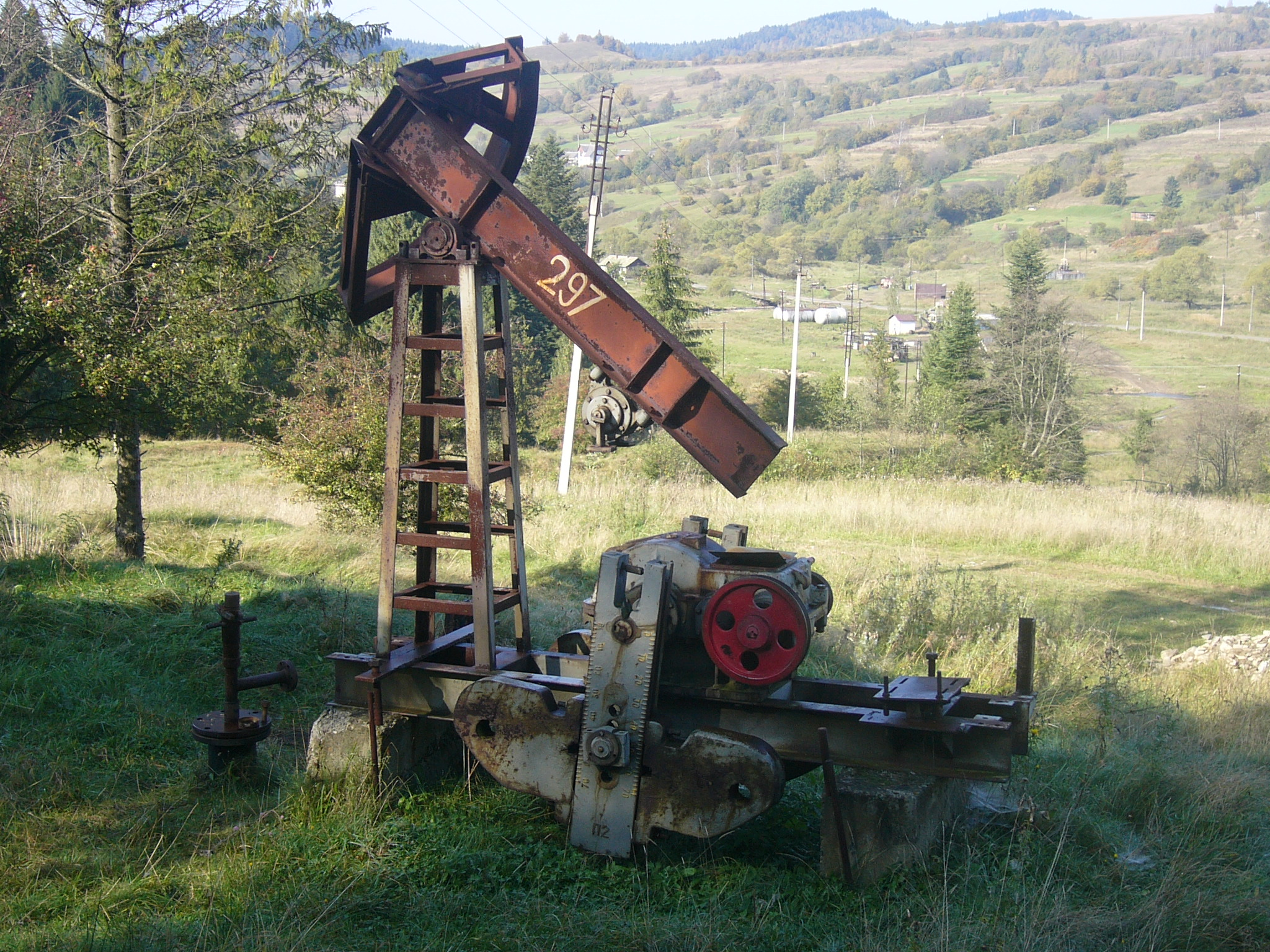
Abandoned oil pump

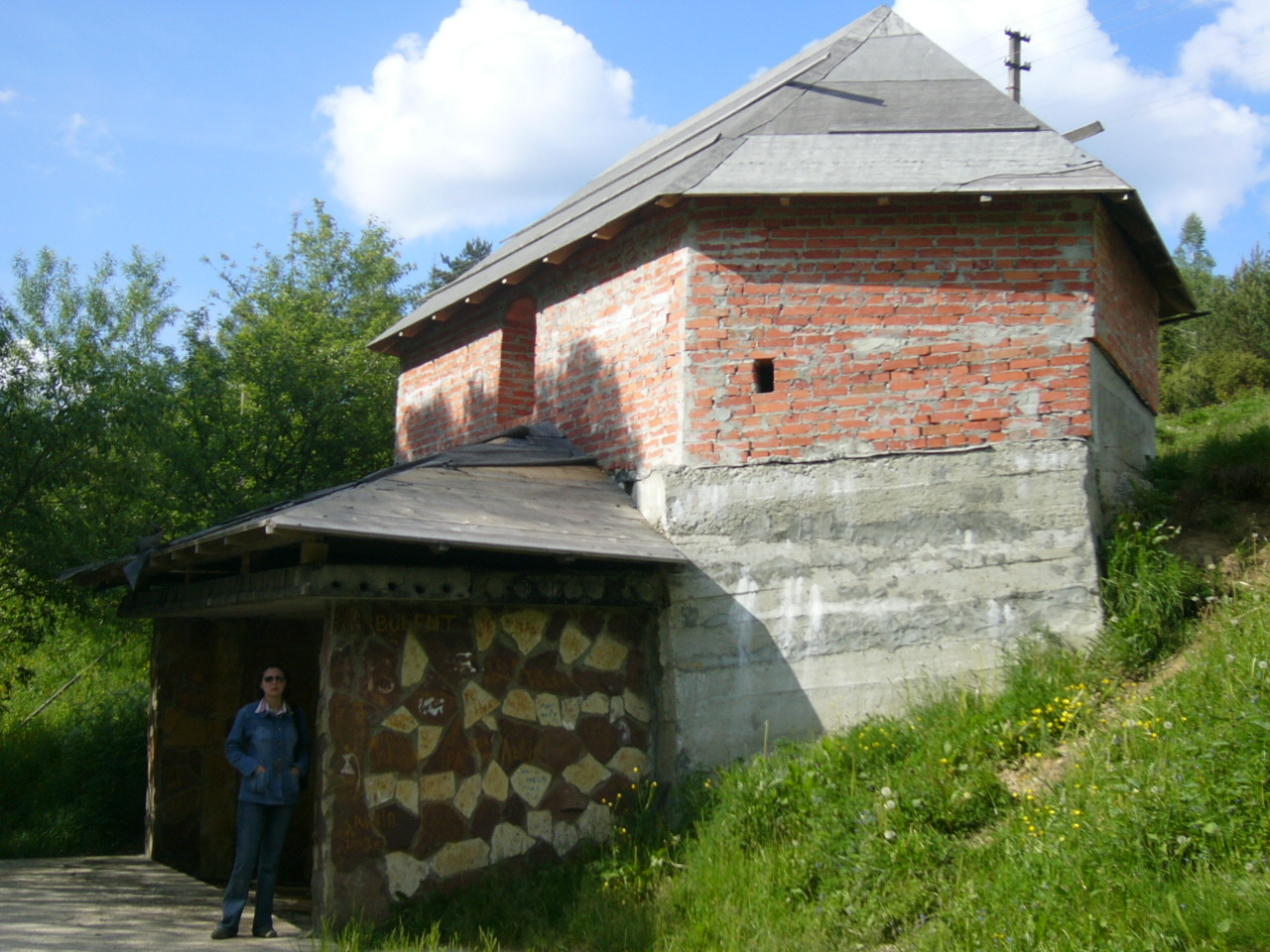

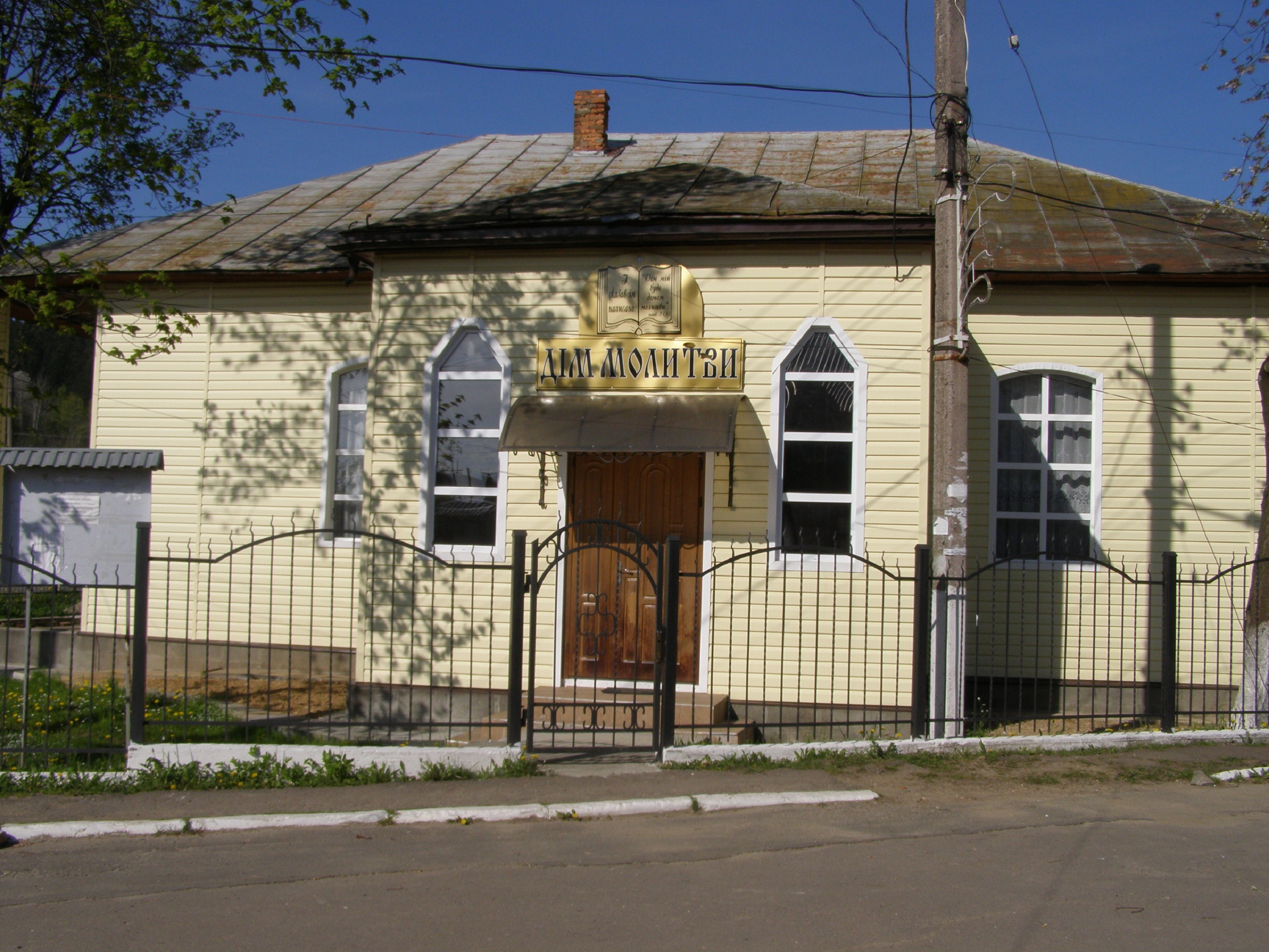
Wooden synagogue
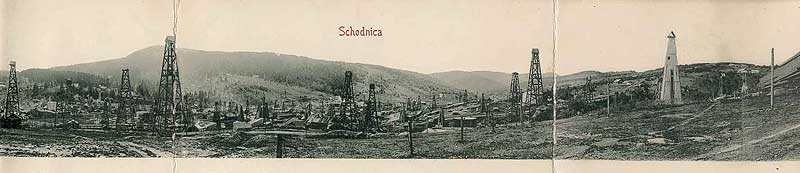
Panoramic view of Skhidnytsia at the beginning of the 20th century
