= Taras Bobanych =

Ukrainian military officer (1989–2022)

- Тарас Миколайович Бобанич
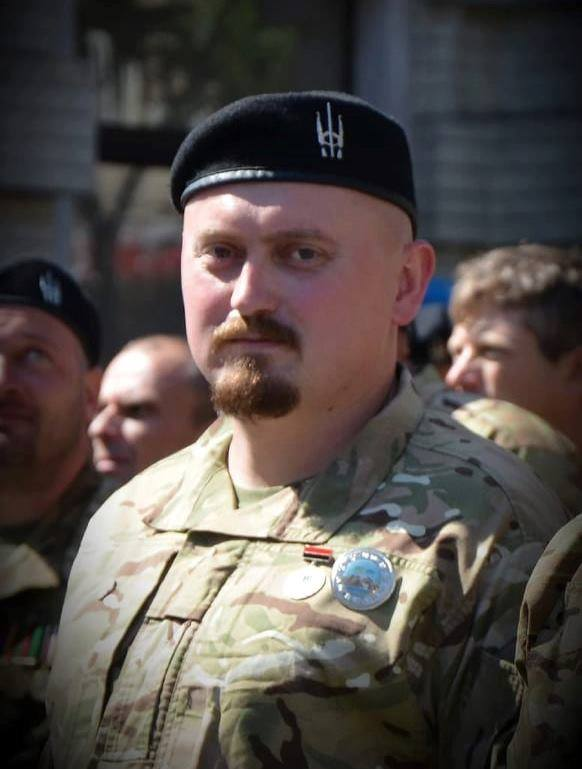
- Born: Taras Mykolayovych Bobanych; 15 March 1989; Truskavets, Ukrainian SSR, Soviet Union (now Ukraine)
- Died: 8 April 2022 (aged 33); Virnopillya, Kharkiv Oblast, Ukraine
- Burial place: Lychakiv Cemetery
- Military career
- Allegiance: Ukraine
- Branch: Ukrainian Ground Forces
- Service years: 2014–2022
- Rank: Junior Lieutenant
- Nickname: Hammer
- Unit: Right Sector Ukrainian Volunteer Corps
- Commands: 2nd Separate Tactical Group
- Conflicts: Russo-Ukrainian war; War in Donbas; Russian invasion of Ukraine; Southern Ukraine campaign †
- Awards: Hero of Ukraine

Taras Mykolayovych Bobanych (Ukrainian: Тарас Миколайович Бобанич; 15 March 1989 – 8 April 2022) was a Ukrainian lawyer, public activist and military officer who was posthumously awarded the Hero of Ukraine in 2022. He is also known by his nickname Hammer.

== Early career ==
Born on 15 March 1989, in the Ukrainian city of Truskavets. He received his secondary education at the Stryi Secondary School No. 9 in 2006. In 2011, Bobanych received his degree from Lviv State University of Internal Affairs' (LvSUIA) Law Faculty.

He headed the electricity unit of the Right Sector in the Lviv Oblast. He had been actively involved in the street right movement in the Lviv area since 2007. He coordinated several national education campaigns and actively participated in them. From 2011 to 2015, he was employed as a lawyer at the Lviv legal company De Lex. He became a member of the military-political group Right Sector at the end of November 2013, and took part in the Euromaidan. He stood up for European principles during the Revolution of Dignity. He oversaw the Right Sector Party's Lviv Regional Branch for a while.

== Military career ==
Bobanych joined the 1st Separate Assault Group of the Right Sector Ukrainian Volunteer Corps in 2014. He was put in charge of the Right Sector Ukrainian Volunteer Corps' 2nd Reserve Battalion since July. 2015 was one of the organizers of the Civil Blockade of Crimea action, which involved a commodities embargo at the administrative border with the Crimean Peninsula, which was under temporary occupation.

Bobanych was appointed deputy commander of the Right Sector Ukrainian Volunteer Corps for reserve unit operations on 30 November 2019. In 2020, he was chosen to join the Right Sector Leadership. After the Russian invasion of Ukraine on 24 February 2022, he headed the Right Sector Volunteer Ukrainian Corps' 2nd Separate Tactical Group.

Bobanych died during a combat mission close to the village of Virnopillya on 8 April 2022 against the Russian Armed Forces. He was killed in combat while supporting his men's evacuation under tank bombardment on the Izium front.

The Holy Apostles Peter and Paul's Garrison Church served as the venue for his funeral on 13 April. Family, friends, fellow troops, government officials, members of public groups, and LvSUIA attended. Later that day, he was laid to rest in the Lychakiv Cemetery in Lviv.

== Honours ==
The Lviv City Council announced that the Korolenko Street will be renamed in his honor on 24 May 2022, a memorial plaque on the façade of the Stryi Secondary School No. 9 on 17 October 2022, a memorial plaque on Sobornosti Street, No. 5 in Poltava, and a commemorative plaque was placed at the LvSUIA on 28 June 2023. Bobanych has received honours and recognitions such as:

- Hero of Ukraine Order of the Gold Star (24 August 2022)
- Defense of Avdiivka Medal

== Bibliography ==
- Koval, Roman (2023). Побратима мого зачепила куля вражая [My brother was hit by an enemy's bullet] (in Ukrainian). Kyiv: Mark Melnyk Publishing House.
