= Ulychne =

Rural locality in Lviv Oblast, Ukraine

Ulychne Уличне
- Location in Lviv Oblast Ulychne (Ukraine)
- Coordinates: 49°13′55″N 23°38′12″E
- Country: Ukraine
- Oblast: Lviv Oblast
- Raion: Drohobych Raion
- Hromada: Truskavets urban hromada
- Time zone: UTC+2 (EET)
  - Summer (DST): UTC+3 (EEST)
- Postal code: 82177

Ulychne (Ukrainian: Уличне) is a village in the Truskavets urban hromada of the Drohobych Raion of Lviv Oblast in Ukraine.

== History ==
On 19 July 2020, as a result of the administrative-territorial reform and liquidation of the Drohobych Raion, the village became part of the Drohobych Raion.

== Religion ==
- Saint Paraskeva church (1910, architect Vasyl Nahirnyi)
- Church of the Intercession

== Notable residents ==
- Ihor Bilan (born 1973), Ukrainian professional football coach and a former player
- Myroslav Stelmakhovych (1934–1998), Doctor of Pedagogical Sciences, Professor, Full Member of the Academy of Pedagogical Sciences of Ukraine
- Yurii Stetsyk (born 1977), Ukrainian historian, Doctor of Historical Sciences, Professor

== Bibliography ==
- "Uliczno". Geographical Dictionary of the Kingdom of Poland (in Polish). 12. Warszawa: Kasa im. Józefa Mianowskiego. 1892. p. 784.
- "Uliczno". Geographical Dictionary of the Kingdom of Poland (in Polish). p. 673.
