= Truskavets urban hromada =

Urban hromada in Lviv Oblast, Ukraine

Truskavets urban hromada Трускавецька міська громада
- Hromada
- Seal

- Location within Lviv Oblast Location within Ukraine
- Coordinates: 49°16′50″N 23°30′18″E
- Country: Ukraine
- Oblast (province): Lviv Oblast
- Raion (district): Drohobych Raion

Area
  - Total: 207.9 km^{2} (80.3 sq mi)

Population (2023)
  - Total: 40,793
- Website: www.tmr.gov.ua

Truskavets urban territorial hromada (Ukrainian: Трускавецька міська територіальна громада, romanized: Truskavetska miska terytorialna hromada) is one of the hromadas of Ukraine, located in Drohobych Raion in the country's western Lviv Oblast. Its capital is the city of Truskavets.

The hromada has an area of 207.9 km^{2} (80.3 mi^{2}), as well as a population of 40,793 (as of 2023).

== Composition ==
In addition to one city (Truskavets), the hromada includes seven villages:

- Bystryi
- Dobrohostiv
- Modrychi
- Oriv
- Stanylia
- Ulychne
- Zymivky
