= Truskavets =

City in Lviv Oblast, Ukraine

Truskavets Трускавець
- City
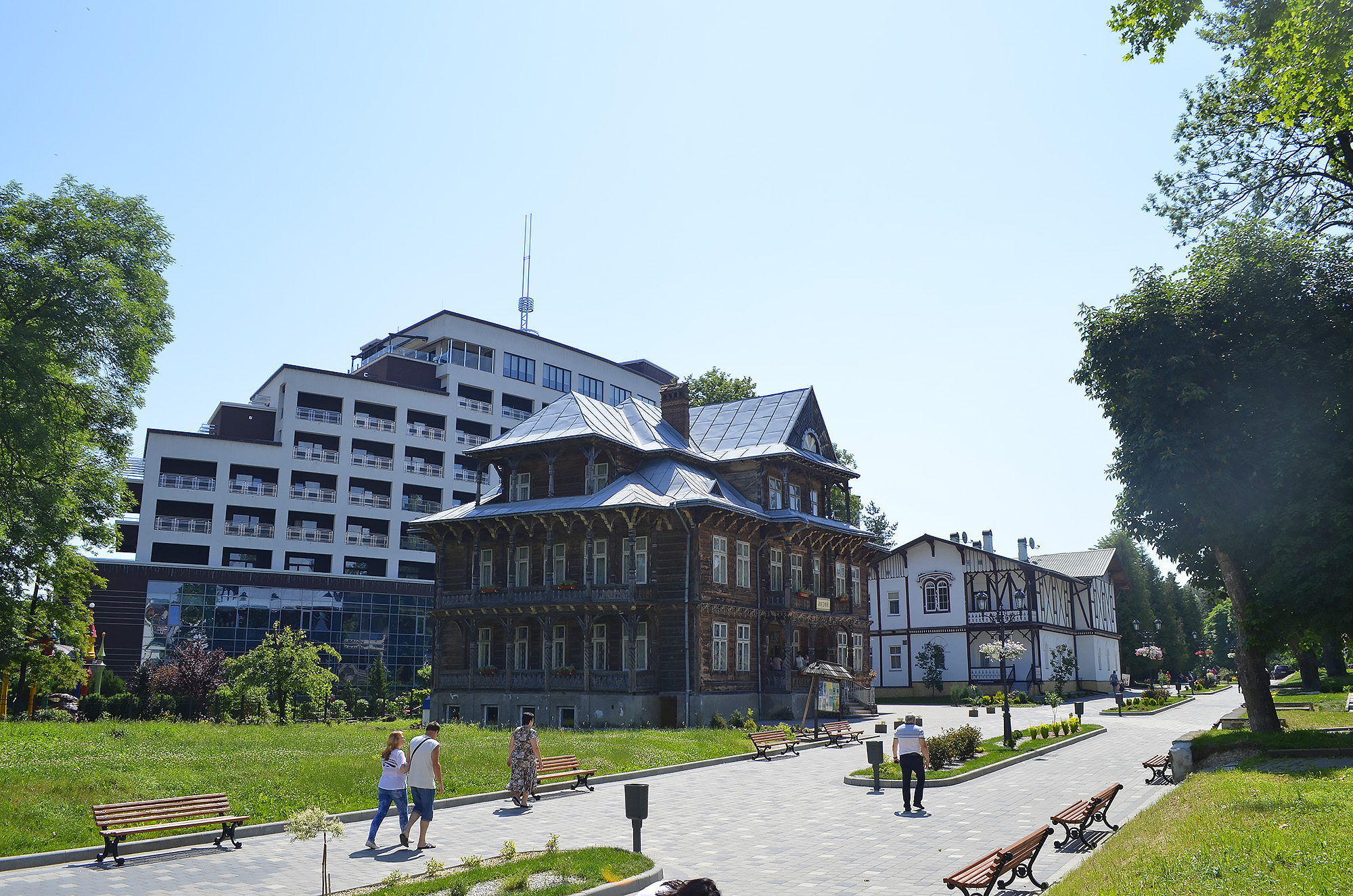
- From left to right: Mirotel Resort SPA, Villa Goplana, and Villa Postiy

- Flag Coat of arms

- Location within Lviv Oblast Location within Ukraine
- Coordinates: 49°16′50″N 23°30′18″E
- Country: Ukraine
- Oblast: Lviv Oblast
- Raion: Drohobych Raion
- Hromada: Truskavets urban hromada

Area
  - Total: 8 km^{2} (3.1 sq mi)

Population (2022)
  - Total: 28,287
  - Density: 3,500/km^{2} (9,200/sq mi)
- Time zone: UTC+2 (EET)
  - Summer (DST): UTC+3 (EEST)
- Postal code: 82200
- Area code: +380-3247
- Website: https://truskavets.ua/en/

Truskavets (Ukrainian: Трускавець, IPA: [trʊskɐˈwɛtsʲ]; Polish: Truskawiec) is a city in Drohobych Raion, western Ukraine's Lviv Oblast (region), near the border with Poland. It hosts the administration of Truskavets urban hromada, one of the hromadas of Ukraine. The population is approximately 28,287 (2022 estimate).

Truskavets is famous for its mineral springs, which have made it one of Ukraine's great resorts. For most visitors the primary goal is consuming the various "local waters". The most famous is the naphtha and sulfur-scented, slightly saline "Naftusia". The town lies in a little valley in the Carpathian foothills and is easily reached from Lviv by bus or train. The vast majority of tourists who come to Truskavets are Ukrainian or Belarusian.

The modern coat of arms of the city depicts a goose with raised wings and a branch in its beak. According to history, it symbolizes vigilance, kindness and health.

In 2000, a special economic zone (SEZ) was established in Truskavets for the period of 20 years. Known as "Kurortopolis Truskavets", the SEZ offered various tax privileges for businesses and investors. Some 13 investment projects were approved under its framework, with the majority focusing on health and medical treatment.

== Name ==
The origin of the city's name is still debated by historians. Most researchers believe that the word Truskavets comes from the Old East Slavic name Trushko, or Trusko, which derived to Truskovich, and eventually to Truskavets.

According to another version, the name of the city was influenced by the Lithuanian language. In Lithuanian, druska means salt, and Prykarpattia is a well-known center of salt production. In favor of this option, the close interstate relations of the Galicia-Volhynia Principality and the Grand Duchy of Lithuania in the 12th–15th centuries testify.

The third version traces the origin of the word to the dialect word trusok or trusk (small brush, dry wood chips) — cf. a Polish toponym Truskolyasy (forests where coniferous needles attacked), which refers to several villages in Poland.

There is also a popular but erroneous version that Truskavets is a modified form of the Polish word truskawka (strawberry, Latin Fragaria ananassa). Strawberries of this type appeared in Europe only after 1714 and were brought from Chile by the French officer Fresier, while the name of the city first appears in the 15th century. Instead, the Polish name for the European strawberry species Fragaria moschata is poziomka.

== History ==
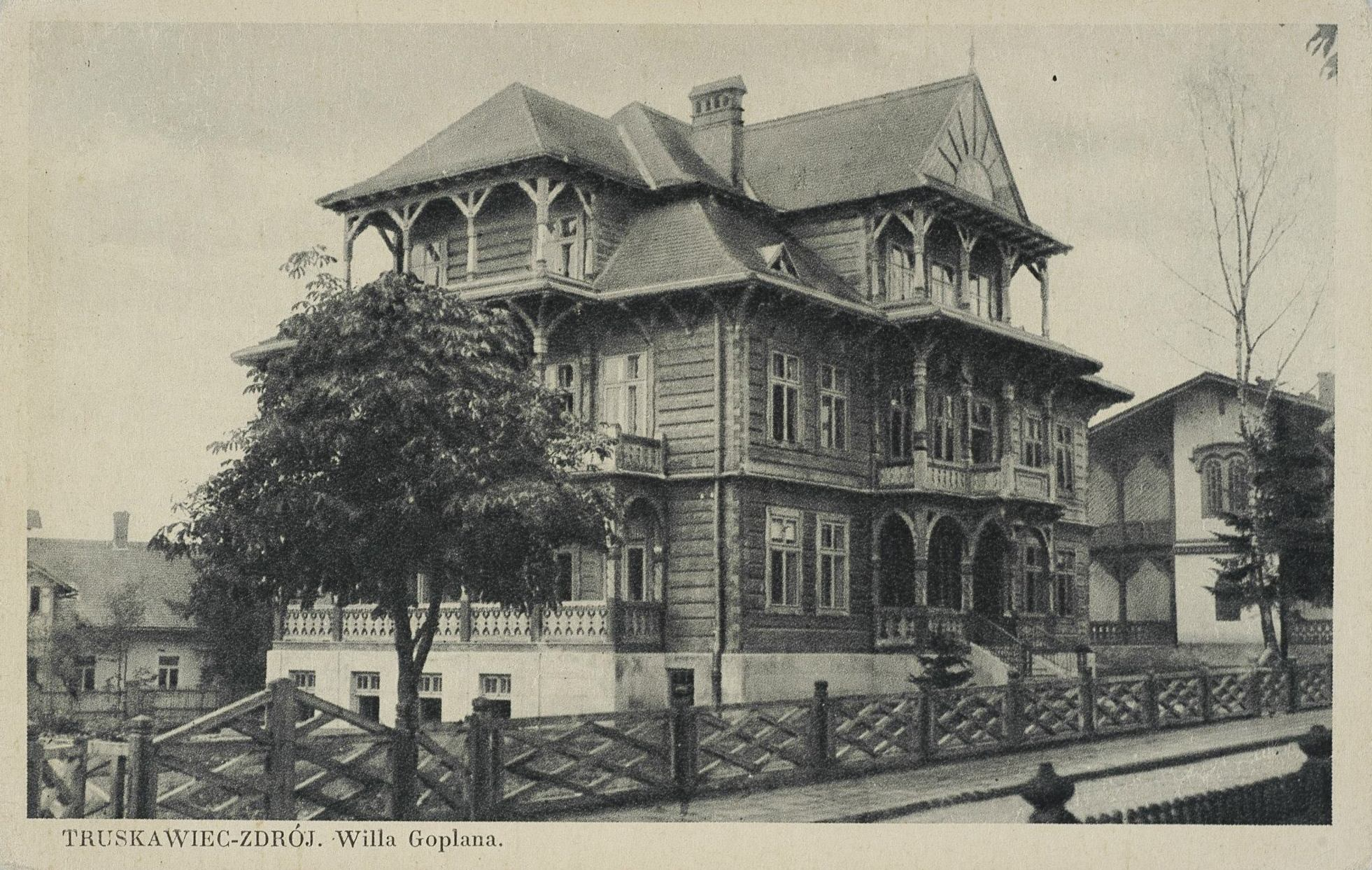
Villa Goplana, home of Rajmund Jarosz, owner of the spa from 1911 to 1937

Truskavets, then known as Truskawiec, was first mentioned in 1469. The Polish royal doctor Wojciech Oczko was the first to describe local waters in 1578. At that time the village was the property of the Kings of Poland, and was located in the Ruthenian Voivodeship in the Lesser Poland Province of the Polish Crown until the First Partition of Poland in 1772, when it fell to Austria. First baths were opened here in 1827. In 1836, Józef Micewski, with support of Agenor Goluchowski, initiated construction of the spa complex. In 1853, the village was visited by Archduke Karl Ludwig of Austria. In the mid-19th century, a Catholic church was built, financed by visitors' contributions. Thanks to the liberalization of Austrian policy towards minorities, including Poles, in 1880 the spa became the property of a company whose chairman was Adam Stanisław Sapieha, and then it was expanded. In 1898, a monument to Polish national poet Adam Mickiewicz, in the 100th anniversary of his birth, was unveiled in the spa park. In 1911, a rail station was opened here, and by 1913, the town was receiving around 5,000 visitors per year. The spa was not destroyed during World War I, however, the number of visitors dropped significantly.

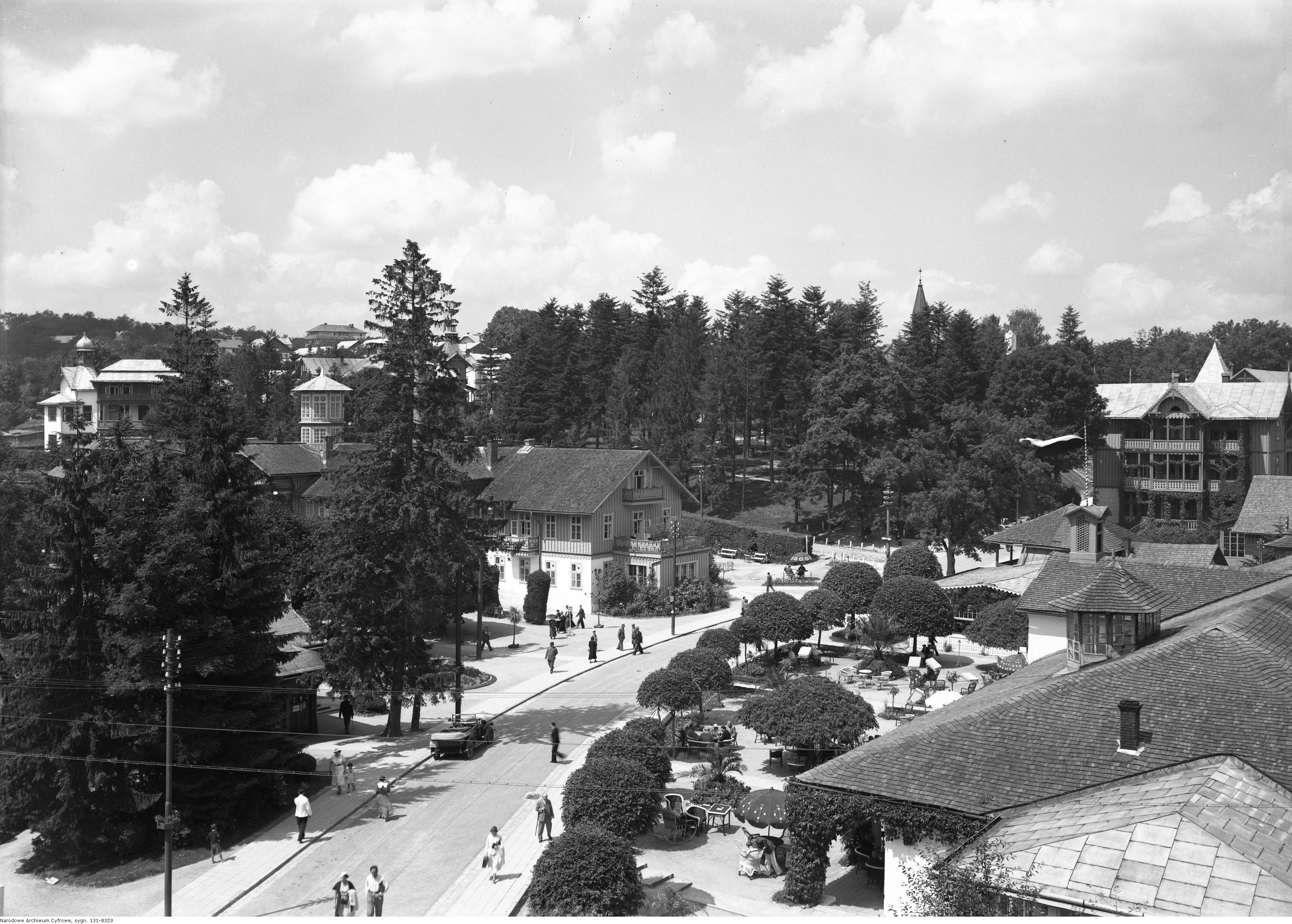
Truskavets in the 1930s

Following the collapse of the Austro-Hungarian Empire, the Polish–Ukrainian War and the Polish–Soviet War, Truskawiec became part of Poland again. Administratively it was the seat of Gmina Truskawiec, located in the Drohobycz County of the Lwów Voivodeship. As the spa was not destroyed in these conflicts, activity resumed quickly, as early as 1920 and Truskawiec soon emerged as a popular spa destination. In the 1920s and 1930s, almost 300 hotels, villas and guest houses were built here. The town was awarded three gold medals as the country's best spa resort. Next to Krynica-Zdrój, it was the most visited and most popular resort in Poland. A number of notable Polish personalities visited Truskawiec during that era, including politicians (Stanisław Wojciechowski, Józef Piłsudski, Wincenty Witos, Ignacy Daszyński), artists (Eugeniusz Bodo, Adolf Dymsza, Julian Tuwim, Stanisław Ignacy Witkiewicz, Bruno Schulz, Zofia Nałkowska, Marian Hemar, Hanka Ordonówna, Jan Kiepura, Zofia Batycka, Antoni Słonimski), athletes (Stanisława Walasiewicz, Halina Konopacka, Janusz Kusociński) and Generals Stanisław Maczek and Kazimierz Sosnkowski. Numerous guests from abroad came there as well. In 1935, the Prime Minister and future president of Estonia Konstantin Päts visited the spa. Rajmund Jarosz, who was the owner of the spa since 1911, founded the Museum of Natural History (Muzeum Przyrodnicze) and a salt-sulfur pool, later destroyed during World War II.

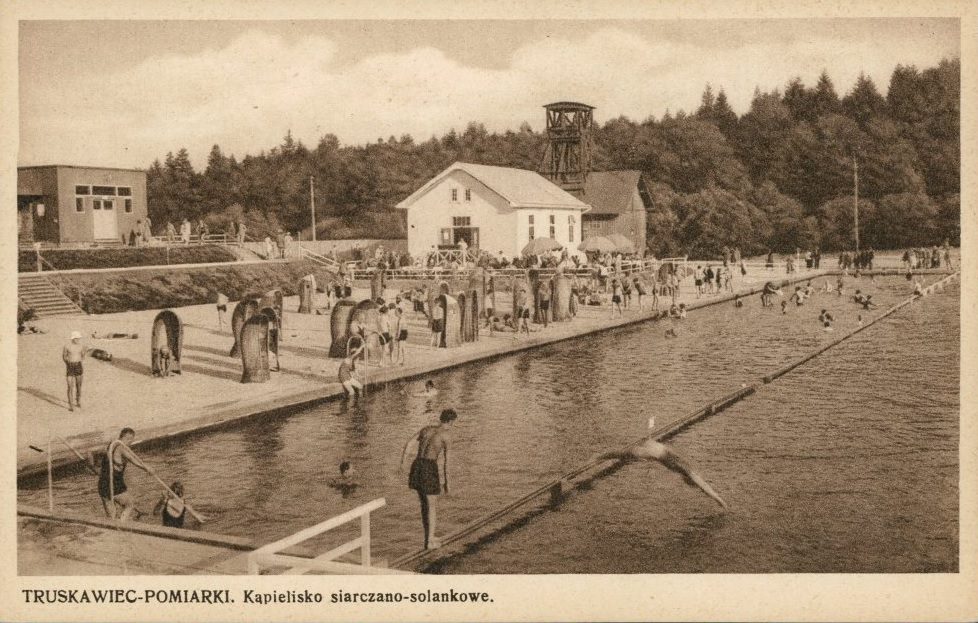
A salt-sulfur pool in the 1930s, destroyed during World War II

On 29 August 1931, Vasyl Bilas and Dmytro Danylyshyn, two members of the Organization of Ukrainian Nationalists, assassinated Tadeusz Hołówko, a Polish cabinet minister and known advocate of Polish-Ukrainian rapprochement vacationing in Truskawiec. This caused an increase in Polish-Ukrainian tension, which culminated in the Ukrainian genocide of Poles in 1943.

After the Soviet invasion of Poland in 1939, the spa was transformed into a sanatorium for Red Army soldiers. From 1941 to 1944 it was under German occupation, and after 1944 under Soviet occupation again. Under the Potsdam Agreement of 1945, it was taken from Poland and annexed by the Soviet Union. Under Soviet rule, most of the historic buildings were destroyed and replaced with typical Soviet architecture.

In 2008, the Adam Mickiewicz monument, which survived World War II and Soviet rule, was renovated.

Until 18 July 2020, Truskavets was incorporated as a city of oblast significance. In July 2020, as part of the administrative reform of Ukraine, which reduced the number of raions of Lviv Oblast to seven, the city of Truskavets was merged into Drohobych Raion.

Truskavets is part of the European Route of Historic Thermal Towns.

== Notable people ==
- Taras Bobanych (1989–2022), Ukrainian lawyer and soldier

== Twin towns ==
Truskavets is twinned with:

- Działdowo, Poland
- Jasło, Poland, since August 2005
- Limanowa, Poland
- Dolný Kubín, Slovakia

== Gallery ==
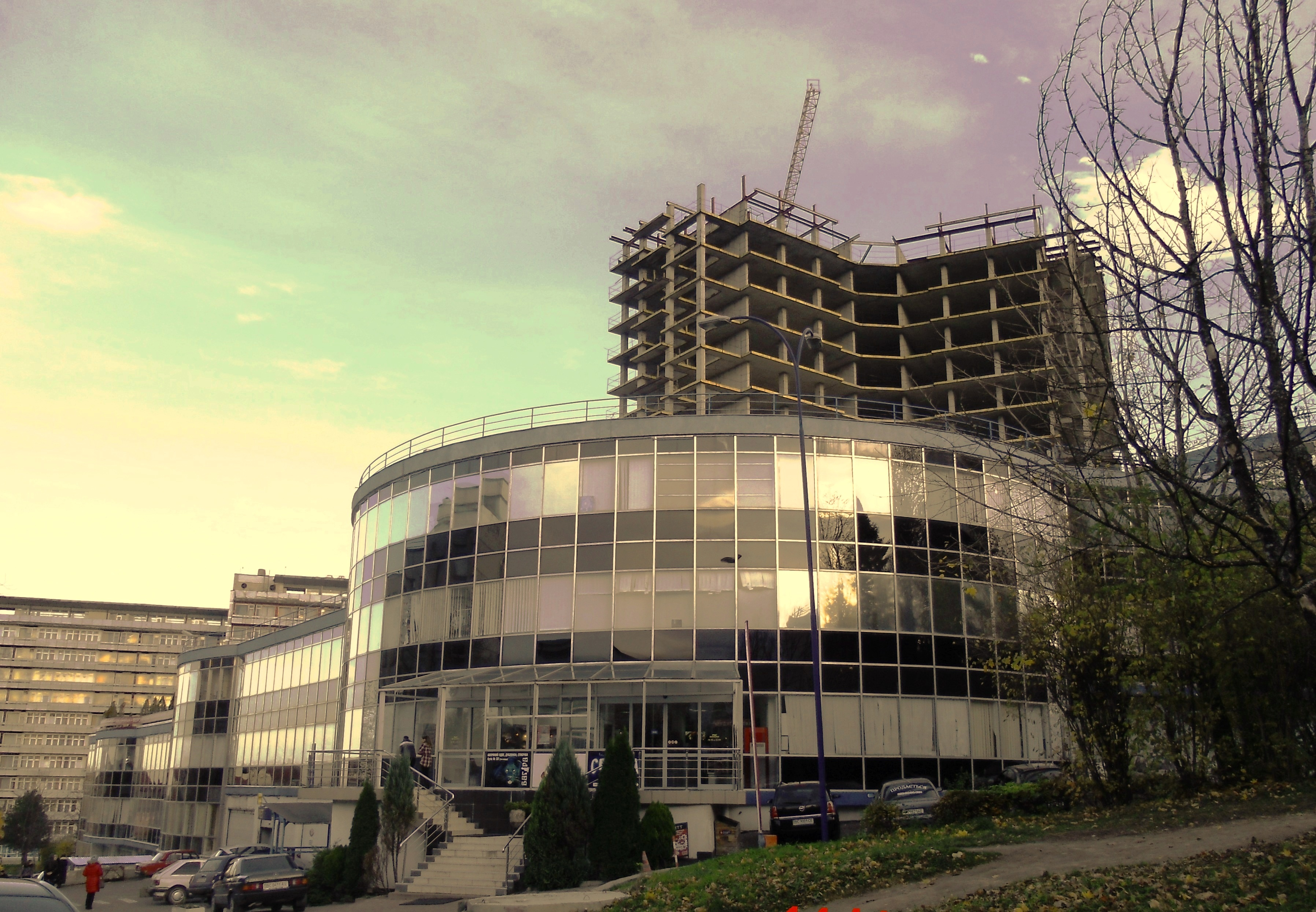
Trading House

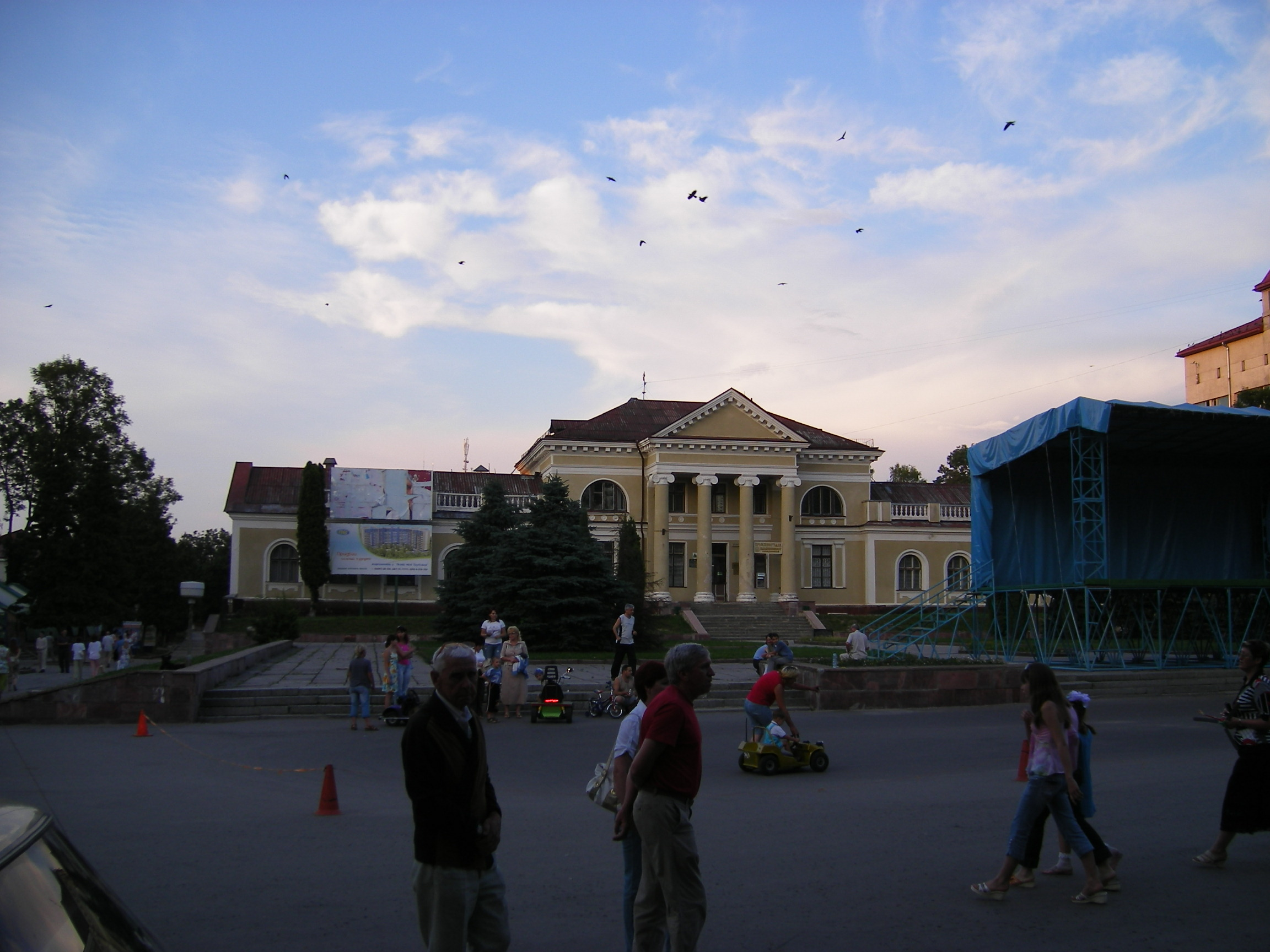
Old Town Hall

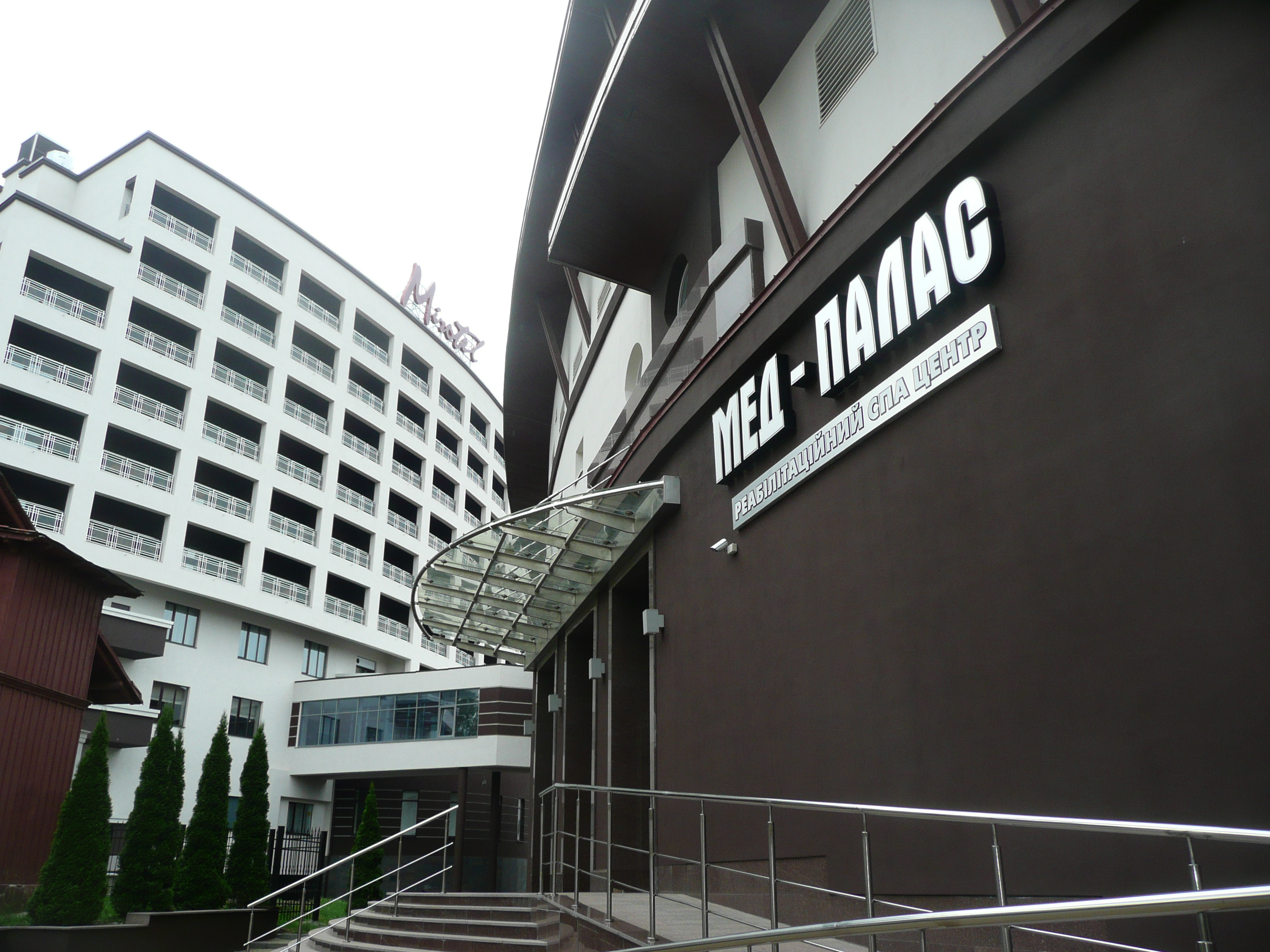
Spa Rehabilitation Center

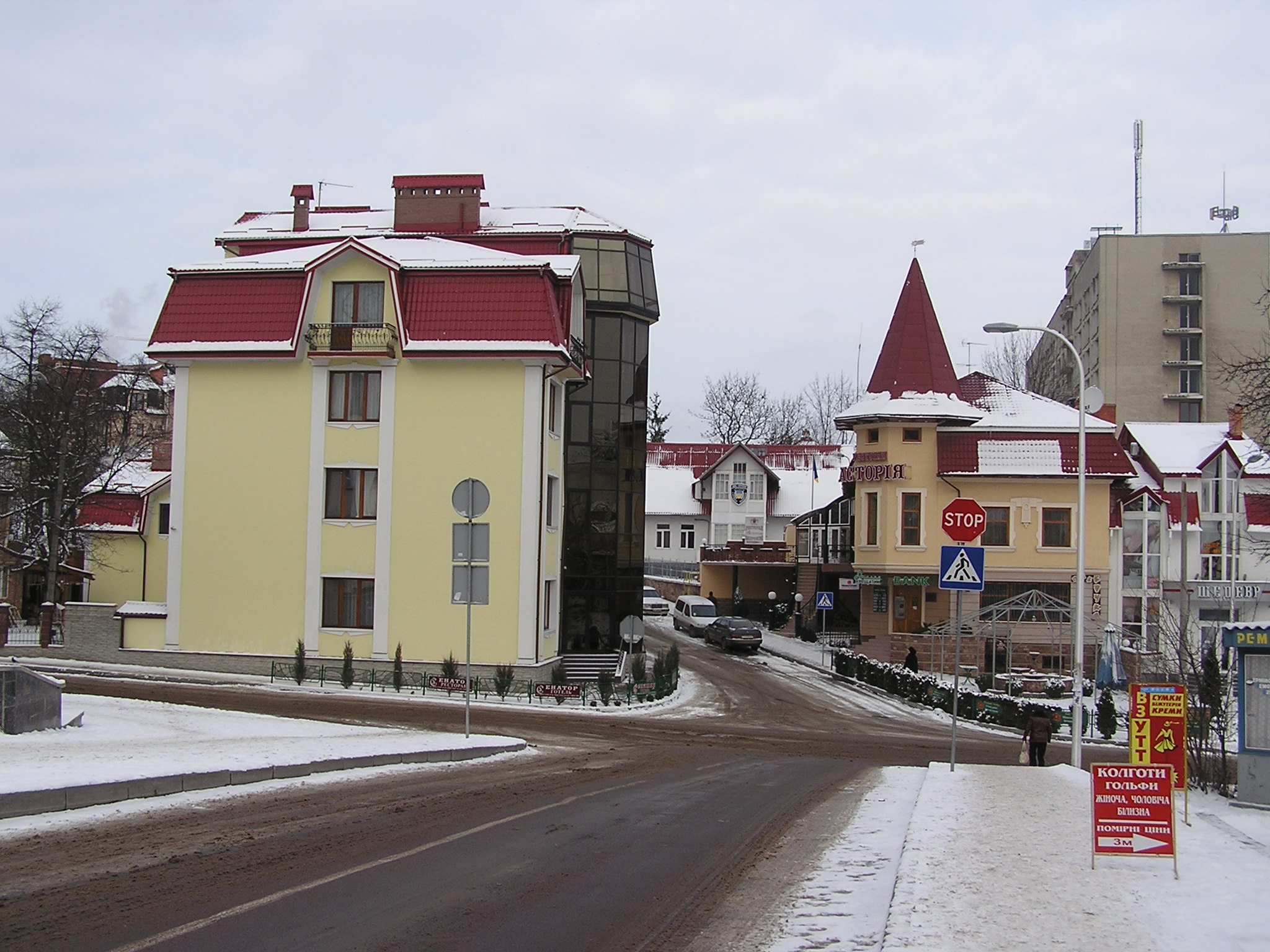
Downtown

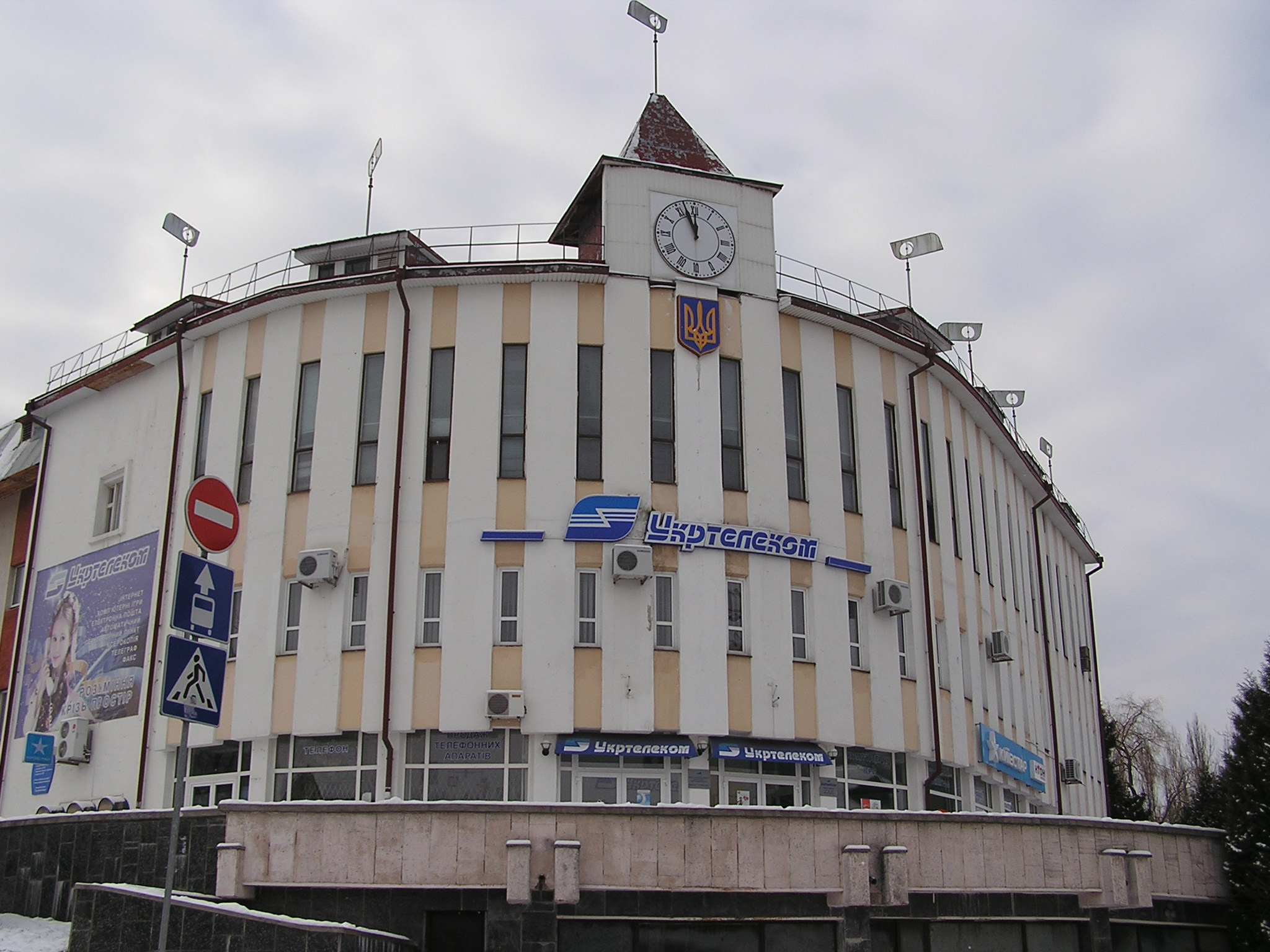
City hall

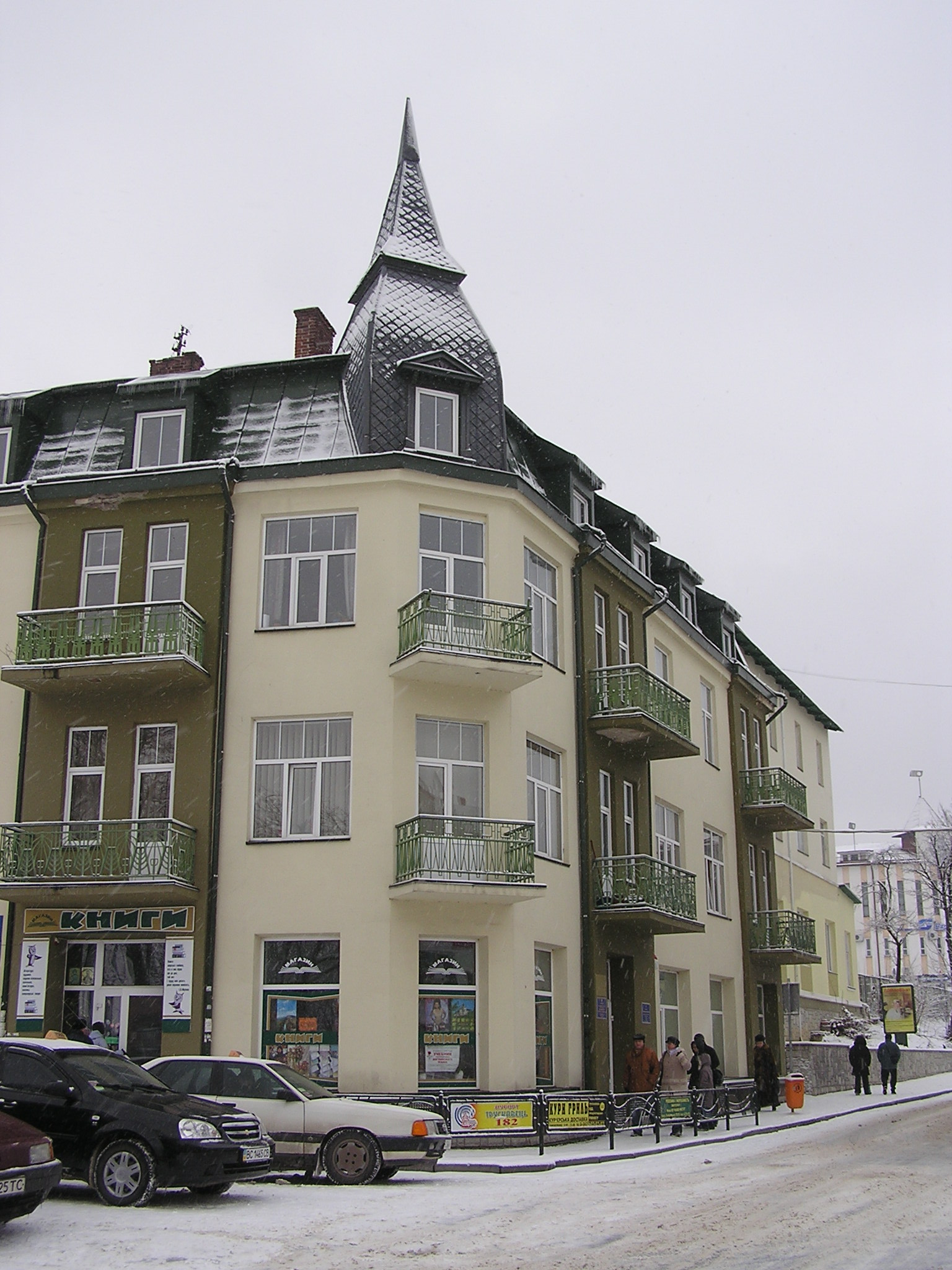
Residential building

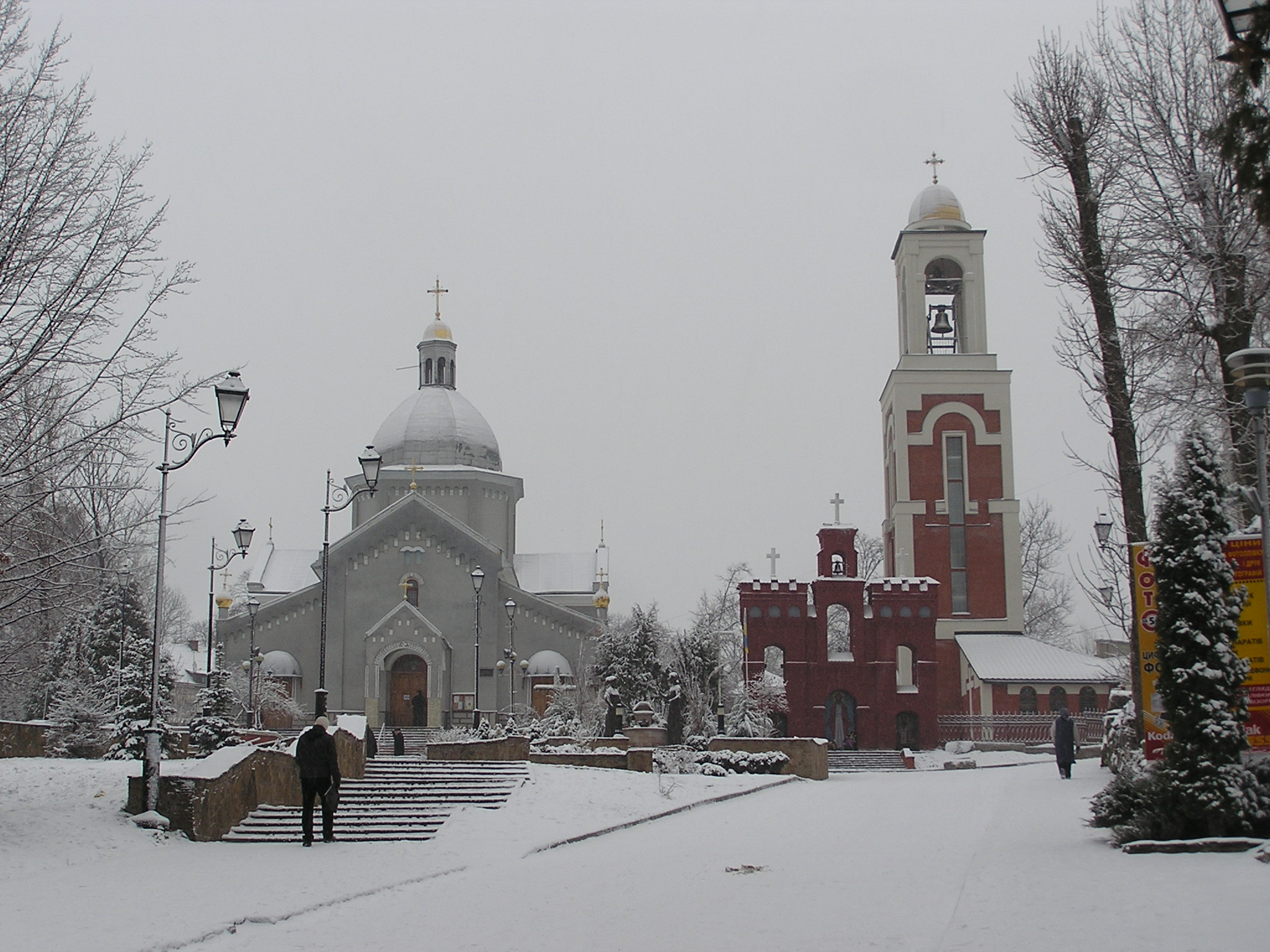
St. Nicholas Church

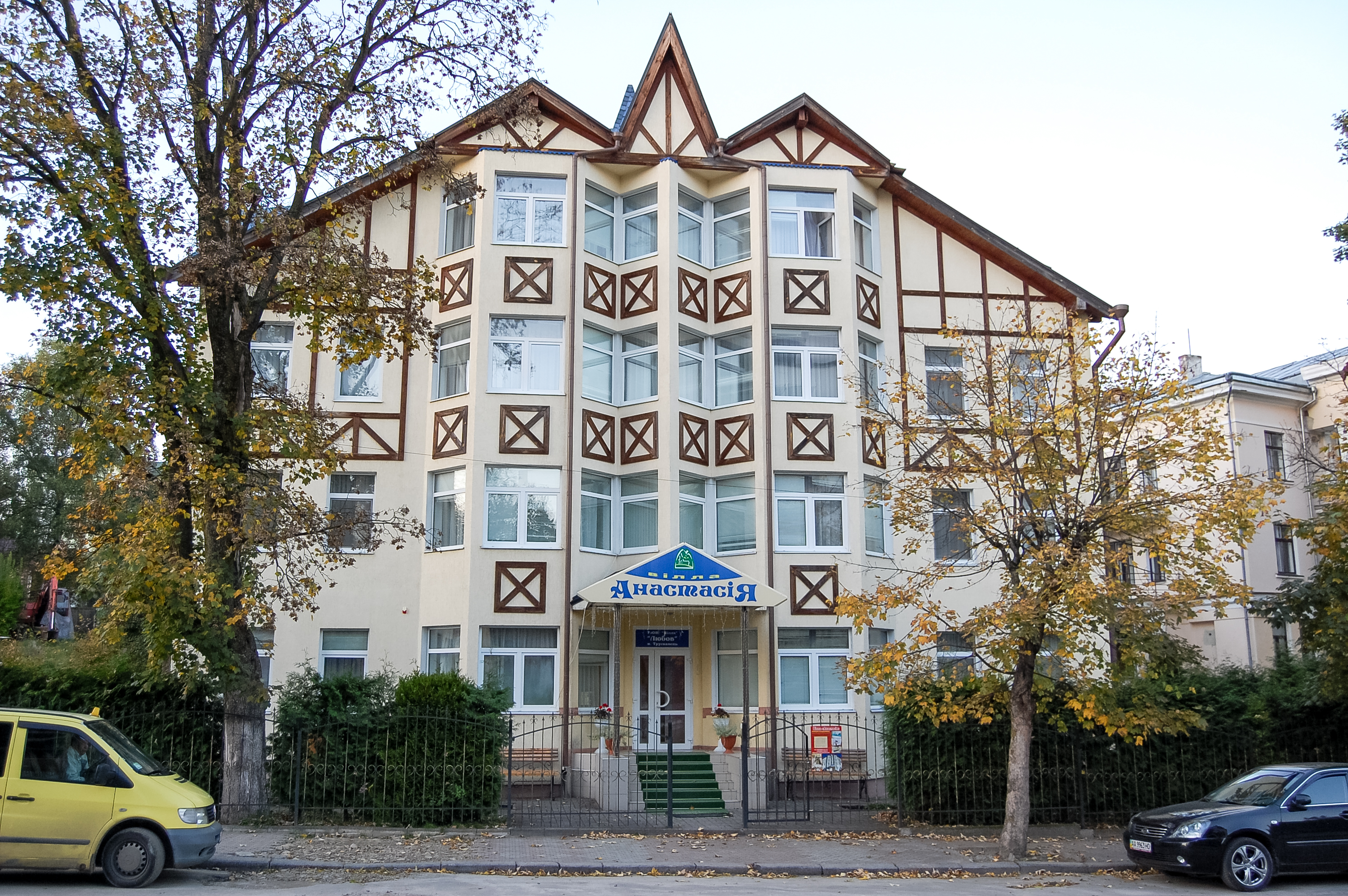
Villa Anastasia

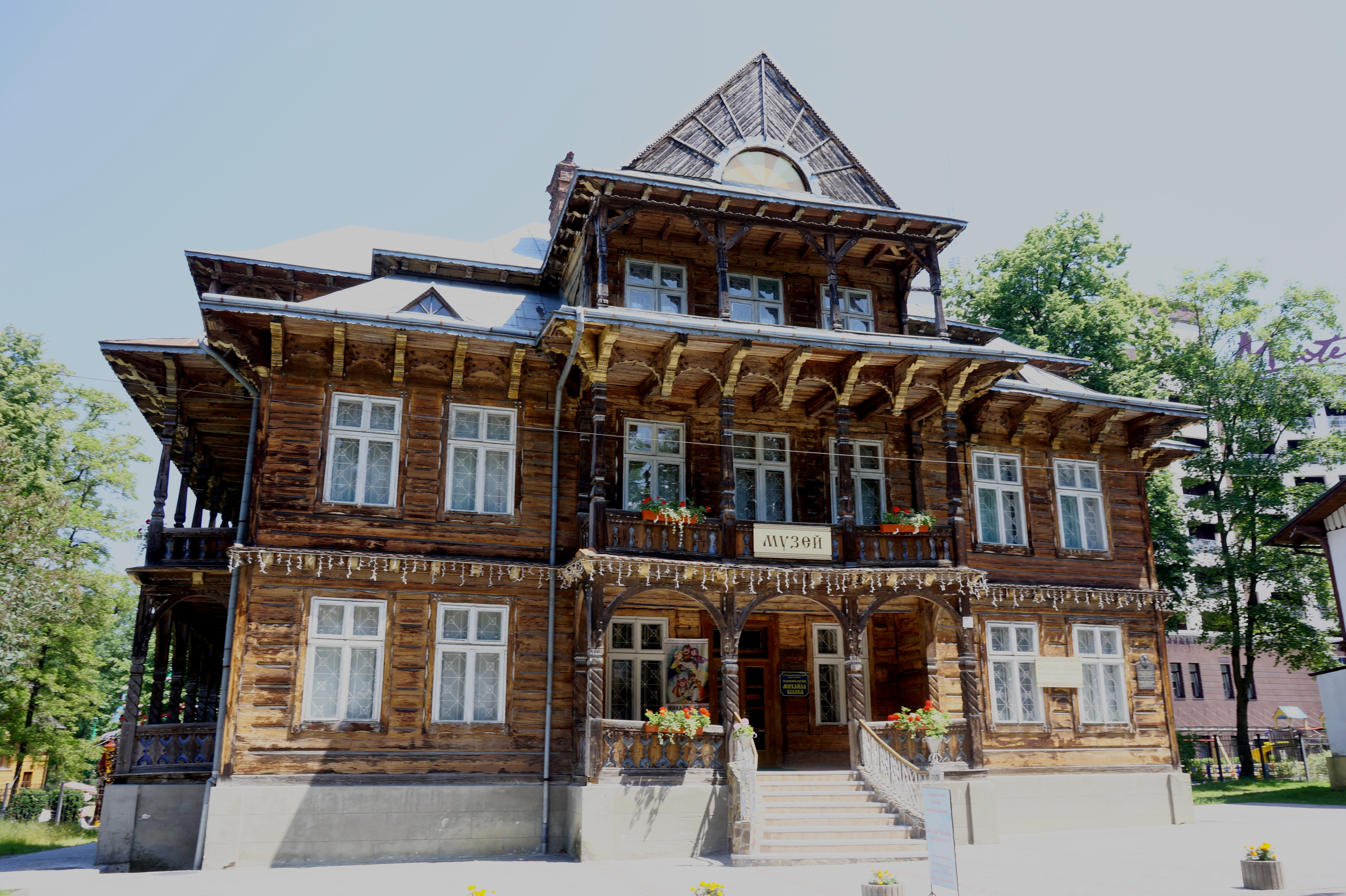
Villa Goplana, housing the City Museum

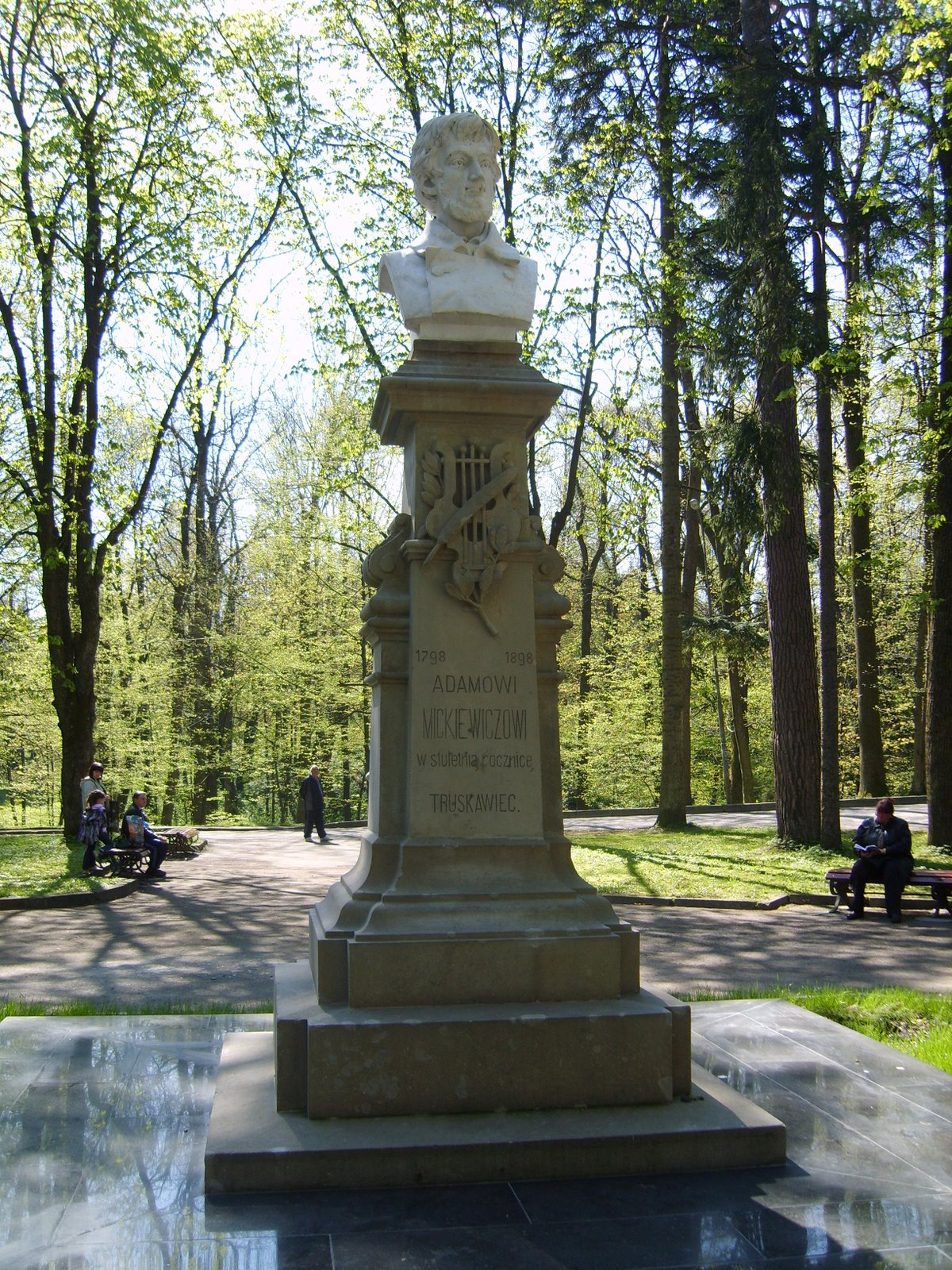
Adam Mickiewicz statue in Truskavets city park

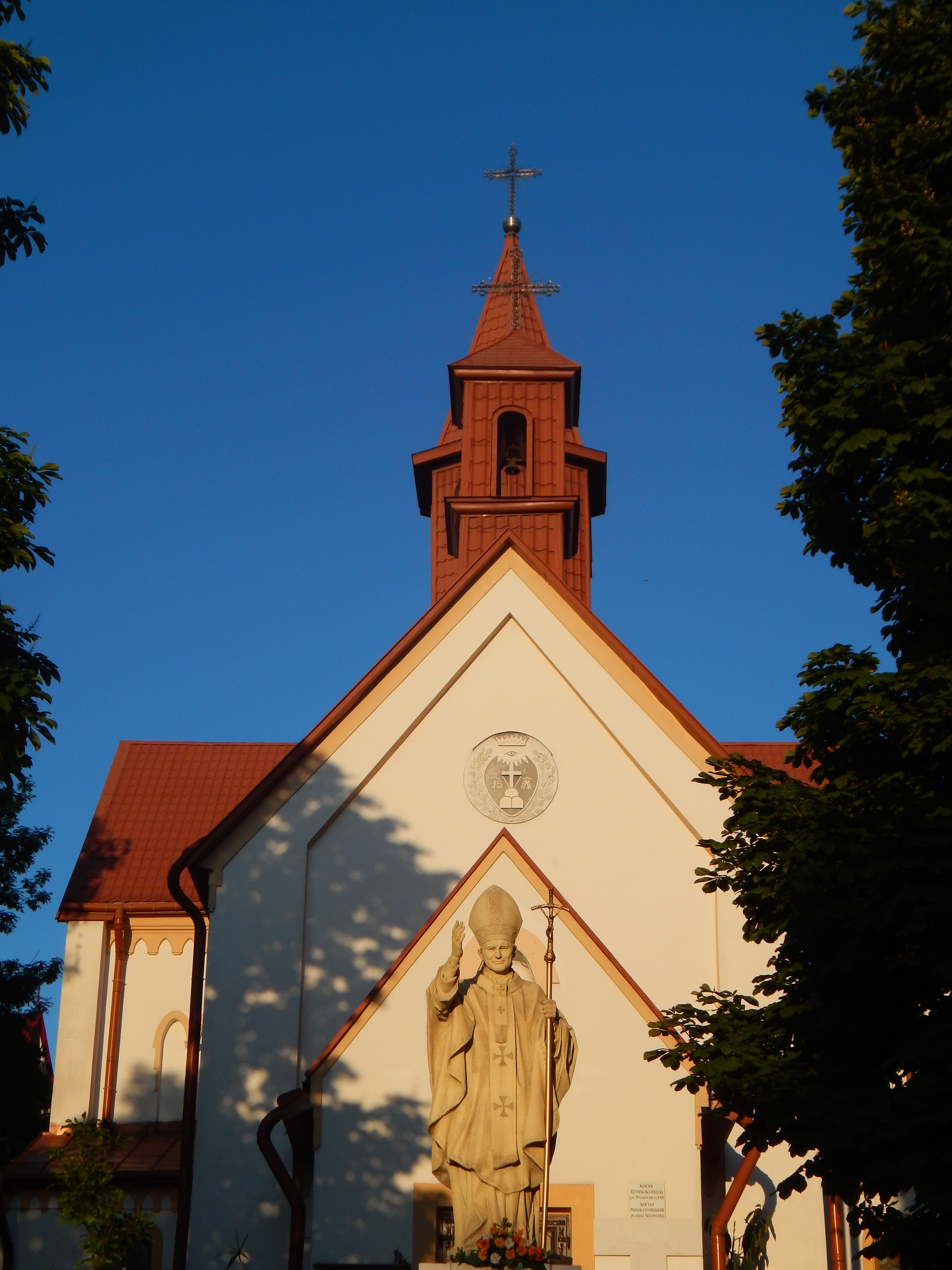
Church of the Assumption and John Paul II statue

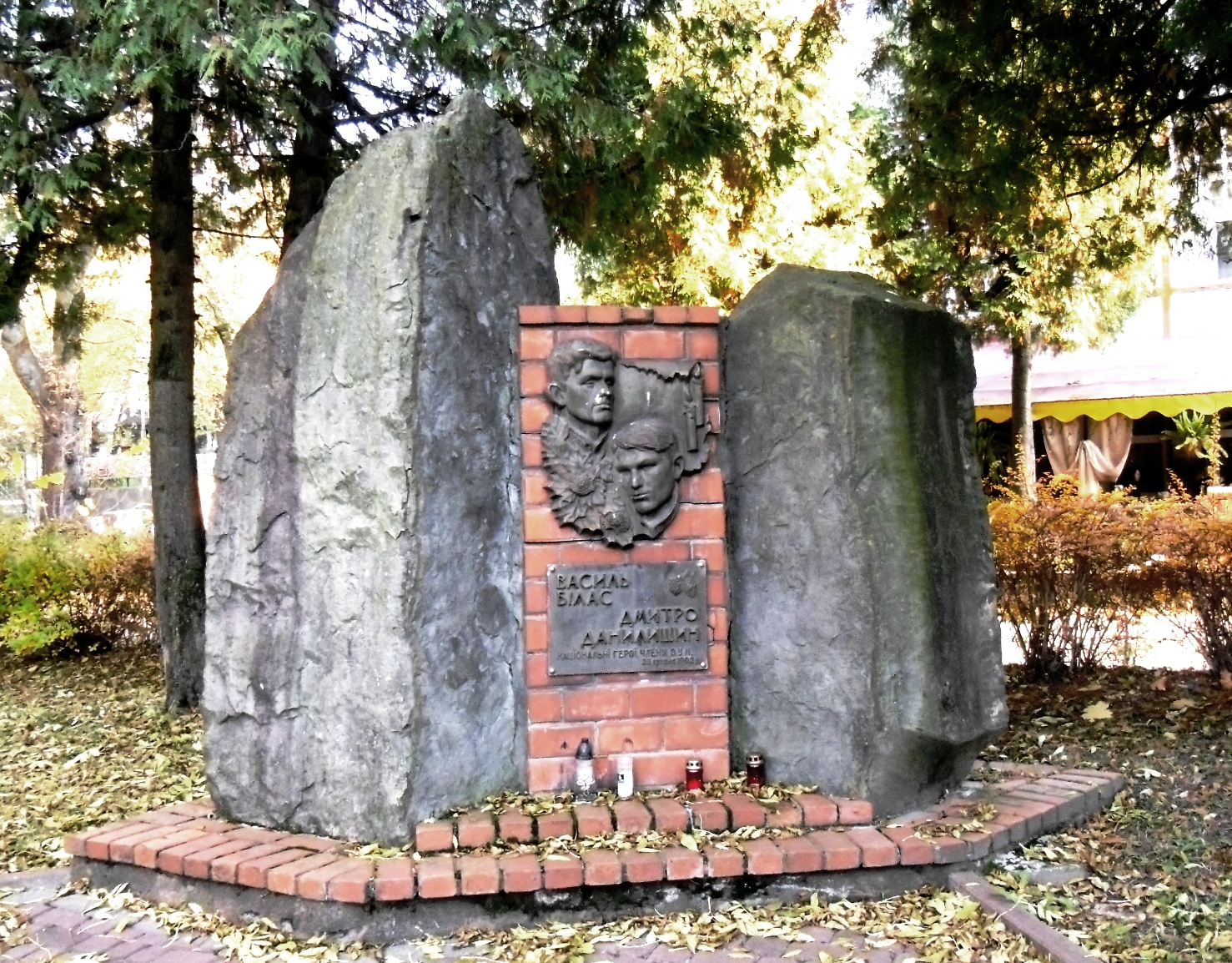
Monument to Vasyl Bilas and Dmytro Danylyshyn

== Sources ==
- Brian R. Banks (2006). Muse & Messiah: The Life, Imagination & Legacy of Bruno Schulz (1892–1942). Inkermen Press UK. ISBN 0-9551829-6-4. An account of the town and neighborhood including Drohobycz along with its relationship to this author and his friends like other Polish writers such as Zofia Nałkowska and Witkacy.
