= Virnopillia =

Village in Kharkiv Oblast, Ukraine

Virnopillya Вірнопілля
- Village
- Interactive map of Virnopillya
- Location of Virnopillya within Ukraine Virnopillya (Ukraine)
- Coordinates: 49.034444°N 37.125556°E
- Country: Ukraine
- Oblast: Kharkiv Oblast
- District: Izium Raion
- Founded: 1st half of the 18th century

Area
  - Total: 1.279 km^{2} (0.494 sq mi)
- Elevation: 139 m (456 ft)

Population (2001 census)
  - Total: 752
  - Density: 588/km^{2} (1,520/sq mi)
- Time zone: UTC+2 (EET)
  - Summer (DST): UTC+3 (EEST)
- Postal code: 64370
- Area code: +380 5743

Virnopillya (Ukrainian: Вірнопілля; Russian: Вернополье) is a village in Izium Raion (district) in Kharkiv Oblast of eastern Ukraine, at about 100 kilometres (62 mi) southeast by south from the centre of Kharkiv city.

The village came under attack by Russian forces in May 2022, during the Russian invasion of Ukraine.

== Demographics ==
The settlement had 752 inhabitants in 2001, native language distribution as of the Ukrainian Census of 2001:

- Ukrainian: 92.77%
- Russian: 5.94%
- other languages: 1.29%
