= Mshanets =

Village in Lviv Oblast, Ukraine

- Village
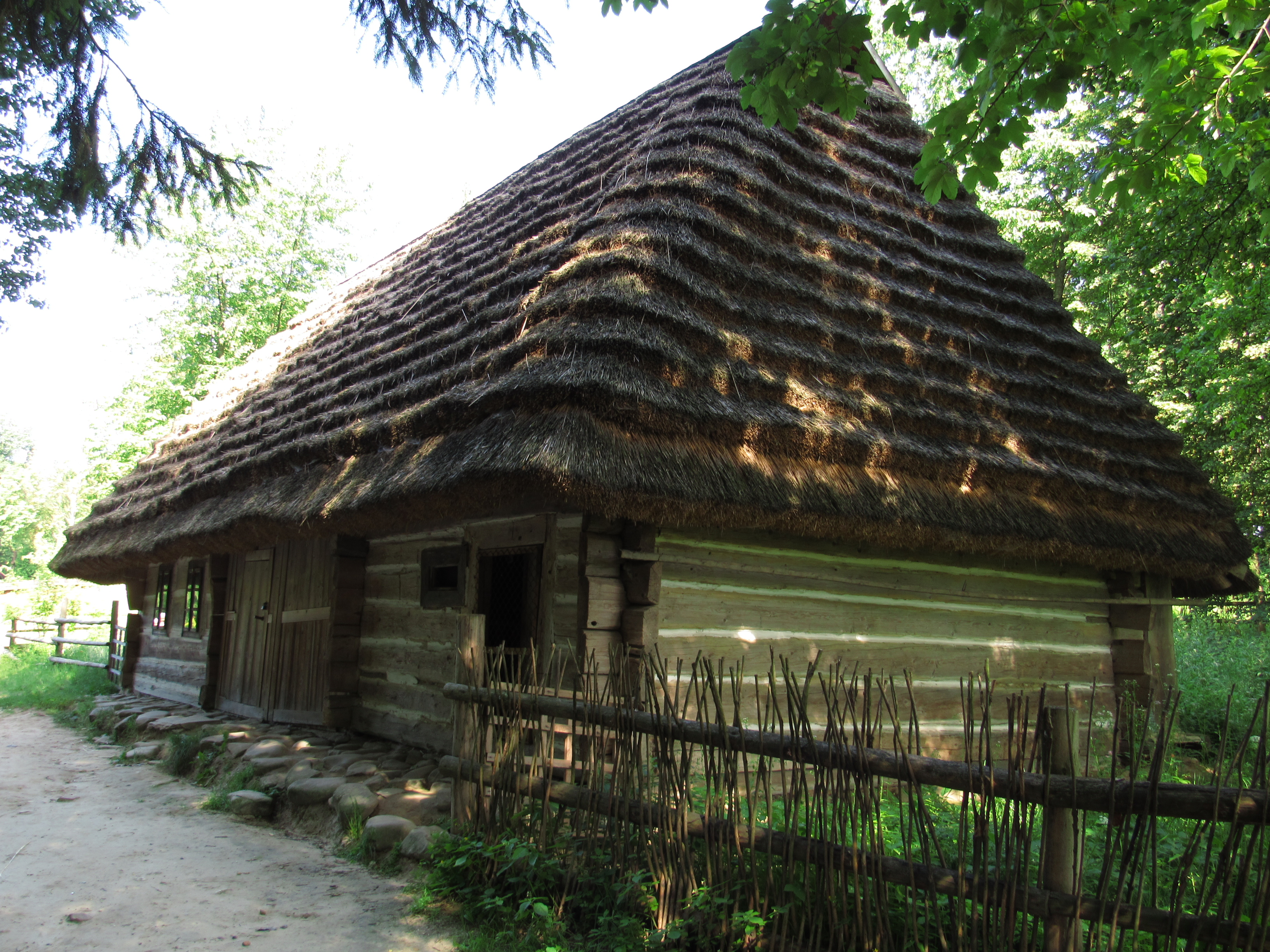
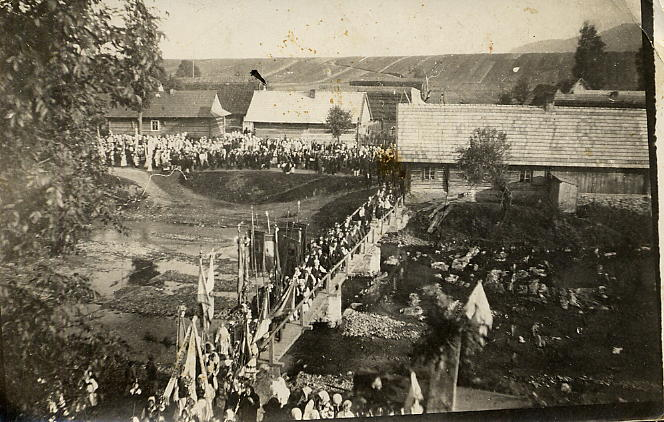
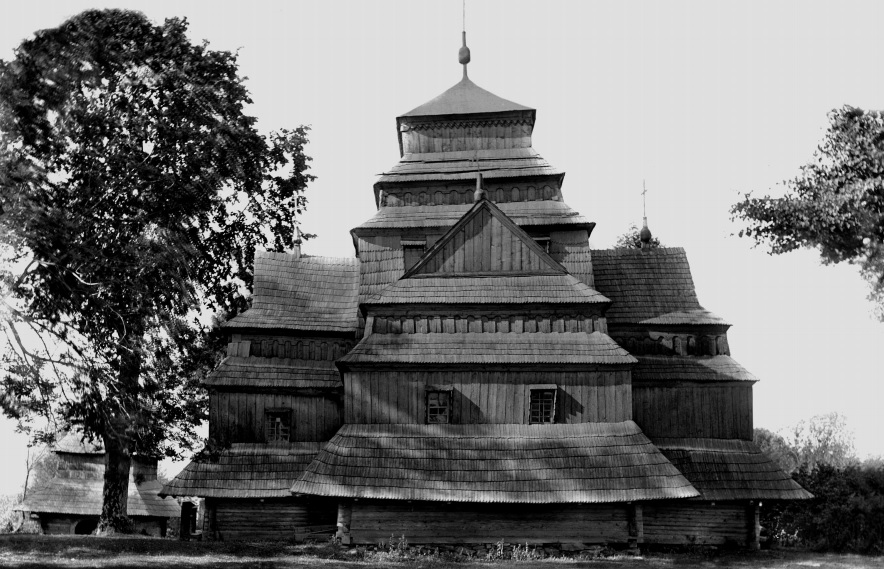

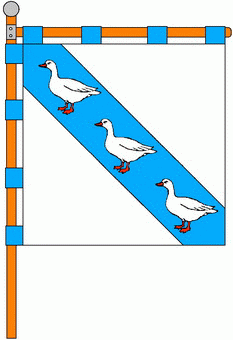
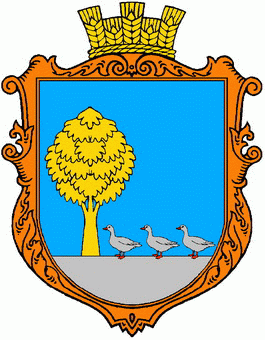
- Flag Coat of arms
- Nickname: Mshanets - the world capital of Boykivshchyna
- Location of Mshanets in Lviv Oblast Mshanets (Ukraine)
- Coordinates: 49°20′13″N 22°46′20″E
- Country: Ukraine
- Oblast: Lviv Oblast
- Raion: Sambir Raion
- Hromada: Strilky rural hromada
- The first preserved written mention: 1446

Government
  - Head of the territorial hromada: Mykola Drozd
  - Starosta: Vasyl Hrytsak

Area
  - Total: 1,568 km^{2} (605 sq mi)
- Elevation: 519 m (1,703 ft)

Population (2023)
  - Total: 140
  - Density: 0.089/km^{2} (0.23/sq mi)
- Time zone: UTC+2 (EET)
  - Summer (DST): UTC+3 (EEST)
- Postal code: 82090
- Area code: +380 3238

Mshanets (Ukrainian: Мшанець) is a village in Ukraine, part of the Strilky rural hromada in the Sambir Raion of the Lviv Oblast. The first preserved written mention of the village dates back to 1446.

This village is the most researched in terms of historical and ethnographic dimensions not only in Ukraine but also in all of Central and Eastern Europe, mainly due to the efforts of Father Mykhailo Zubrytskyi. He served as a village priest of UGCC and community activist from 1883 to 1914, combining his pastoral duties with extensive scholarly work on the history, culture, and lifestyle of the village and the surrounding region. Zubrytskyi engaged prominent figures like Ivan Franko, Volodymyr Hnatiuk, Ilarion Sventsitsky, Khvedir Vovk in these studies, and they visited Mshanets for field research. Historians Mykhailo Hrushevsky and Bohdan Barvinsky also mentioned Mshanets in their works.

== Geography ==
The village is in the Upper-Dniester Beskids (Carpathians), beneath Mount Magura-Limnyanska. It was founded amidst vast forests. O. Mykhailo Zubrytskyj mentioned that "even now branches and rough logs are found in the earth."

"The river Mshanka [the first major tributary of the Dniester] enters the village from the west, originating from Bystre and Mykhnovets (in 1951, stalin transferred these villages to Poland in exchange for Chervonohrad), cuts through two mountains, Magura and Zhukiv, and flows through the village, dividing it into two uneven parts." Neighboring Ukrainian villages include Halivka, Ploske, and Hroziova.

Not far from the village are the National Natural Park "Royal Beskids" and the Regional Landscape Park "Upper-Dniester Beskids."

== History ==
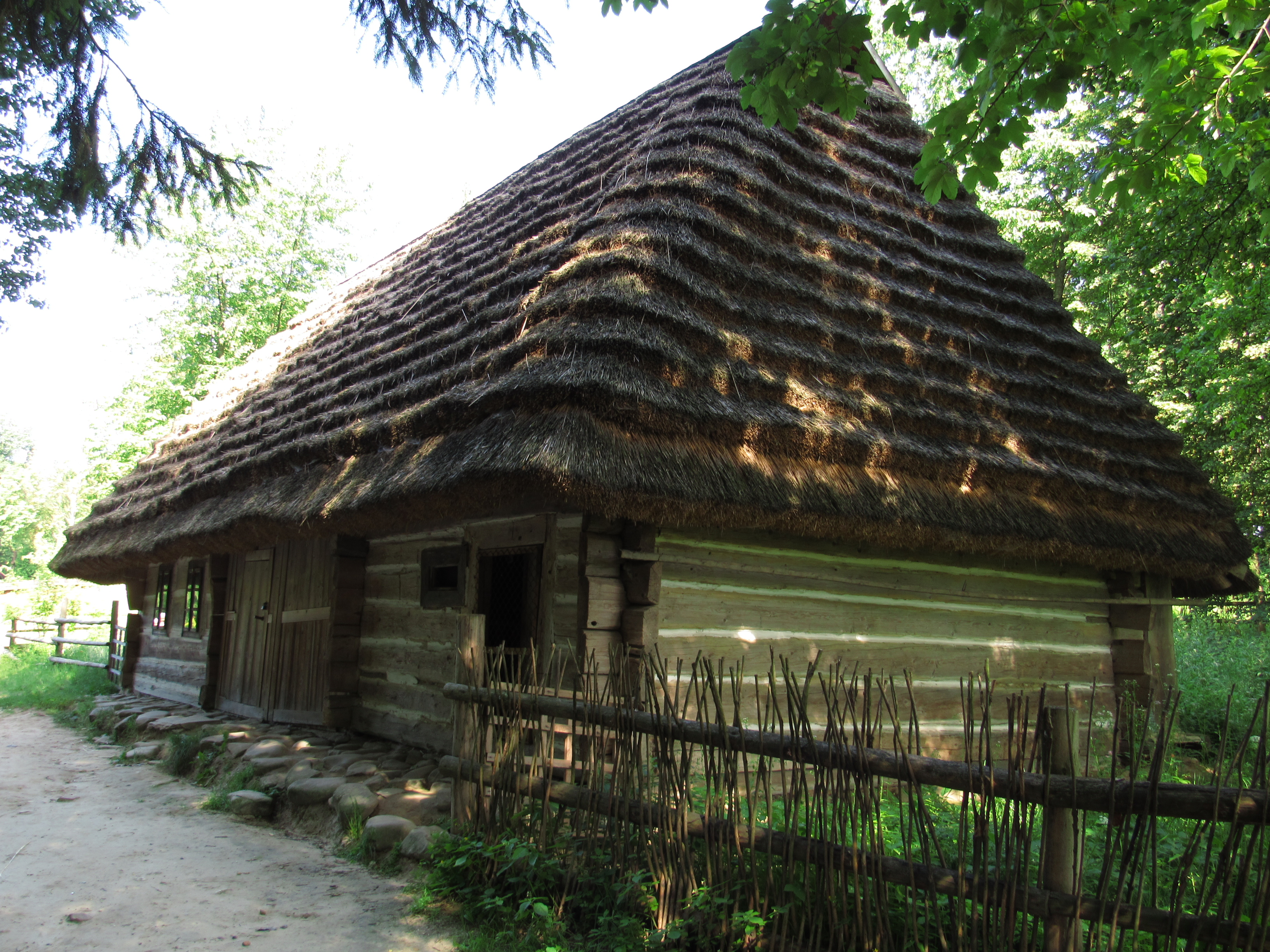
A house from the village of Mshanets

=== Kyivan Rus' and the Kingdom of Galicia–Volhynia ===
It is known about the existence of a Rus' hillfort on Mount Magura Limnyanska (the village itself is located below the mountain) as far back as the 11th-13th centuries.

Data about the ancient period may not have been preserved due to the occupying policies of states that controlled these lands since the decline of Kyivan Rus' and the Kingdom of Galicia–Volhynia. This part of history still needs thorough research, as it is quite likely that it is much older than officially known.

Some experts argue that ancient people appeared in the territory of the Carpathians and the Subcarpathian region during the Mesolithic period (9th-4th millennium BCE).

Volodymyr Kobilnyk, co-founder of the "Boykivschyna" society, while studying the history of settlement in the Carpathians, concluded that during the princely times, there existed an ancient trade route - the Rus' Path - through Staryi Sambir and Turka, and the mountainous part of Boykivschyna was already densely populated "from the 6th to the 13th centuries, and in the 14th century, life here rather declined than developed," due to the Mongol-Tatar invasion.

The fact that life was thriving in the mountains long before the appearance of Poles here was confirmed by the Carpathian Architectural-Archaeological Expedition of the Institute of Social Sciences of the NAS of Ukraine, led by M. Rozhak in 1978-1988.

=== Included within the Polish state (16th century - 1772) ===
Currently, more information has been preserved from the times when these lands were part of the Polish state (they were part of the so-called "Crown lands" or royal estates) and their settlement in the 16th century, mostly at the initiative of Queen Bona, who had one of her residences in Staryi Sambir. However, the first preserved written mention of the village Mshanets dates back to a century before this - in the year 1446.

Fr. Zubrytskyi mentions that he could not find the charter for the founding of the village (he gathered and described documents from peasants dating from 1649 to 1872). However:

In the oldest of the issued descriptions - the lustration of 1564 (M. Hrushevsky, Sources for the History of Ukraine-Rus I, p. 231), Mshanets already appears as an old settlement of the Vlach law, on 20 ancient lans, to which later three more were added, besides the yards of the Schultheiß and the church.

Mykhailo Hrushevsky in 'Pages from the History of the Ukrainian-Ruthenian Rural Clergy' describes a charter from October 15, 1546. 'Queen Bona grants a parish in the village of Mshanets to Ivan, with a note of 10 hryvnias.'

The settlers were attracted by the so-called "Vlach law" (or "shepherd law"), which granted peasants free use of land and pastures, under the authority of community elders, initially called "Knyazes" ("Князі") and later "Vijts" ("Війти") and "Schultheiß" ("Солтиси"). "Each charter for the founding of a village included conditions. Schultheißes were an intermediate class between the nobility and the peasant serf."

Frank Sysyn provides statistical data from 1890 about the inhabitants of the Staryi Sambir and Turka Powiats, which had the highest percentage of Greek Catholics among all Powiats of Galicia. In the Staryi Sambir Powiat, there were 38,764 Ukrainian speakers (77.84% of the total population), and in the Turka Powiat there were 55,507 (88.83%). The ethnographic population of these territories belongs to the "Boykos" ethnic group.

"Indeed, the Polish government, while establishing villages in the mountains based on Vlach law, did not differentiate between the roles of the voivodeship ("війтівство") and the Schultheißship ("солтиство") (advocatia vel scultetia). However, there was a distinction in Mshanets, for which separate charters were issued. In the voivodeship (війтівство), there were nobles from the Stetskovych, Huzelovych, and Petrychkovych families, as well as the immigrant Pole Yankivskyi, while in the soltys (солтиство), there were Voloshchak, Dorosh, Butrym, and Dytzman."

Over time, Vijts and Schultheißes assimilated into the Polish nobility from a legal perspective. The lands granted for their maintenance were eventually distributed by the Crown into ownership of various lords, who introduced a form of serfdom previously unknown in the region. However, these territories never experienced large magnate landowners or significant landownership, which fundamentally distinguishes this region from Podillya. Unlike the rest of Galicia, there were few Poles here, and the local minor nobility barely experienced colonization influences, and the absolute majority of the inhabitants spoke the Boyko dialect of the Ukrainian language and belonged to the Greek Catholic Church.

In Mshanets, there were three Lans in the voivodeship, one of which was called "Lan," from where its name originated. The land there was the best because everything was situated on a fairly spacious plain above the river. Even now, people envy the Lanians and say: "There is nothing like what the Lanians have!"

The second Lan extended along both sides of the church towards the boundaries of Bandriv and Hroziova, while the third Lan was located in Zavadka. In addition to those three, there was also the Schultheißship, and that Lan extended from the upper gristmillalong the mountains of Zhuk and Magura.

The field in Zavadka is not bad; it yields well, but it is difficult to manage because almost everything is spread out on both hillsides. Grain for sowing is often carried on shoulders, it is hard to plow because the plowshares often fall off, and it's also difficult to bring in the harvest.

In Zavadka, the entire voivodeship was settled by the Petrychkovych and Lyzynsky families, while on "Lan," a portion was used by the Stetskovych, previously by the Lypetsky family, and the larger part belonged to the "Sambir treasury."

Below the church, on the voivodeship, lived the Huzelovych, Stetskovych, the Pole Yankivskyi, and the subject Parashchak, nicknamed "Podolyak" by the villagers. At one point, a lord brought a servant with him to the village, gave him a quarter of the voivodeship, and people called him by a higher-sounding name.

The majority of this voivodeship belonged to the castle and passed from hand to hand of various leaseholders, such as Volovskyi, Humnytskyi, Zderkevych, and finally Pyurkovskyi, along with the Lanian field.

Bohdan Barvinskyi mentions an interesting document "Rebellion in the village of Mshanets in 1717" about serfdom relations and an agrarian uprising.

Mshanets during the times of the Polish-Lithuanian Commonwealth belonged to the Lipetsk region in the economy of Sambir land in the Peremyshl region.

In the inventory for the year 1760, it is mentioned that the community complained about Jmp. Piórkowski, the possessor of the voivodeship, who forces them into unusual work, beats them, incorrectly selects tax collectors (karbowników), and dismisses those chosen by Jm. Pan Krajnik. Furthermore, he demands oats from barren land. The same community complained that J. Kr. M. was appropriating land in other villages, such as in Ploske, Bystre, Halivka, and Hrozova. Administration should intervene.

=== Under the rule of the Habsburgs (1772-1914) ===
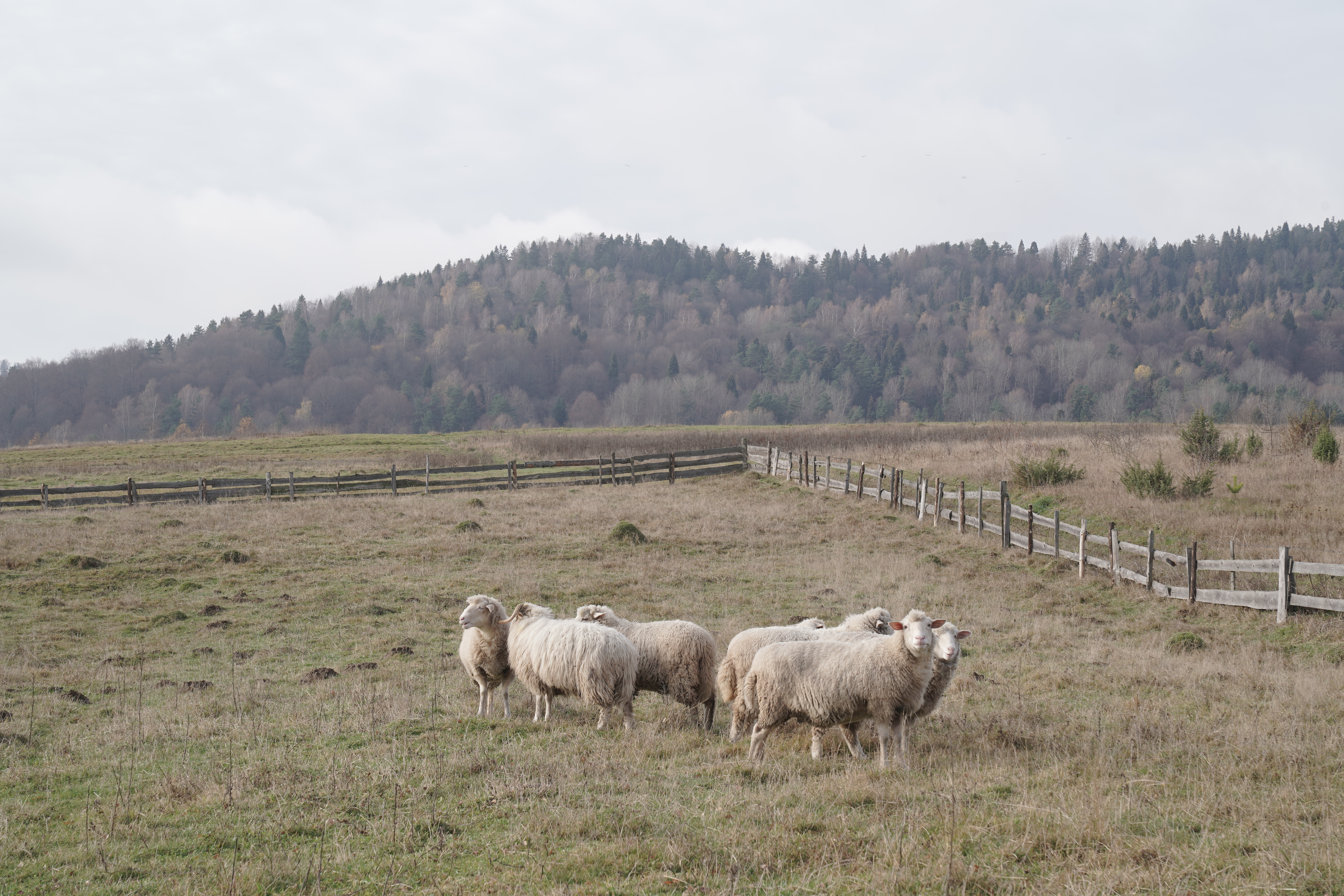
Shepherding. Village Mshanets (Strilky hromada).

After the region's annexation to the Habsburg Empire in 1772, the practice of distributing local lands to ownership decreased, and the village, along with others, came under the administrative management of the Chamber (state administration of royal estates).

In 1782, the Stetskevich family (one of the three branches of the Mshanets voivodeship-princely family of the "Sas" coat of arms; the other two being Guzilovych and Petrachkovych; these families separated at the end of the 16th century) confirmed their nobility in the Przemysl city court. They are descended from Stetsko Medved (1599-1608).

According to the data on the map "Galizien und Lodomerien (1779–1783) - First Military Survey," during this time, there were at least three mills in Mshanets.

The second significant change in the early years of Austrian rule was the introduction of military conscription, which later played an important (though not necessarily positive) role in the development of rural communities. Father Mykhailo Zubrytsky wrote most comprehensively about this in the article "Contributions to the History of Conscription in Galicia from the End of the 18th Century to the Mid-19th Century." At the same time, Emperor Joseph II's colonization policy led to significant demographic changes. An important factor here was the establishment of a German colony in Bandriv near Mshanets, where settlers from the Rhine River areas, Lutherans by denomination, settled. Ivan Franko mentions and describes their way of building houses, farming practices, etc., in the article "Ethnographic Expedition to Boykivshchyna."

Significant fundamental changes occurred only at the end of the 19th century. They affected daily life, livelihoods, and even more profoundly, the worldview of people. These changes can be considered a crisis of the old culture and the beginning of modernization.

From the perspective of economic modernization, Mshanets and the surrounding villages were integrated into the global capitalist system in a dual manner: through the exploitation of local natural resources (forests, and later oil - agricultural production had little significance for the economy) and the incorporation of the local population into the global market for industrial labor. Around 1900, mass emigration to the United States, Canada, and later France began, mainly due to the educational activities of Father Mykhailo Zubrytsky, who conducted lectures for peasants on the geography, economics, and other countries, and acquired a globe for the Prosvita reading room he founded. This significant bilateral movement of people, especially the young, continued until 1939.

The ideological modernization - the penetration of new ideas, particularly modern national identity - gained momentum at around the same time. The first awakening figure in the region was the peasant from Hroziv village, Vasyl Sygin, a colorful personality known among the people as "Syhin-Monakh" (Syhin the Monk). Sometime in the 1870s, he visited the Pochaiv Lavra and returned with a pile of books in Church Slavonic and Russian languages, as well as with spiritual enlightenment, which official authorities did not recognize, as the Russian Empire was considered a hostile state.

Syhin-Monakh was the first to start teaching children Church Slavonic literacy because until then, the population was illiterate.

==== The taxation system ====
The government did not tax individual people, but rather imposed a tax on all 18 plots of land, and then divided it among the residents of the village based on their holdings. The tax collectors, chosen by the community, collected the taxes in an original manner: using a stick with four sides. On one side, the number of plots of land owned by each landowner from the lower end of the village, starting from the "Lan", was marked. If someone besides the land had additional "ells", these were marked on the opposite side of the stick relative to the plots. When a landowner brought the tax, or when the tax collectors went to their homes, they looked at the stick to see how many plots of land the landowner had. Based on this, they calculated the amount of tax.

Traditionally, the Vijts and Schultheißes obliged to pay a special tax for the benefit of the Latin parish priest in Sambir, known as "meshne".

The "meshne" tax was collected by the old Sambir district as late as 1871, even though there were no longer any Vijts or Schultheißes in the village. In 1885 or 1886, a directive came to the vijt to collect the "meshne" from those obligated to pay it. The vijt and the scribe consulted with me on what to do, and I asked them if they knew who the Schultheißes were and how they could distinguish them from other landowners. They replied that they didn't know who the Schultheißes in the village, and there was no one from whom to collect the "meshne," as the district should know them individually and present them to the village elders for recognition. After that, nothing further came to the village for "meshne."

==== The system of community court ====
The community court system involved a jury, later - the mayor and the people. Cases rarely reached higher instances. The most important feature was that anyone willing to participate could attend the court. Later, in the second half of the 19th century, a system was formed where the mayor, with the help of a sworn jury (community policeman), convened "councilors." However, even in this case, the judicial system remained open, as those who were not part of the "councilors" could participate and, most importantly, influence the decisions. If someone delayed the court, they would take the case "to the people." For example, if one landowner accused another of some dishonest deed, the offended party would complain to the mayor, who would then summon the people through the sworn jury (community policeman).

When people gathered, the accused would take out 5 Rhenish guldens, 10, or 20, place them on the table, and say, "Let my five (ten, twenty) be lost if it turns out that the accusation against me is true!" The accuser was obliged to prove his accusation. If he proved it, the money laid out would be lost, but if he couldn't prove it, then he paid the same amount that the accused had placed on the table.

These money probably went for liquor, and those were the famous treats we often read about in this collection. After the trial, the bailiff would say to the offender, "Apologize to the people!" And he would buy liquor and treat everyone. It was like this in the village until recently.

When there are no witnesses and both sides stick to their stories, then the bailiff would say, "Will you take an oath?" or "Will you hit yourself in the chest, swearing that what you say is true?" If the accused agrees to take the oath or hits himself in the chest, then he is acquitted.

The "Kraynik" usually approved the judgments issued in the community, or ordered the community to adjudicate. Sometimes, he instructed jurors or bailiffs from other communities to come to Mshanets and adjudicate disputes.

One farmer recounted that where he currently farms, there used to be a wooden mare onto which people were made to sit as punishment. That mare is no longer there, but the farmer heard about it from his grandmother, who passed away in 1879 at the age of 86. Her grandfather, Lesyo Vataschak, was a juror in Mshanets and he was responsible for making offenders sit on that wooden mare.

=== The era of Father Zubrytsky (1883-1914) ===
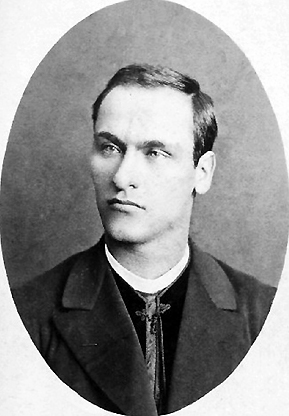
Father Mykhailo Zubrytskyi, the parish priest of the village of Mshanets, was a Greek-Catholic priest.

During the years 1883-1914, the village was under the pastoral care of the distinguished scholar and priest, Father Mykhailo Zubrytskyi. Alongside studying various aspects of the daily life, spiritual, and material culture of the Boykos, he worked to improve the political, legal, economic, and educational-cultural status of the peasants, including establishing a school with Ukrainian-language instruction and a "Prosvita" reading room, organizing a cooperative, and reducing alcoholism in taverns.

Mykhailo sought to introduce more advanced forms of farming in the region, including rational land cultivation systems and crop rotation, better breeds of cattle and horses, cooperative trade, and new crafts. He also worked to explain current legislation to the peasants, and wrote appeals, requests, and protests, to help them avoid unjust punishment.

Zubrytskyi succeeded in opening the "Prosvita" reading room in Mshanets on February 28, 1892, and actively engaged in various activities there. He also worked to improve education in other mountainous villages. He fought against alcoholism, becoming an "enemy" to many, but practically sobered up the village.

Zubrytskyi transformed Mshanets into the first "conscious" Ukrainian village in the vicinity. Other villages achieved such a level of awareness later, during the Polish rule.

He led an active anti-alcohol campaign, effectively sobering up the village, thus earning himself enemies – local Jewish tavern keepers.

In 1894, Zubrytskyi observed that people had stopped selling their fields (on the contrary, those who had means tried to buy more), stopped drinking excessively during caroling and socializing as before, limited the number of godparents to only 2-4 (previously, up to twenty were invited to church, and apparently, everyone was treated to alcohol), and at dinners, weddings, and funerals, half as much alcohol was consumed as before.

In 1897, Zubrytskyi proudly boasted that in Mshanets, 500 participants from nearby villages across three districts gathered for political and social agitation. Moreover, the village was the first in the Staryi Sambir district to adopt Ukrainian as the language of communication with the district authorities.

Thanks to the efforts of the parish priest, in the 1920s and 1930s, the "Sich" society gained a strong foothold in Mshanets. Active members included Kyrylo Piznak (father of the repressed artist from Mshanets, Hryhoriy Piznak), his brother Fedir, and Hryhoriy Grytsuna. During this time, the disciples of Father Mykhailo, their children, and grandchildren almost unanimously shared the ideas of the Ukrainian Military Organization (UVO) and the Organization of Ukrainian Nationalists (OUN) throughout the village.

==== The "Prosvita" Reading Room in Mshanets ====
On February 28, 1892, the "Prosvita" reading room was solemnly opened in Mshanets, initially located free of charge in the "izba" (shop) of Omelyan Demyanovsky, a neighbor of Father Mykhailo.

After 15 years, in 1907, the construction of the People's House was completed, and the Reading Room was moved there. Members of the reading room gathered on Sundays and holidays in the evenings, as well as on Saturday evenings and before holidays, to read books and magazines (often news or articles were read to them by Father Zubrytskyi or later his younger son Petro Zubrytskyi), and then discuss various current public affairs, sing religious and secular songs. Single people often visited on weekdays, borrowing and returning books.

Opening the reading room was not easy, as the villagers were deliberately intimidated by high membership fees and similar falsehoods. The founders were 35 men who contributed 50 crowns each (together they received 14 Rhenish gulden coins and 50 crowns). The following year, another 20 men joined, but the membership fee was reduced to 30 crowns. Only 43 out of 55 paid the membership fee, so the reading room had an income of 12 Rhenish gulden coins and 40 crowns in the second year.

The main expenses over the two years went towards subscriptions to magazines ("Batʹkivshchyna", "Chytalʹnia", "Dobri radi", "Biblioteka dlia molodi" from Chernivtsi, "Poslanets") and the purchase of books ("Misiini knyzhochky"), as well as two calendars from "Poslanets" and a map of Rus-Ukraine.

Until 1910, the number of official members hardly increased, but non-members had free access to the reading room. The report for 1910 is the last one preserved in the archive of the central department of "Prosvita", which indicated the number of members - 103 men, including 73 literate and 28 illiterate.

There was also a map of Rus-Ukraine in the reading room, and in 1989, Father Zubrytskyi purchased a globe for visual explanation of the geographical position of different countries and economic relations.

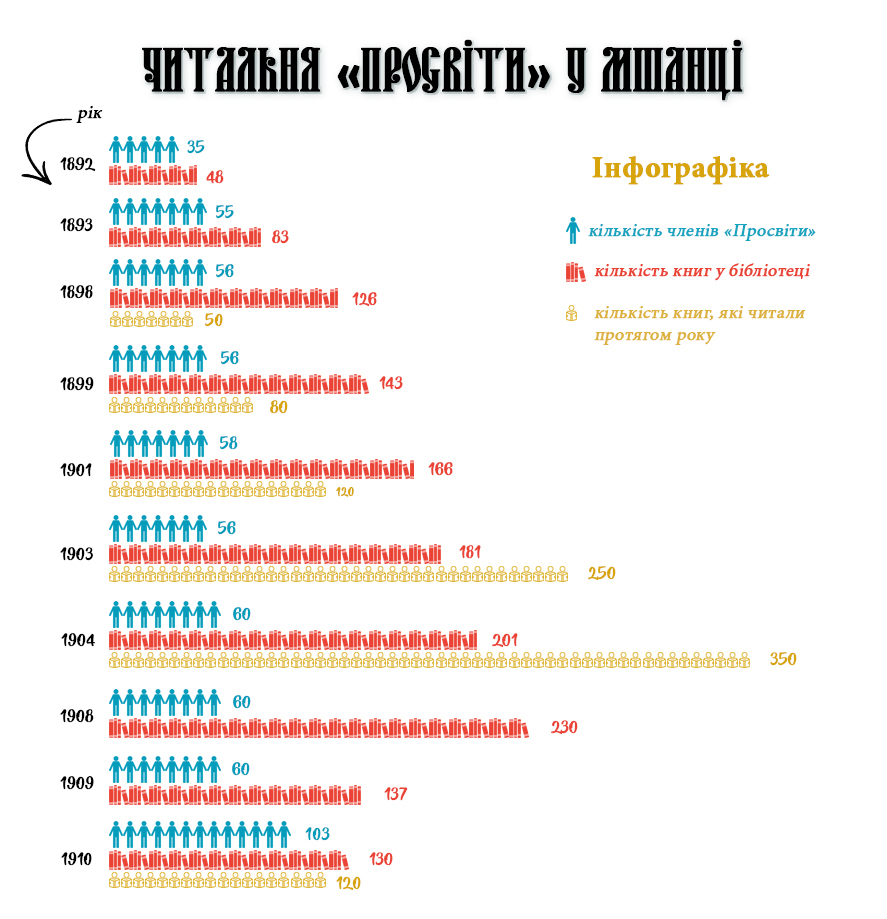
Infographic about the 'Prosvita' Reading Room in the village of Mshanets.

The most popular books were "Bohdan Khmelnytsky", "Abraham Lincoln", "Old Rus' Tales", "Image of Honor", "Brazilian Harmony", "Superstitions and Sorcery", "Kobzar", "Talmud", "Robinson Crusoe", "Rus' Reader", "Our Misfortune", and many others. From the founding until 1908, the number of books in the village library steadily increased from 48 to 230 copies. However, the reports for 1909 and 1910 show a smaller number - 137 and 130 respectively. It is unclear why this happened. The highest borrowing activity occurred in 1904 - with 350 books borrowed.

During the first two years, "Prosvita" members contributed membership fees for the purchase of literature, but later all book and newspaper products were bought from the profits of the cooperative shop operated by "Prosvita".

Later, the community built a separate building for the reading room across the river from the church, where today the Museum named after Father Mykhailo Zubrytskyi is located. According to local residents, Father Zubrytskyi, along with Ivan Franko, laid the foundation of the building.

There are mentions by local residents of the theater group in Mshanets in the 20th century, which staged performances both in the local "Prosvita" building and in neighboring villages.

==== "Ruska Kramnytsia" (Community Store at "Prosvita") ====
Founded on April 4, 1892, the "Ruska Kramnytsia" (Ruthenian Store) was located in the house of the host Omelyan Demianovsky, managed by his son Alexander. Thanks to his efforts and dedication, the store's turnover doubled in just the first year (he took a minimal salary of 10 Rhenish gulden for his work).

It all started when 16 members contributed 5 Rhenish gulden each, which was used to purchase necessary goods in the village: leather for harnesses, oil, lubricants, sugar, pepper, soap, and school supplies. The Imperial-Royal County Office in Stare Misto (Stary Sambir) provided the store with a trade card for selling mixed goods such as salt and oil.

In the first year, the members did not take any profit but reinvested it for the next year. In 1893, another 20 new people joined the store: seven contributed 10 Rhenish gulden each, and thirteen contributed 5 Rhenish gulden each. Thus, the total membership in the second year was 295 Rhenish gulden.

The assortment expanded to include iron goods such as axes, chisels, drills, axes, pliers, awls, needles, and scissors purchased from the Viennese firm M. Ortony et Comp., Swiss scarves from the Viennese firm Carl Nachmas, and fabric from Lorenz a Dicht in Czechia. They also increased purchases from "Narodna Torhivlia" (People's Trade) in Sambir.

Additionally, the Imperial-Royal County Treasury Directorate in Sambir granted a tobacco license in the name of the head of the reading room, with Alexander Demianovsky as deputy. The annual fee for the license was 2 Rhenish gulden 50 crowns.

The store became a challenge for local Jews who imposed high markups on various goods and sold them illegally without industrial cards or authorization to sell tobacco.

By 1894, Father Zubrytsky noted that local people did not fully understand the "importance of lucrativeness," and some even envied that their fellow villagers could earn money like them. This hindered the store's development.

As of April 1, 1894:

- 1,291 Rhenish gulden 87 crowns were spent on purchasing goods.
- 1,208 Rhenish gulden 47 crowns were sold during the year.
- 29 Rhenish gulden 28 crowns were owed to the village.
- Expenses for shipping, letters, and payment to the manager amounted to 89 Rhenish gulden 24 crowns.
- The inventory of goods was valued at 320 Rhenish gulden 78 crowns.
- Cash and debts totaled 106 Rhenish gulden 57 crowns.
- After deducting the 295 Rhenish gulden contributed by members and paying 23 Rhenish gulden 20 crowns to the manager, the remaining balance of 109 Rhenish gulden 15 crowns was "to be divided among the members of the store."

==== The first comprehensive scientific expedition of Ukrainian ethnographers in the Boyko region (1904) ====
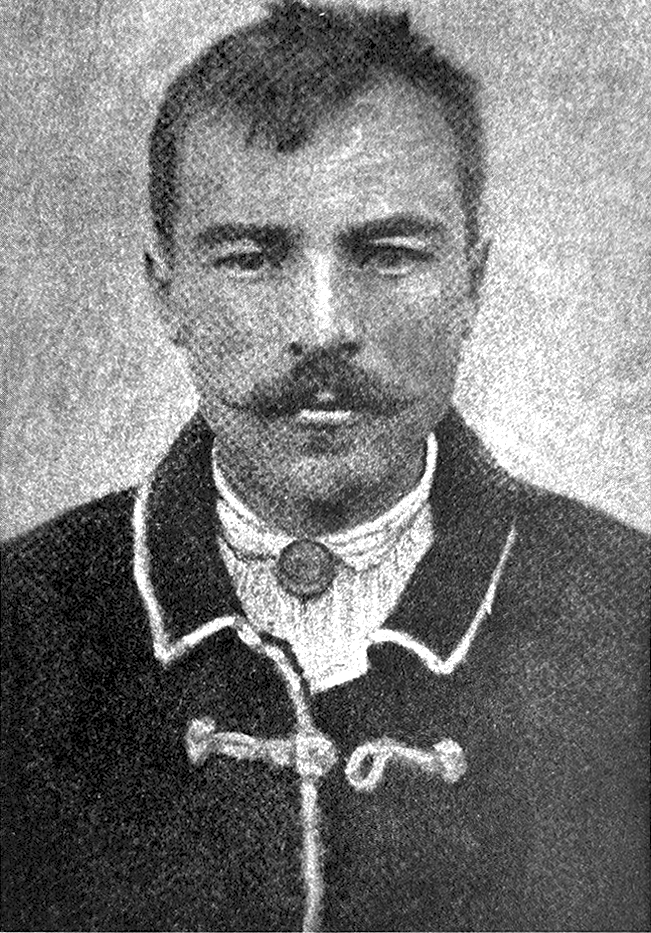
A young man from Mshanets in a lejbyk (jacket) with sleeves.

In 1904, the first comprehensive scientific expedition of Ukrainian ethnographers began in Mshanets, led by Dr. Ivan Franko, Professor Fedor Vovk from Paris, and Zenon Kuzel, a student at the University of Vienna. They spent 10 days in the village, photographing and collecting ethnographic material. The initiator of the expedition was the Austrian professor and curator of the ethnographic-anthropological department of the Museum of Natural History (Naturhistorischen Museum), Michael Haberlandt, who allocated 400 crowns to cover travel expenses and the purchase of exhibits for the museum.

Especially for this expedition, the participants purchased in Vienna "a small but good photographic apparatus with a Goertz lens of the latest edition, which then served us very well on the road." During the expedition, anthropological measurements were first taken of Father Zubrytsky's family to show the villagers that it was not dangerous and quite respectable. They also measured Ivan Franko himself. In 1905, in the German-language journal "Zeitschrift für österreichische Volkskunde" (Volume I-II, Issue I-II, Vienna, 1905, pp. 17–32; III-IV, pp. 98–115), Ivan Franko presented a report on this expedition in an article titled "Ethnographic Expedition to Boykivshchyna."

The route was determined as follows: our starting point was the small railway station Ustryki on the Przemyśl-Lupków railway line, from where we traveled to the remote village of Mshanets (locally known as Pshenets) situated 20 km away. There, we received a warm welcome, intellectual and active assistance, and support from the Ukrainian priest Mykhailo Zubrytskyi – a prominent Ukrainian historian and ethnographer, a full member of the Shevchenko Scientific Society, and a knowledgeable expert on the western mountainous Boykivshchyna (himself of Boyko origin). We stayed there for 10 days. It turned out that choosing Mshanets as the first stop of our expedition was very fortunate because this village is exceptionally advantageous – both due to the preservation of ancient features in culture and way of life, and also because of its very lively trading connections with the Hutsuls to the east and the Lemkos to the west (especially in trading live sheep); it serves as a bridge between these two ethnographic groups of the Ukrainian people, which also left its mark on the local culture. Here, the main collection of Boyko items was also gathered, which now belongs to the Austrian Museum of Ethnography and will be described in more detail below.

As recalled by his son Petro Zubrytskyi in 1968, "The people of Mshanets were unable to properly appreciate my Father's efforts for their spiritual and physical upliftment. They only realized who He was to them just 2-3 years after His departure from Mshanets. The old evangelical thesis was confirmed (it seems, not for the last time) on my Father: 'A prophet is not without honor except in his own country!'"

==== Field ethnographic research and visits by scholars ====
Several times, the secretary of the Shevchenko Scientific Society (NTSh) and renowned folklorist Volodymyr Hnatiuk visited Mshanets, personally invited by Father Zubrytskyi. Father Zubrytskyi motivated his invitation by stating that as a spiritual figure, the villagers felt ashamed to recount "vulgar stories" to him.

In the spring of 1913, Mykhailo Zubrytskyi purchased 78 items in the Boykivshchyna region—tools for processing flax, hemp, and weaving canvas—and donated them to the Shevchenko Scientific Society Museum in Lviv ("Chronicle of NTSh" part 55).

The director of the National Museum in Lviv, Ilarion Sventsitsky, also visited Mshanets and took some old icons from the church to the museum.

=== World War I (1914-1917) and the first liberation struggles (1917-1920) ===
World War I dealt heavy blows to the traditional rural community and culture. The adult male population of the surrounding villages was fully mobilized into the Austrian army (where they were mostly used as cannon fodder, first on the Serbian, then on the Italian fronts). Instead, Mshanets provided a whole series of volunteers for the formation of the Ukrainian Sich Riflemen.

The villages themselves (mostly women, children, and elderly people) after the terrible battles on Magura Limnianska found themselves under Russian occupation, with Don Cossacks and units of the renowned 'Wild Division' of Caucasian mountaineers stationed in them for almost half a year. The end of the war brought about the downfall of the traditional monarchic rule.

In the 'Lopushansky Archive,' permit No. 273556 dated November 10, 1916, was found for the opening of economic mills, including the partnership of Mendel Wolf & Perl Hirthali in Mshanets.

In the Polish-Ukrainian War for Galicia (1918-1919), the surrounding villages were generally passive, except for Mshanets, which again provided volunteers for the national cause.

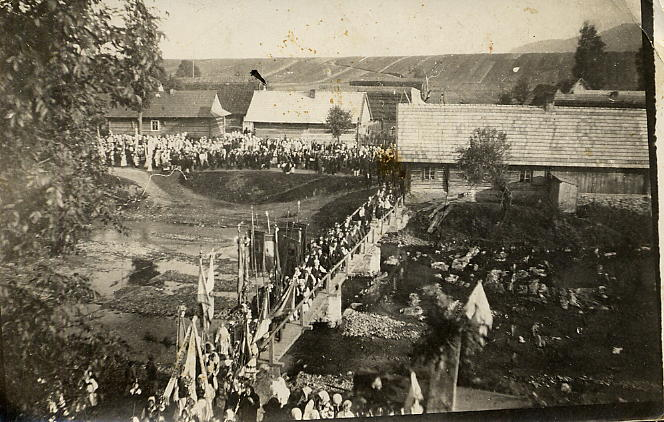
Mshanets village, 1928.

=== Under Polish rule (1920-1939) ===
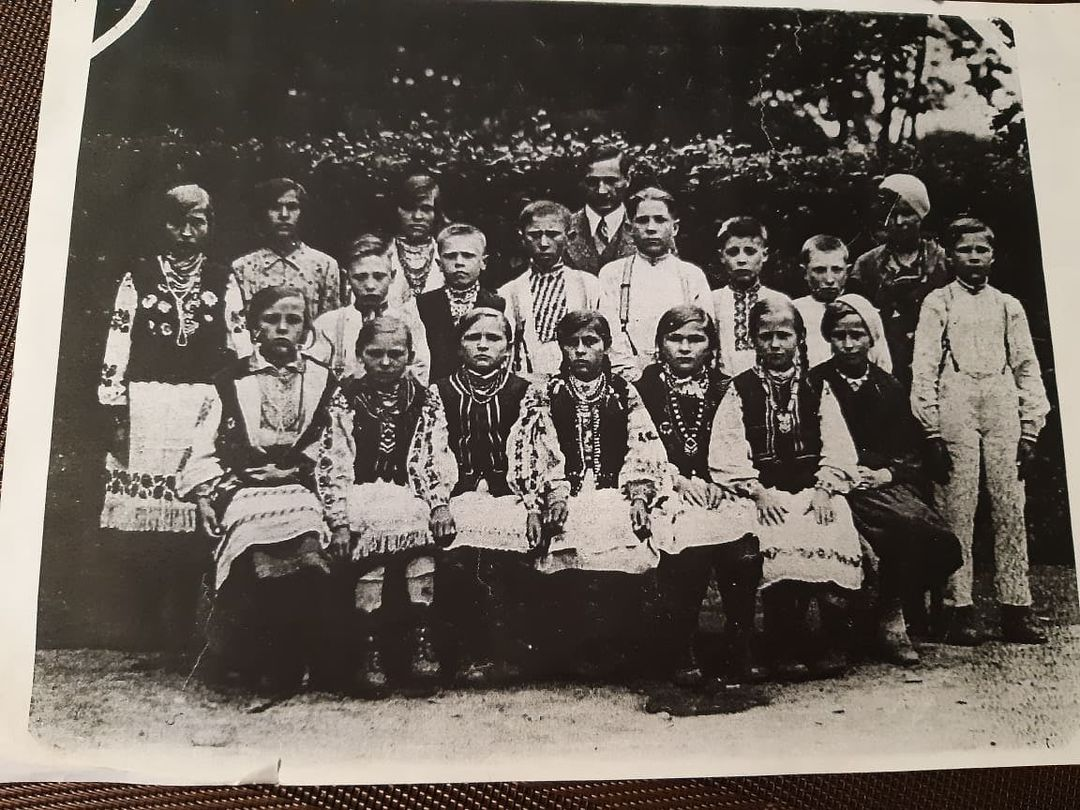
Schoolchildren of the village Mshanets in the 1930s.

The Polish rule somewhat accelerated economic modernization (especially the development of the oil industry), although it did not bring about fundamental changes in life and everyday existence. Instead, it completed the process of forming modern Ukrainian identity, paradoxical as it may sound. The national question was decisively raised; even the 'darkest' (in Galician terminology) peasant felt that he did not belong to the Polish nation.

Furthermore, Poland developed the school system, and the youth became almost entirely literate. Schools were tasked with instilling identification with the Polish nation or, at the very least, loyalty to the Polish state, but in practice, they worked in the opposite direction.

Second, closely related to the first, a significant change under Polish rule was the politicization of the population, especially the youth. Speaking specifically about Mshanets, the process began even under Father Zubrytsky, who played a crucial role in it. However, widespread political activity (largely due to the influence of Mshanets) in the surrounding areas developed in the 1920s.

Andriy Voloshchak, a student of Fr. Zubrytsky, a law student, was wounded in the first battle of the First World War and blinded. Despite this, he obtained a second higher education, earning a living as a poet and writer. But not only that: he became enthralled with the ideas of communism, which he spread among the youth of Mshanets and among the students of the Peremyshl Gymnasium, where he taught and where boys from surrounding villages studied. Thanks to his authority in Mshanets, a strong communist organization was formed there. In other villages, there were fewer communists, and the main activists among them were people who became converted to communism while working in France and Canada. The Western Ukrainian communists of that time had a distinct "national" orientation, seeing the Soviet Ukraine as the fulfillment of the national aspirations of the Ukrainian people.

The Soviet Encyclopedia "History of Towns and Villages of the Ukrainian SSR" for 1968 indicates: "In the 1930s, there was an underground center of the Communist Party of Western Ukraine (CPWU) in the village, whose members studied Marxist literature and distributed publications of the CPWU among the peasants."

In 1933, a large fire occurred in the village, which destroyed 35 households. It is likely that the fire also affected the building of the "Prosvita" reading room and the "Ruska Kramnytsia" (Community Store at "Prosvita"), for the reconstruction of which funds were collected from the Mshanets diaspora in the USA.

In 1937, in the village of Mshanets, there were the Saint Missions conducted by the Redemptorist monks Father Van de Male and Blessed Father Zynoviy Kovalyk. At that time, the village belonged to the Zhukotyn deanery of the Peremyshl Eparchy.

The population, imbued with communist views, stopped attending the church. Only 140 out of 1300 residents approached for confession before Easter. However, the mission, which lasted from September 27 to October 7, was successful. During this time, 2400 Holy Communions (Eucharist) were distributed, and 150 people enrolled in the newly established Brotherhood of Our Lady of Perpetual Help.

Although communism was the first organized political movement in these areas, over time it was overshadowed by another powerful political force with revolutionary and totalitarian inclinations - the OUN (Organization of Ukrainian Nationalists). The influence of the OUN penetrated primarily through the youth: activists were the sons of appointed priests from surrounding villages or local boys who studied in gymnasiums and other educational institutions in Galicia. As is known, nationalism gained almost complete control over the worldview of Ukrainian students in the 1930s. Here, the OUN focused on propaganda and the creation of underground structures capable of organized actions. It is worth noting that villages did not provide much space for revolutionary practice for either nationalists or communists, so both expected significant changes from outside.

=== World War II (1939-1945) and the second liberation struggles (1944-1950s) ===
The year 1939 marked the beginning of a catastrophic decade during which the foundations of traditional culture were destroyed. During this period, minorities that had long inhabited the villages disappeared, leaving behind a monolithically Ukrainian population. The advent of Soviet rule brought about enthusiasm among communists, but non-communists also greeted it with hopes for possible changes on economic and national fronts.

Local communists became heads of village councils and kolkhozes, under the supervision of numerous incoming party cadres - military personnel, security officials, teachers, and others, mainly from Central and Eastern Ukraine, which were part of the Ukrainian Soviet Socialist Republic at that time. The dekulakization and repression, which dealt a terrible blow to the rural elite, sparked a rise in radical anti-Soviet sentiments among a significant portion of the population.

In 1940, according to the agreement between the Soviet Union and the Third Reich, the large German colony in Bandriv disappeared in a single day. Its residents were resettled to the western Polish territories annexed by Germany (although they stayed there briefly, only until 1945).

During the German advance in June 1941, there were cases of vigilantism by local peasants against communists. The Romani people suffered greatly as well. Local Jews were later organized and deported by order of the Germans. It is worth noting that there were no spontaneous anti-Jewish actions here at the beginning of the war, as in cities. In urban areas, Jews became victims of fatal collaboration between them and the communist regime, whereas in villages, all communists were seen as "their own" by the Ukrainian population.

Soviet institutions dissolved, and those wealthy farmers who were spared Soviet repression took control over the villages. The German occupation policy was relatively lenient towards Galician Ukrainians, and the biggest burden for the surrounding villages was the provision of labor contingents for the agriculture and industry of the Reich.

In terms of politics, the OUN predominated, although it was divided at the time: in Mykhnovets, there was a strong Melnyk organization, while in Mshanets, there was a Bandera organization. The Melnykite pursued a policy of infiltration into public institutions, whereas the Banderite faction emphasized underground activities, including the establishment of Ukrainian Insurgent Army (UPA) formations.

In the 1940s and 1950s, one of the most influential centers of the Organization of Ukrainian Nationalists (OUN), headed by Stepan Bandera, operated in Mshanets. When the Ukrainian Insurgent Army (UPA) emerged, many residents of Mshanets joined its ranks. At least 60 of them perished in the struggle against Polish, German, and Russian occupiers. The most information is available about the UPA commander Mykhailo Dylin, known as "Kosarenko." Residents of Hroziova and other villages in this region also fought heroically and en masse.

With the approach of Soviet forces in 1944, the emigration of families of repressed individuals and Melnykite activists began. Local members of the Banderaite received orders from their organization to resist the Soviet advance. Thus began several years of insurgent struggle. A significant portion of the local youth sacrificed their lives in this fight. Many rural families were evacuated. The local population, which had suffered severe trauma, was incorporated into the Soviet system.

Levko Parashchak, a native of Mshanets and a survivor of Bolshevik concentration camps, preserved the memories of Ivan Maksymovych (Dniprenko) from Halivka about the "Red Broom" operation and the events of late autumn 1944. At that time, there was a unit of Gonta, composed of young, unshot boys, and they were pursued by thousands of Red Army soldiers ("chervonopohonnyk" - "red shoulder mark"). During two weeks of blockades and daily battles, they maneuvered, engaging in combat only as a last resort. In each battle, there were casualties and injuries. Overnight, the boys covered up to 35 kilometers through the mountains. One night, Gonta ordered 16-year-old Ivan Maksymovych to stay with a severely wounded shooter in one house of the outskirts of Mshanets. They were placed in a barn ("zahata") and covered with hay. As a farewell, Gonta gave his pistol to the boy, ordering: "If the Bolsheviks find you, shoot the wounded man, then yourself, understood?"

=== Under Soviet occupation (1950s - 1991) ===
In 1951, due to the territorial exchange between the Soviet Union and Poland (the Ustryky district with its crude oil was exchanged for the Chervonohrad district with its coal), this small world was split in half, and one of its halves disappeared. The inhabitants of the western part of Mshanets (the hamlets of Zavadka), Mykhnovets, and Bandriv were resettled in the Odessa and Mykolaiv regions (in former German colonies). There weren't many Poles willing to settle in the mountains, so for some time, a group of Greek refugee-communists was joined with them. Mshanets, Halivka, Vytsiv, and Hrozova found themselves in a remote corner - in an extremely militarized border strip.

The reinforcement of the Soviet regime in the village occurred through harsh repression against civilians. For example, one of the "ordinary" cases: the family of Maria Stepanivna Kuchak and her husband's brother, Maftey Maksimovych Kuchak, along with their families, were deported to Siberia for three reasons - they lived in the same house, which was roofed with tin (a sign of prosperity - "kulakism"), they jointly built their own water mill (another sign of "kulakism"), and their sister Maria was in the UPA (Ukrainian Insurgent Army). "They loaded the family onto open trucks, despite the fact that there was a newborn baby boy, Mykhailo, who had just been recorded as born in Siberia."

Around 1960, the situation improved. In addition to collective farms (which provided only for a meager existence, considering the local agricultural conditions), a number of state farms were created for the exploitation of forest resources, including in Mshanets. Electrification was also carried out. Schools, including the Mshanets school, were operating successfully, and many local young people were obtaining higher education. Later, these individuals found employment in the cities of Ukraine and throughout the Soviet Union.

If we purely look at it from a material point of view, the 1960s to the 1980s were the period of greatest prosperity for these villages in their entire history. However, this could well turn out to be an illusion, as no one has thoroughly researched the material wealth of peasants during the Zubrytsky era and after it, nor compared it with a similar period during the Soviet era.

According to "The History of Cities and Villages of the Ukrainian SSR" (1968), the village had a population of 812 people (in 1937, there were 1300 people living in Mshanets). The Mshanets village council also administered the villages of Halivka and Ploske. The village sovkhoz "Prykordonnyk"; there was a mill and a forge. The main direction of the economy was flax-livestock farming. A parental university was organized near the secondary school, there was a club, library; a hospital with 25 beds operated, as well as household workshops. During the post-war period, 60 residential houses were built.

In the 1950s to 1970s, the residents of Mshanets dug three large ponds (known as the "Mshanets ponds"), which were used as refrigerators: in winter, they would cut ice and store it in a large cellar, where they would keep milk cool during the summer. The ice served as a natural refrigerator. Today, these ponds are used for fishing and recreational purposes in nature.

=== Independent Ukraine (1991 - present) ===
In the early 1990s, the totalitarian system had exhausted all its resources, and the Soviet Union collapsed. The independence of Ukraine was enthusiastically supported by the villagers. Both administratively and economically, the communist system disintegrated very quickly here.

On September 4, 1991, the first blue and yellow flag was hoisted above the dome of the Verkhovna Rada of Ukraine. This flag belonged to a resident of the village of Mshanets, Mykhailo Nahina. However, due to numerous global, nationwide, and local processes that still need to be objectively analyzed in historiographical perspective, the surrounding villages have found themselves on the brink of extinction over the past 30 years: the emigration of many young families, crumbling infrastructure, school closures, a rapid decline in population (for comparison: if in the 1980s, there were 600-700 students in the school in Mshanets, then in the 2020s, only 5 students remained in the village; overall - 140 residents).

==== The struggle for the road to Strilky-Mshanets ("Boykos Maydan") ====
The road from Strilky to Mshanets` C141704 stretches for 18 km and connects 11 border villages: Hvozdets`, Holovets`ko, Babyna, Vytsiv, Hroz`ova, Ripiana, Dnistryk, Smerechka, Ploske, Mshanets` and Halivka. For several decades it was in a state of disrepair, which led to the economic decline of the region and a social catastrophe. In early 2018 a UGCC priest from Mshanets Roman Hrom brought a collective appeal of the initiative group signed by local residents to Kiev to the majority MP, while simultaneously leaving complaints on the regional and government hotlines. But it did not work. So, on June 17, 2018, the priest and local children released a satirical music video “Vasia, Give Me a Paddle! How schoolchildren swim home…” about how, on their way home, pupils are forced to swim across a huge puddle on the road. A day later, journalists from 1+1 and NTA TV channels arrived and filmed their own stories about the road's condition. 1 km of the road was repaired during the summer of 2018. The year 2019 started hotly with the presidential election. On March 20 a parody of that time mega-popular hit "Plakala" (“Cried”) by the band "Kazka" was released — "Plakala: A Fairy Tale on the Road", which became an information "bomb", a real sensation, gaining more than 3 million views on all social networks. The ambulance that arrives late, the fire truck that gets stuck half a kilometer before the fire, the bread truck that rolls over with its goods into a ditch, the highway that repairs potholes with mud from the river — these are not the author's imagination, but the poetically sung realities of life in these villages...

The song's mentioning of all officials by name, from local officials to that time President of Ukraine Petro Poroshenko, caused a flurry of journalistic attention. Film crews from all national and Lviv TV channels came to Mshanets`. Together with the video a campaign was launched to collect signatures for two online petitions on "Overhaul of the Strilky-Mshanets` C141704 road" — to the Cabinet of Ministers of Ukraine and the Lviv Regional Council. The that time Prime Minister of Ukraine Volodymyr Groysman asked on live TV to wait until the government got to rural roads.

The elections were turbulent, and Volodymyr Zelenskyi became Ukraine's new President, who appointed a new head of the Lviv region. However, the situation with the road remained the same, and the initiative group's efforts to get an appointment with the head of the Lviv Regional State Administration were in vain. "What Does the Road Begin With?" is another video by children and a priest that draws attention to another problem — the terrible work of graders who «level» the road by piling up large mounds of clay in front of the ditch, making it impossible for water to drain off the road. This "work" was often done while drunk, with a shovel raised, which only slightly "smoothed" the surface of the road... However, despite the nationwide outcry and last year's promises of officials at various levels, UAH 0.0 was allocated for the overhaul of the Strilky-Mshanets road in 2019. This caused justified indignation among villagers, so on September 29 at the call of Mshanets` UGCC priest and the initiative group, they held the first peaceful protest on the international highway Lviv-Uzhhorod in the village of Lopushanka-Khomyna. The action lasted continuously for 3 days. The result: the process of preparing design and estimate documentation for 13 km of this road has begun.

On February 14, 2020, the president of Ukraine launched an ambitious program called «Big Construction: To Sew the Country Together». But on the same day, Lviv officials informed the initiative group that this program was not for our villages and not for Strilky-Mshanets` road, which met all its criteria: it connected half of the villages of Strilky territorial community with the main hospital, school, community center, etc. Six months of attempts to get an appointment with the new head of the Lviv Region Maksym Kozytskyy proved fruitless: all official avenues were closed to the initiative group. "It's spring in the Carpathians — it's green, but our work is still stuck..." — a cry of despair from the new video "Quarantine Forever" (this alludes to the informal nickname of President Zelenskyy's shoulder advisors, whose surname in Ukrainian means "Green"). 2020 is a year of unprecedented quarantine restrictions around the world. But in these villages, these restrictions were not felt in any way, de facto "quarantine" here lasted for several decades: when it rained, they swam on the road, and in sunny weather, they suffocated from dust, the ability to move was very, very limited. At the same time, children in Halivka filmed a real video of how they planted a potato on the road (they harvested it a couple of months later when it was ripe).

The officials' promise to repair the first 4 km of the road turned out to be empty, and the approval of design estimates for 13 km of the road was postponed until the end of December 2020, which meant that no repairs could be carried out this year.

In 2020, a record UAH 5 billion 122 million was allocated from various sources for road repairs in the Lviv region, which is, for example, 2.5 times more than in 2018. To cover 17 kilometers of Strilky-Mshanets` road with one layer of asphalt, UAH 148 million (2.9% of the total amount) was needed. However, the responses received by the initiative group echoed those of previous years, conveying the message that funding was unavailable and advising them to postpone their request until the following year.

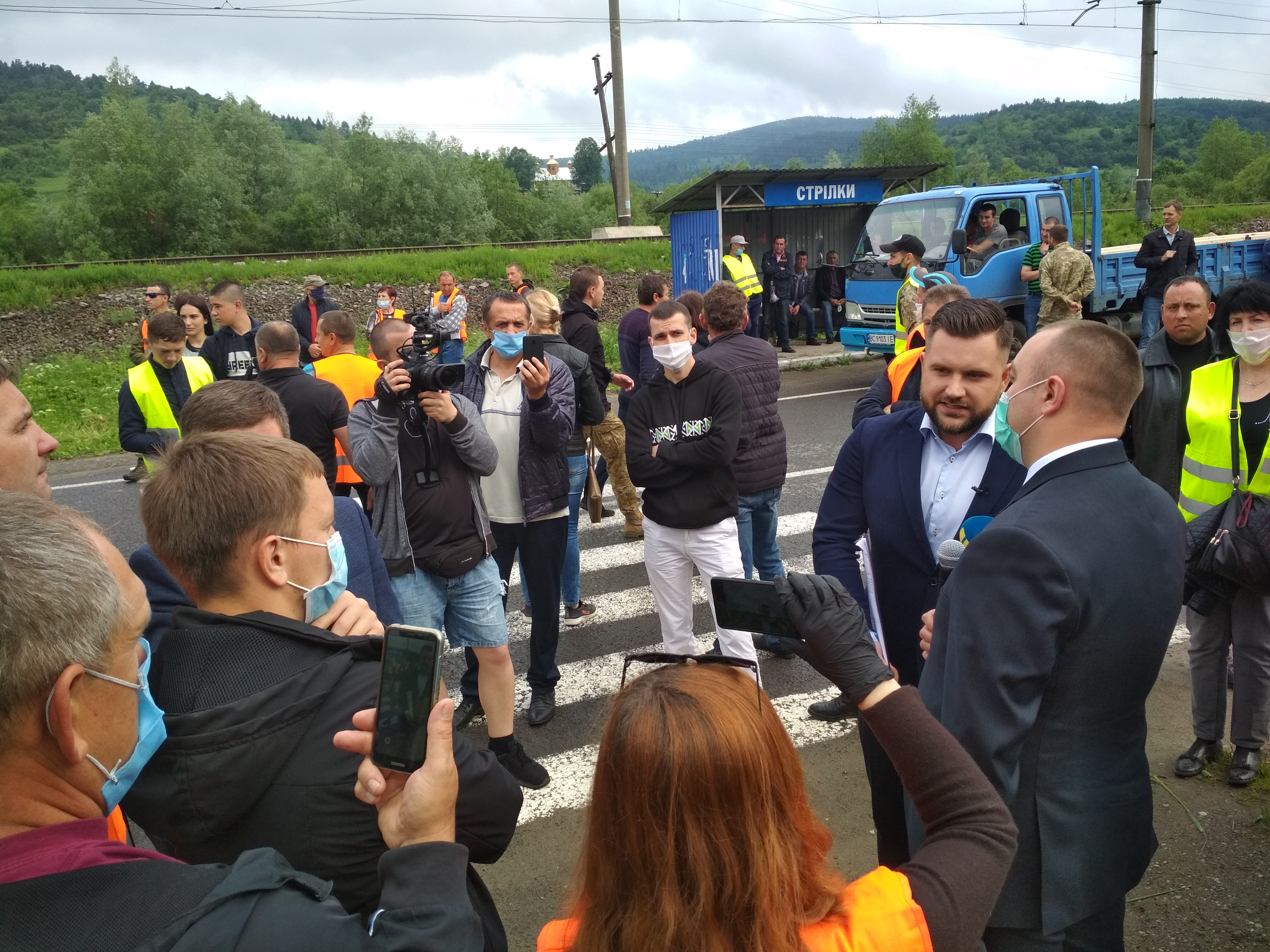
Second action demanding major road repair from Strilky to Mshanets, June 17–22, 2020.

In June the community realized that the approval of the design and estimate documentation (DED), which was already de facto ready, was being deliberately delayed until the end of the year to avoid starting repairs. Since all other means had been exhausted, the last option was the second peaceful protest, which began on June 17 and (excluding weekends) lasted for 4 days without interruption. The DED was approved, but funds were allocated to repair 600 meters of road. On July 13, the last protest action began on Lviv-Uzhhorod highway in Strilky, which lasted for 5 days. At the same time the UGCC priest Roman Hrom and 3 parishioners from Mshanets` — Hanna Hudz, Oksana Parashchak, and Nadiia Yavorska — went on a hunger strike until the issue was resolved (they were on hunger strike for less than 4 days). The protesters filmed a music video "Warriors of Light" address to the president of Ukraine, which became the unofficial anthem of the "Road Dignity Action" or "Boyko Maidan" (this is an allusion to the events of the Revolution of Dignity or "Maidan" hat occurred six years prior in Kiev).

On July 15, passing by the village of Strilky en route to the city of Turka for a working visit, the head of the Lviv Regional State Administration, Maksym Kozytskyy, was unable to offer a specific solution to the residents of the villages after an hour-long conversation. Therefore, his vehicle (in which Vasyl Vikonsky, who was then in charge of the Lviv Region National Police, was also present) was not allowed to proceed further.

The reversal of the head of the region led to the most acute phase of the conflict: the disappearance of police officers who were legally guarding the peaceful protest and their replacement by disguised officers, subpoenas to activists, "titushky" and sent provocateurs, running over protesters on a pedestrian crossing, attempts to pit protesters and drivers against each other, blocking the road with trucks, incitement to fight — these and other provocations were withstood with dignity by the villagers, who gave no reason for the violent dispersal of the action.

The support of the Ukrainian and international community, which watched the events live on Facebook by pupils, eventually prompted the authorities to sign a memorandum with the community and allocate the necessary funds. In 2020, half of the road was already paved with asphalt. The works resumed in 2021. By the end of autumn 2021, almost the entire road had a single-layer asphalt surface, with several kilometers covered with a double-layer. The works were interrupted by the full-scale invasion of the russian federation into Ukraine on February 24, 2022.

==== As part of the Strilky hromada (2020 - present) ====
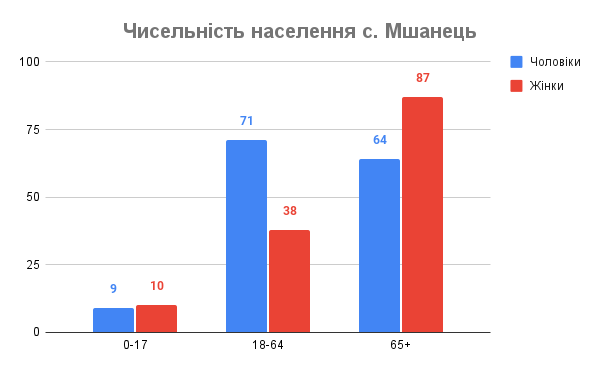
The population of the village of Mshanets in 2021

In 2019-2020, the decentralization reform was concluding, during which some political forces aimed to create the largest amalgamated territorial community in Ukraine with its center in the city of Staryi Sambir. This would have had extremely negative implications for the further existence of this region (for instance, from the village of Halivka to Staryi Sambir is 35 km). Therefore, the residents of 21 villages had to fight for their right to unite around Strilky.

On October 25, 2020, local elections were held, during which the deputy body and the head of the newly established Strilky territorial community, Mykola Drozd, were elected. A year prior, in 2019, the religious community of the Ukrainian Greek Catholic Church in the village of Mshanets began construction of their own social enterprise, "Mshanetski Kolyby" ("Mshanets Huts") - a summer complex for hosting Christian camps, youth camps, and more. Over time, it evolved into a unique hub and community development platform, serving as the foundation for the establishment and implementation of other social initiatives.

Every year from 2019 to 2022, charitable events were held in Mshanets in collaboration with the volunteer initiative "Building Ukraine Together."

On September 26, 2021, the Festival "Visiting the Boykos and Fr. Mykhailo Zubrytskyi" was organized. It was an educational and cultural festival aimed at bringing together the best examples from various spheres of traditional and contemporary Boyko culture – including music, dance, crafts, designer clothing, and unique historical "cases." It served as a kind of "Boyko networking" event, acting as a creative cross-sector platform for forming partnerships between representatives of cultural and creative industries, local residents, authorities, entrepreneurs, and activists. The festival aimed to enhance the tourist attractiveness of the mountainous Boyko region by revitalizing the resources of cultural heritage and local identity as one of the factors of contemporary Ukrainian identity. At the festival, famous traditional Boyko and contemporary bands performed, and collections of modern Boyko clothing was shown ("Boyko Fashion Show"). Additionally, there were numerous other workshops, including scarf tying, trembita playing, playing the sopilka and drymba, weaving loom, motanka dolls, straw crafts, face painting, a "living" photo zone with sheep, Franko's bench, and tasting of authentic Boyko cuisine, among others.

During 2020-2022, an original charitable online fair titled "Christmas Delicacies from Mshanets" was successfully conducted. Craft bags were filled with environmentally friendly products for the Holy Supper, including honey, mushrooms, nuts, beans, garlic, Carpathian tea, and others. Specifically for this charitable fair, a music video titled "Christmas Delicacies from Mshanets" was produced, featuring local children.

In the village, cultural tourism is actively developing. In 2021, a collaborative effort between the Lviv National Literary and Memorial Museum of Ivan Franko and the Ukrainian Cultural Foundation led to the execution of a multifaceted initiative titled "FrankoTravels +". This endeavor was designed to utilize interactive technologies in presenting the historical epoch of Ivan Franko's life through contemporary travel itineraries. Within this initiative, Ivan Franko serves as a guide, imparting a distinctive narrative to tourists and reshaping their perception of the past. A pivotal component of this undertaking was the establishment of a two-day tourist route, "To Pikui!", spanning 167 km, and incorporating overnight accommodations in Mshanets village. The route locations include Lviv, Sambir, Staryi Sambir, Hrozova, Mshanets, Vovche, Turka, Rozluch, Yasenytsia-Zamkova, and Kryvka.

Diverse private tours to Mshanets have been developed and implemented by the largest tour operator in Western Ukraine, "Vidviday."

Since 2022, a goat farm has been under construction in the village of Mshanets, where cheese production will take place on-site.

On October 23, 2022, an event titled "166 Years to the Same Father" commemorated another anniversary of Father Mykhailo Zubrytskyi's birth. Following a celebratory Eastern Catholic liturgy, the local community organized a "Boyko Dinner at Mshanetski Kolyby" with a sopilka master class and "tokan" preparation. A discussion-conference with Professor Yaroslav Hrytsak, opened by Professor Frank Sysyn from Canada (online) and Natalia Hrom, covered the theme "Centuries Change, but Problems Remain." The event also featured a presentation of Professor Hrytsak's book "Overcoming the Past: Global History of Ukraine," which quickly sold out.

In April 2023, the "Friends of Mshanets" project was launched - a fundraising campaign for those who wish to support various cultural and sacral-artistic projects of the Mshanets community and make monthly contributions of 50+ UAH through automatic setup in the banking systems 'Privat24', 'Oschad24', or similar. Depending on the amount of the monthly contribution, one can become a 'Friend' (50 UAH), a 'Friend-Patron' (100 UAH), a 'Friend-Ambassador' (150 UAH), or a 'Friend-Senator' (200 UAH and more) and thus become a full member of the Mshanets community, influence decision-making, and make proposals for community improvement and more.

On November 8, 2022, music teacher Yaroslav Mytsak, along with teachers from neighboring villages, organized the festival "Polehojky, Boykos! Mshanetski Kolyby" that featured folklore performances by children's groups, rare Boyko songs, and masterclasses on Boyko instruments and traditional cooking, along with a Paraklesis to St. Demetrius. In July 2023, the implementation of the project "BoykoMandry: Tourist Routes of the Strilky Rural Hromada" began. The project envisages the creation of three (in the first stage) comprehensive historical and cultural routes to enhance the tourist attractiveness of mountain villages by updating, popularizing, and enriching the Boyko cultural heritage with new meanings. The routes will lead to historical and cultural tourist locations (such as the "Tower of Memory," insurgent hideouts, etc.), revealing unique "cases" of local history along the way for travelers. The project will also establish a system of informal education for local residents, who can potentially become guides or provide accompanying tourist services. The integration of the "BoykoMandry" routes into the network of joint Ukrainian-Polish tourist paths is planned, along with the promotion of Boyko cultural heritage in the Polish community. The project is funded by the Ukrainian Cultural Foundation and the Strilky Village Council.

In September 2023, the implementation of a pilot project for the youth of the Strilky hromada began - "Miracle Makers School": a course of informal education in project management for schoolchildren and students, with the opportunity to win funding from local entrepreneurs for their own social project for the community.

In May 2024, the village parish community won the “Enhancing the Capacity of Private Farmers” competition and purchased a new agricultural tractor, which provides plowing, cultivating, mowing, raking, planting, and potato digging at social rates, and will later be used to clear snow from roads.

===== russian invasion of Ukraine (2022 - present) =====
For more information see here: russian invasion of Ukraine.

In 2022 invasion of Russia into Ukraine, the community at "Mshanetski Kolyby" organizes rehabilitation camps with psychological support for children and adolescents affected by the war. Additionally, in 2023, rehabilitation camps and weekends were also organized, with ukrainian military personnel and their families participating as well.

In 2022, with the assistance of donors, two large families of internally displaced persons (IDPs) from Hostomel (family of a military personnel) and Sumy Oblast purchased and were gifted houses in Mshanets. Furthermore, in 2024, another large family of IDPs, who participated in the rehabilitation camp, independently acquired a house for themselves. In April 2024, the religious community of the Ukrainian Greek Catholic Church in the village of Mshanets donated the "old plebaniya," (parish house for priest) which was in church ownership, to another large family (with 8 children, the eldest son serves in the Armed Forces of Ukraine) from the Donetsk region who previously resided in Staryi Sambir and Holovetsko.

On July 4, 2022, at the initiative of the wife of a local priest ("jimost"), teenagers participating in the rehabilitation camp filmed an educational eco-clip titled "Clean Up the Carpathians as You Would Your Own Backyard," dedicated to the memory of the late environmental activist and Ukrainian scout, Roman Zhuk.

In January 2023, participants of the combined Vertep from the villages of Mshanets, Halivka, and Ploske, along with children of IDPs, organized a Vertep challenge to raise funds for a vehicle for the 65th brigade of the Ukrainian Armed Forces - the "Vertep Mobile." Twelve other verteps from villages such as Babyna, Holovetsko, Topilnytsia, Velykosillia, Sosnivka, Potik, Nahuievychi, Ladantsi, Zhupany, participated. The verteps collectively raised funds for 2 vehicles. At the end of 2024, the story of the "Vertep Mobile" took an unexpected turn: one of the young men who had participated in the nativity play and caroling to fund it, upon reaching adulthood, signed a contract with the Armed Forces of Ukraine and was granted the right to use the "vertep-mobile" for military service.

On November 26, 2023, the local priest of the Ukrainian Greek Catholic Church, Father Roman Hrom, and the chaplain of the 80th Air Assault Brigade, Father Ivan Halyo, announced the start of the "Christmas Birds" verteps campaign - fundraising for drones for the Armed Forces of Ukraine, including the mentioned brigade. By January 13, 2024, 101 vertep, 48 caroler groups, 54 communities, and 39 private individuals joined the campaign, raising almost 5 million UAH for drones. Additionally, international communities from Cambridge (United Kingdom), the State of Maryland (USA), Spain, Winnipeg (Canada), and Italy participated in the campaign.

The total amount collected was 5,421,472.30 UAH in the bank account of the NGO "Mahura" and $5,400 in cash from the USA.

On January 13, 2024, a congress of all participants of the "Christmas Birds" campaign took place, during which the Ukrainian Record was set for the largest number of verteps with Christmas stars performing the carol "There in Bahmut" (105 groups, 1259 individuals). Additionally, soldiers from the 80th brigade of the Armed Forces of Ukraine near the city of Bahmut also participated in caroling through online communication.

As a result of the campaign, the following were purchased: 10 sets of "antennas"; 30 sets of "antennas"; 5 televisions; 30 controllers for Mavics; 35 Mavic 3 quadcopters; 10 sets of electronic warfare (EW) equipment.

In December 2024 - January 2025, the "Christmas Birds" initiative was organized for the second time, this time to raise funds for electronic warfare systems for the 80th Air Assault Brigade.

==== "EuroBorder": The Fight Against the Establishment of the 5 km Border Zone "Ghetto" with the EU and the Black Sea (April 2024 - Present) ====
In April 2024, border troops seek to convert Mshanets and other surrounding villages located within 5 km of the state border with Poland into restricted areas with special permits for residency and any activities (tourism, economic, agricultural), along with special passes for staying, citing changes to Cabinet of Ministers Resolution No. 1147 "On the Border Regime." If the establishment of a 5-kilometer border strip is implemented, it will lead to the complete abandonment of these villages in the near future (3–5 years). The area of the 5-kilometer border zone with the European Union and Moldova (excluding the area of border territories of Rivne communities with Poland) is 12 thousand square kilometers, which is equivalent to the area of the Ternopil region. These new changes contradict at least 9 articles of the Constitution of Ukraine - the main law of the state. In the Lviv oblast, the 5 km border zone includes 110 villages and towns, in the Zakarpattia oblast it includes 120 villages and towns, and this zone also encompasses villages and towns in the Chernivtsi, Ivano-Frankivsk, Vinnytsia, Odesa, and other oblasts.

On April 14, 2024, the first public meetings of residents of Mshanets, Halivka, and Ploske took place, with a resolution declaring the impermissibility of returning to Soviet practices and calling on other border towns and villages in the Lviv, Zakarpattia, and Chernivtsi regions (which do not border Russia or Belarus) to unite and resist. On April 21, 2024, at the initiative of Lieutenant Colonel Serhiy Hrabovsky, chief of the Smilnytsia Border Service Department, another public meeting was held in the village of Mshanets, which ended with the escape of border guards.

On April 26, 2024, the deputies of the Strilky village council appealed to the President of Ukraine Volodymyr Zelenskyy, the Chairman of the Verkhovna Rada Ruslan Stefanchuk, the Prime Minister of the Cabinet of Ministers Denys Shmyhal, the head of the Lviv Oblast State Administration Maksym Kozytskyi, and the Deputy Chairman of the Lviv Oblast Council Yurii Kholod with a call to cancel these changes in the territories bordering the European Union, as they are harmful to the development of these areas, unjustified, and violate at least 9 articles of the Constitution of Ukraine. Similar appeals were made by the deputies of the Dobromyl and Khyriv city councils. On May 15, 2024, a negative response was received from the Deputy Minister of Internal Affairs Oleksii Serhieiev, which contained numerous manipulations and cynical statements.

On June 21, the wife of a local priest Nataliia Hrom released an original music video-rap about the 5 km border zone "ghetto". Despite the social media buzz (with over 230,000 views on TikTok alone) and the significant social issue highlighted in the video, not a single national or regional media outlet wrote any articles or produced any journalistic pieces about it. This anomalous disregard indicates the presence of serious censorship over journalists and media owners, orchestrated by central authorities, as media from the Lviv, Zakarpattia, Chernivtsi, Ivano-Frankivsk, Vinnytsia, and Odesa oblasts ignored the music video-rap. It also points to a deliberate state policy of creating a special zone on the border with the European Union and the Black Sea (possibly at the unofficial behest of the European Union leadership). The first publication about this issue was released on "Hromadske" on September 18, 2024.

=== Population ===
In 1836, there were 1115 Greek Catholics.

In 1880, there were 955 Greek Catholics.

In 1937, there were 1300 residents.

In 1968, there were 812 residents.

In 2001, there were 402 residents.

As of 2022, the population is de facto 170 people (de jure 256 adults).

=== National minorities ===
In documents of the 18th century, there are mentions of Jewish innkeepers. From the 19th century until the 1940s, they played a dual role as small traders and rural farmers, although it is unknown when exactly Jews began to engage in agriculture. During the time of Father Mykhailo Zubrytskyi, there were 30 Jews living in the village.

It is difficult to establish when the Romani people appeared here. Formally, they were equated with peasants: they were members of local parishes and considered farmers, but they lived separately and engaged in their traditional activities (blacksmithing, fortune-telling, and music). Father Mykhailo Zubrytskyi provides data that the Romani people did not participate in parish life and became notorious among peasants for their laziness - they refused to plant gardens and preferred to beg in other places.

For the fate of the German colony in Bandriv, see above.

Poles did not reside in the village of Mshanets, except for one visiting Pole.

== The Church of the Nativity of the Blessed Virgin Mary ==
=== The first known wooden church of the 16th century ===
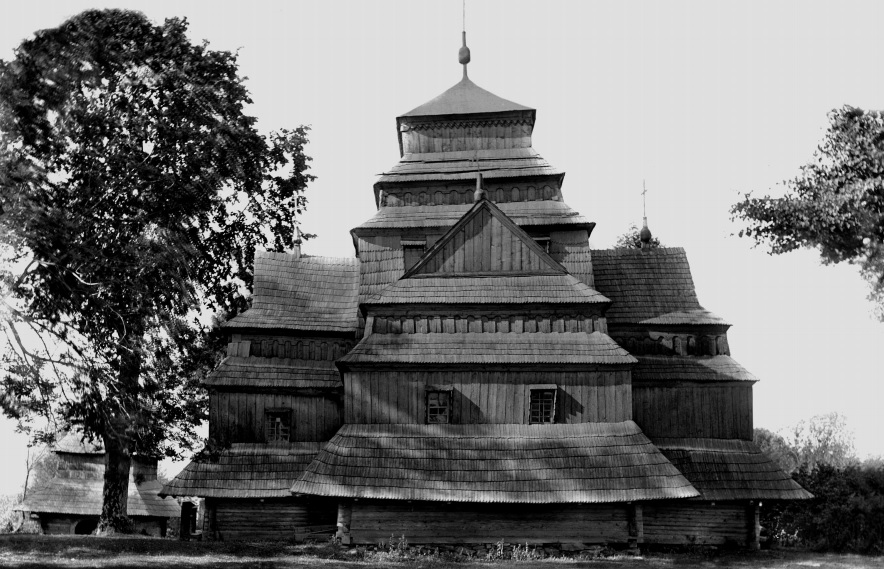
The Church of the Nativity of the Blessed Virgin Mary in the village of Mshanets, 1762. View from the north.

The first mentions of the old wooden church in Mshanets date back to the year 1507. However, as Professor Yaroslav Taras points out, the fact that "the first mention of the village of Mshanets [...] dates back to 1446, the presence of an ancient Rus' hillfort from the 11th-13th centuries on Mount Magura-Limnyanska, the existence of the nearby Peremyshl-Sambir diocese, and the location in the area of a large number of monasteries [...] allows us to once again affirm that this example was a relic representative of sacred construction from princely times, which continued to be produced in the 16th-18th centuries by monasteries strictly adhering to canonical sacred construction."

The uniqueness of the architecture of the old church is also evidenced by Polish researchers Paweł Kusal and Stanisław Kryciński:

"The church from Mshanets, built in 1762 on the plan of a Greek cross, has an absolutely unique structure. Above the intersection of the naves, there is a saddle-like completion with two bends. The ridge roofs covering the four wings of the church are also divided, and on the wall separating their sections, there is decoration reminiscent of an arcade frieze found in brick buildings. This same motif adorns the lower step of the ridge finial."

The old church, like most churches in the Carpathians, served signaling and defensive functions: "From this place, the entire village was well visible, as well as the valley on both sides of the Mshanka River, providing visual signals of danger from the villages of Halivka, Ploske, and Hrozova." "All homesteads in the village of Mshanets were fenced, and public gates were installed on the road leading from the village (at the expense of the community)." Obviously, the entire village was also fenced, which was quite practical at that time.

=== The second church building from 1762 ===
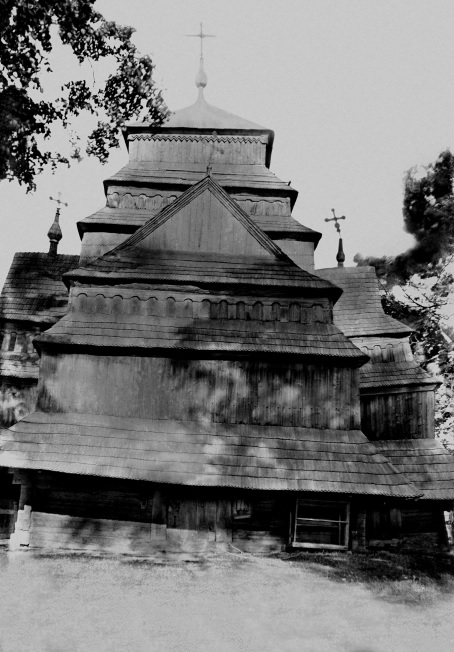
The Church of the Nativity of the Blessed Virgin Mary in the village of Mshanets, 1762. View from the west. Disassembled in 1912. Photo by V. Shcherbakivsky from the collection of negatives of the Institute of Folklore of the National Academy of Sciences of Ukraine.

The relocation of churches in the 18th and 19th centuries to more convenient locations for the community was a common phenomenon in Galicia. It is unknown whether a new structure was built in Mshanets or if the old one was dismantled in 1762 and moved to a new location. However, Professor Yaroslav Taras presents arguments in favor of the latter version. This is also supported by data from the map "Galizien und Lodomerien (1779–1783) - First Military Survey."

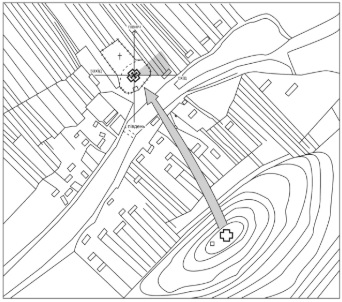
The relocation of the Church of the Nativity of the Blessed Virgin Mary in Mshanets, 1762.

The Mshanets church differs not only from the Boyko-type tridilny (three-part) and triverkh (three-dome) churches but also from other cruciform churches in Podillia, Hutsulshchyna, and Slobozhanshchyna. It had a four-sided, two-nave upper structure above the nave.

The presence of a four-sided upper structure in wooden cruciform churches indicates that they are examples of medieval Ukrainian sacred architecture. It is difficult to reliably indicate how this relic from princely times survived until the 18th century. By analogy with Byzantine masonry churches, a wooden church of St. John the Baptist was built in the princely times of Galician Podillya (mid-12th to early 13th century).

Churches similar to the one in Mshanets are no longer preserved. We only have information that a similar type of church existed, such as the Peter and Paul Church in the city of Peremyshl (14th century) and the church in the village of Verbizh (1577). Today, it is unknown how many such churches were built in Ukraine.

"Some guesses about the tradition of four-pitched roofs may bring to mind the cross churches from Slobozhanshchyna, which not only have the characteristic features of richer halls in the "Boiko style" but also have pitches with irregular octagonal shapes, which are more like squares with trimmed corners."

In 1909, the renowned researcher of Ukrainian history, Vadym Shcherbakivskyi, visited the parish priest of Mshanets village, Father Mykhailo Zubrytskyi, during a scientific journey to the Boykivshchyna region commissioned by the Shevchenko Scientific Society in Lviv. He was supposed to "trace the distinctions of the Boyko type of churches, starting from the common..." and to provide an answer to Ihor Hrabar, stating that Boyko churches "differ from Muscovite, or rather, better to say, the general Great Russian style and have nothing in common with the Northern Russian (Arkhangelsk, Olonets, Vologda)...".

Because the Church of the Nativity of the Blessed Virgin Mary did not fit into the Boyko architectural type based on its architectural and layout parameters, it was not included in his numerous works published after this journey, which debunked the myth of the connection between Boyko churches and Muscovite ones. We knew nothing about the architecture of the Church of the Nativity of the Blessed Virgin Mary of 1762 until 1937 and may never have found out if it were not for another circumstance: the researcher of Ukrainian wooden architecture, Mykhailo Dragan, drew attention to a photograph by V. Shcherbakivskyi, which was preserved in the archive of the Shevchenko Scientific Society, and determined that there was a unique monument of wooden sacred architecture in Mshanets village. Mykhailo Dragan classified it as a cruciform single-story church, which has "rare, clean quadrilateral tops" with two bends, and noted that it is a solitary cruciform church, indicating that "borrowed forms of wooden churches did not deviate far from similar forms of masonry ones".

In this church, birth and death records from 1785 and marriage records from 1788 were kept.

Reverse side of the handwritten Latin-language Schematism of the Zhukotyn Deanery, dated 23 October 1836, containing the entry on the village of Mshanets - No. 11.

Fragment of the reverse side of the handwritten Latin-language schematism of the Zhukotyn Deanery, dated 23 October 1836. Original entry: "11. Mszaniec parochia. Eccl. ad nativitatem B. V. Mariæ. Patronus Aug. Imperator. Parochus Joannes Demianowski nat. 1762 ord. 1788."

In 1836, the patron of the church was the Emperor. The village was home to 1,175 Greek Catholics.

=== The unrealized project of Father M. Zubrytskyi ===
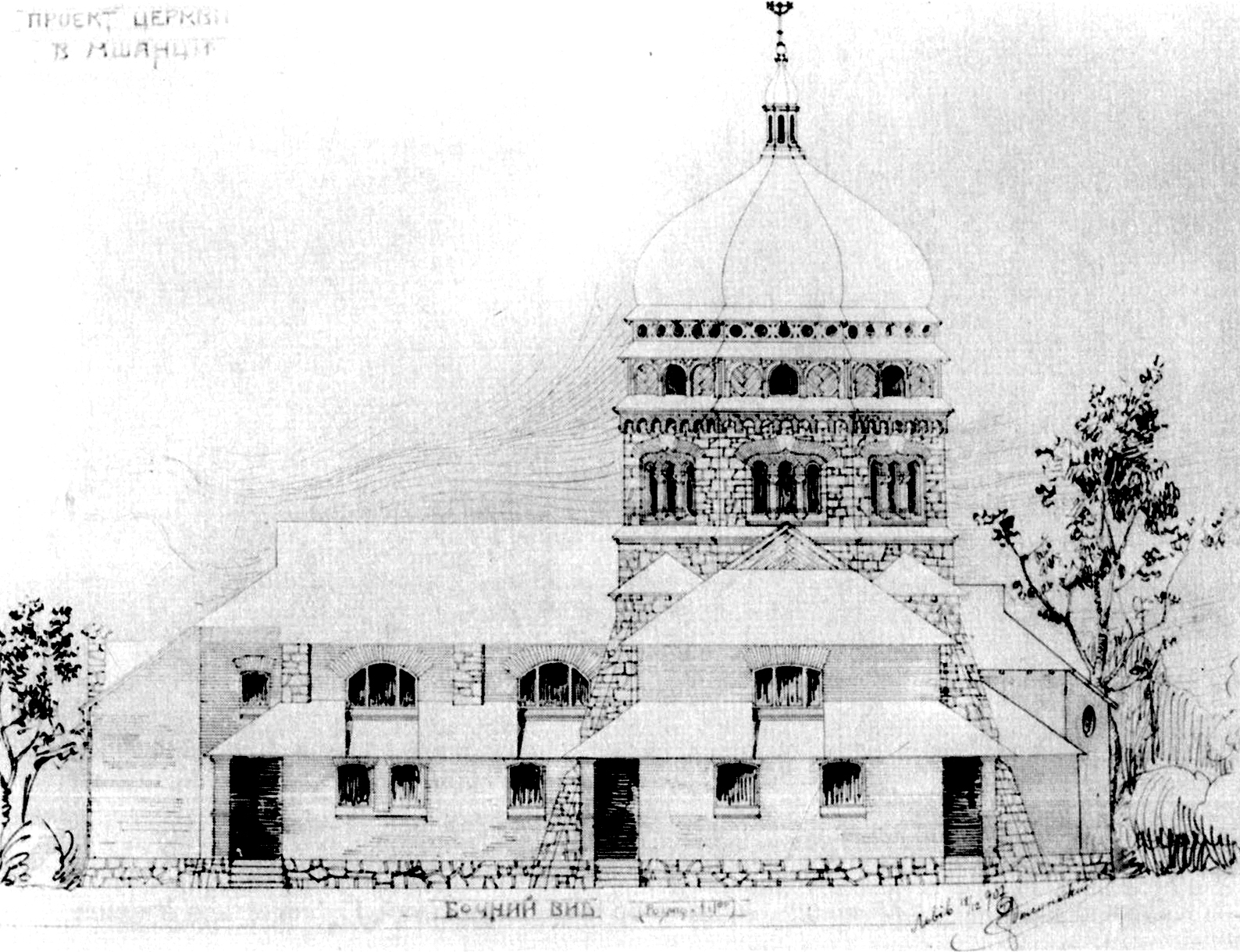
Unrealized project of the church for the village of Mshanets, Lviv oblast.

Since his arrival at the parish in 1883 and seeing the critical condition of the old church, Father Mykhailo Zubrytskyi worked tirelessly to raise funds for the construction of a unique stone church, which was intended to become the spiritual and educational center of the Boykivshchyna region.

To raise funds, he pioneered "church business" in Mshanets: for nine years, he persuaded the church brotherhood to purchase candles directly from the factory at wholesale prices and sell them with a small markup. Not all villagers embraced the innovation ("since when did the church engage in business?"), and some continued to buy candles from local Jews and bring them to the church. However, gradually they got used to it, bought candles, and the proceeds were deposited into a separate account.

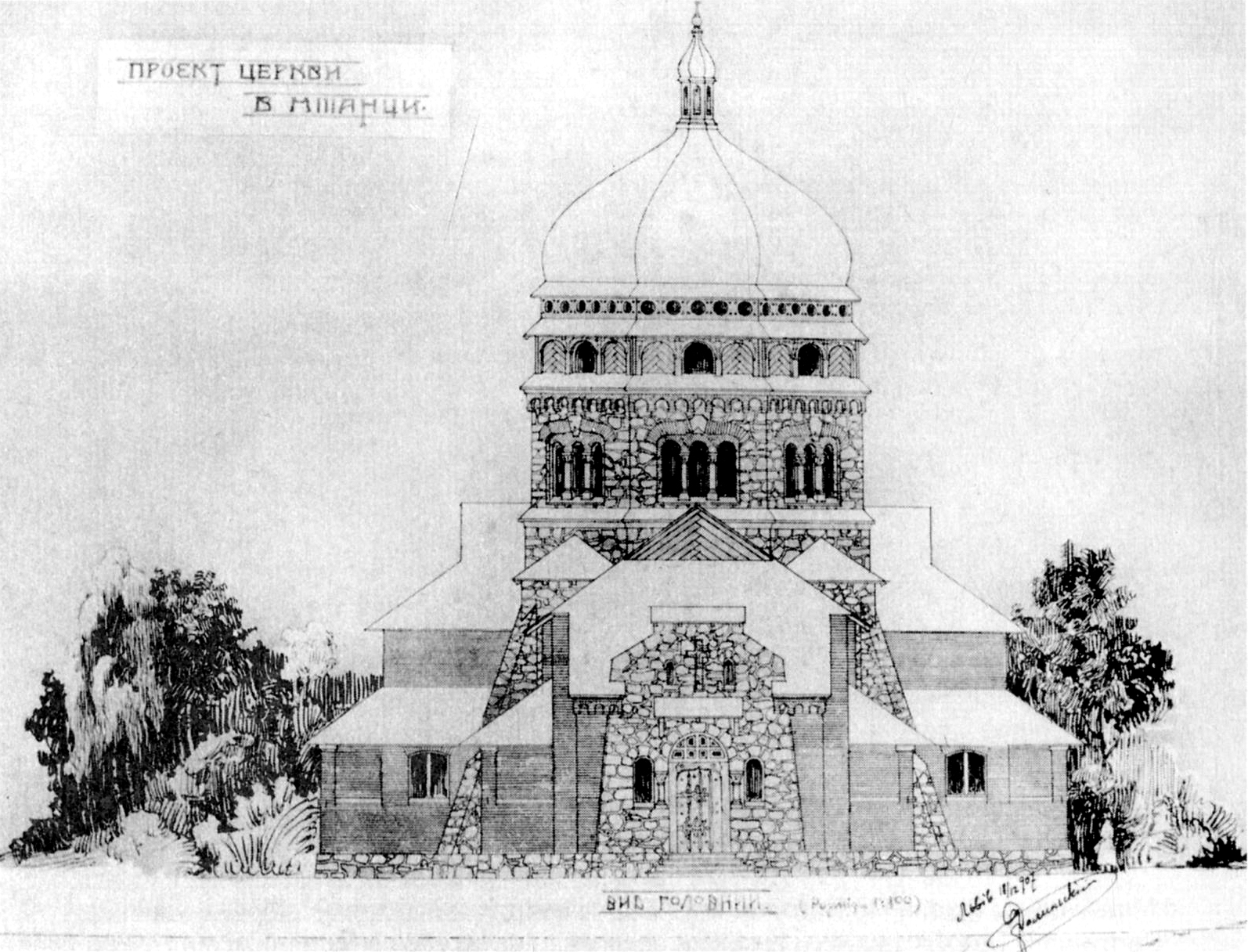
Unrealized project of the church for the village of Mshanets, Lviv oblast.

It can be argued that by 1905/6 certain funds were already accumulated "in a savings account at the post office" because at that time, after 20 years of pastoral work, Father Mykhailo began searching for an architect to develop a project for a masonry church.

On December 18, 1907, just before Saint Nicholas Day, the project for the masonry church and bell tower was created free of charge by the renowned Lviv architect Ivan Dolynskyi, who at the time was designing residential buildings in the modern style. The design was influenced by the decorative phase of Ukrainian style (1900-1908), combining features of sacred architecture of Ancient Rus' and Byzantium with Romanesque style elements.

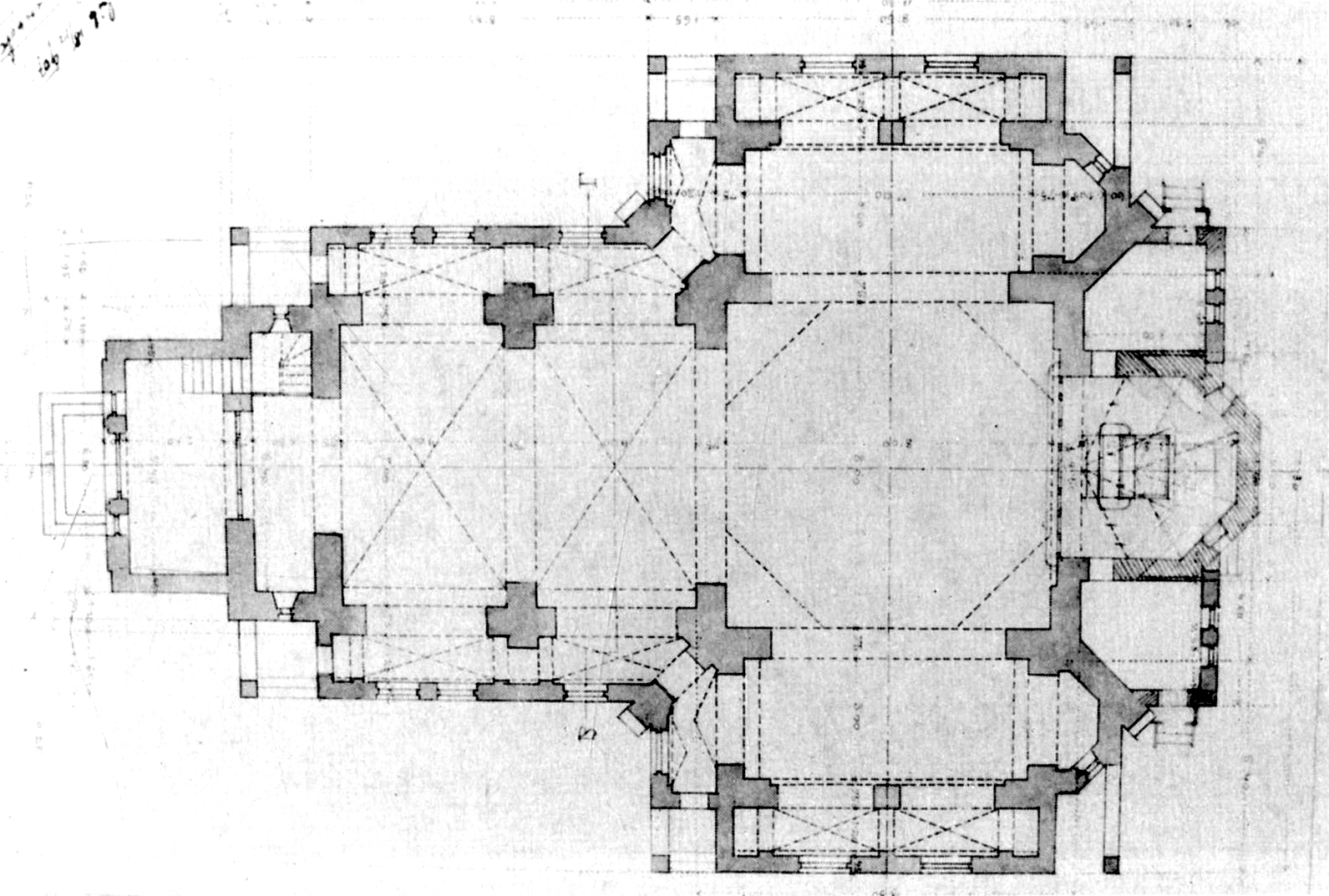
Drawing. Unimplemented project of a stone church for the village of Mshanets. Architect - Ivan Dolinsky.

The project is executed on 5 cardboard panels: the first one presents the "foundation and crypt ("sklep - склеп") plan"; the second one - "ground plan"; the third one - "bell tower"; the fourth one - "main view"; the fifth one - "roof structure".

The church plan had the shape of a cross. At the same time, the spatial design was based on ancient Rus' churches: three naves with an enlarged central one and three apses. The facade was supposed to combine ancient Rus' and Romanesque features. Elements of folk architecture were also present.

According to the project, the masonry church had dimensions of 20.4 x 27.4 meters. It was a three-apsed, three-nave structure similar to Byzantine churches, where the central nave only slightly exceeded the side ones. The planning scheme of the Mshanets church shows similarities to the temples of princely times, particularly to the Church of the Dmytro Monastery, the Church of St. George, and the Church of St. Irene in Kyiv.

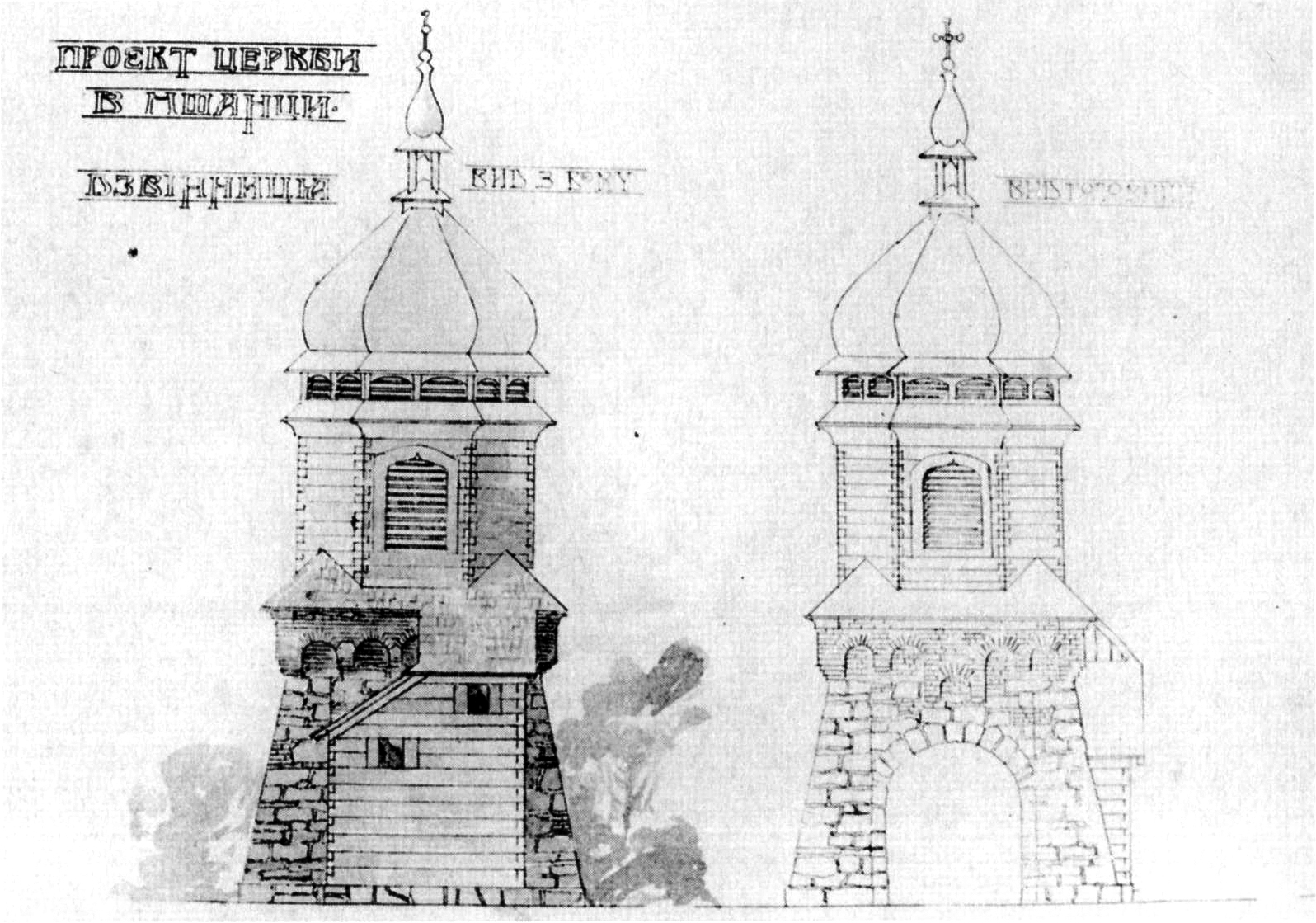
Unrealized project of a masonry bell tower for the village of Mshanets. Architect - Ivan Dolynsky.

The ensemble with the church included a two-story bell tower of an octagonal shape on a square base. The first floor had an entrance leading to the churchyard, while the bells were located on the second floor. The first floor was square in plan with contr-forms ("контрформи") at corners, made of brick and faced with crushed rubble stone, while the second floor was wooden in the form of an octagon, covered with a cupola that matched the church in shape.

To realize such a church, it was necessary not only to have a lot of money but also skilled builders who could construct the roofing over the "ground plan," where Father M. Zubrytsky planned to organize crypts for burial, erect pillars with buttresses, lay arches between the walls, and build a dome with a diameter of 8 meters. The planned church also required a large quantity of building materials, such as bricks and stone. All of this delayed the start of construction, which could have begun in the spring of 1908. Five years passed, and the village community had not raised the necessary funds for the materials for the new church, prompting M. Zubrytsky to resort to radical decisions that would allow construction to begin after all.

In 1912, the church was dismantled. However, due to the pre-war inflation, the First World War, the arrest of the parish priest in 1914, and many other circumstances, the new masonry church was not built. Instead, only after 10 years, in 1922, did they begin to build the present-day wooden Church of the Nativity of the Blessed Virgin Mary.

=== Modern building ===
They began construction in 1922 and completed it in 1924. This wooden church was built in the Neo-Ukrainian style. The author of the project has not been identified.

The iconostasis from the old church was transferred to this new one.

During the Soviet occupation from 1962 to 1989, the church was closed.

The walls below the eaves of the church are made of open log construction, while above the eaves, they are vertically clad with boards with battens, which were freed from yellow paint during repairs in 2010-2011 and covered with a protective solution. At the same time, all windows of the church (except those in the sacristy) were replaced with plastic ones, and new wooden doors were installed.

On one of the walls of the southern nave of the church, there is a bas-relief of Father Mykhailo Zubrytskyi.

The walls in the interior of the church are made of exposed log cabin.

In 1991, the community of Mshanets decided to carry out repair works in the church. Special attention was paid to the roof and the replacement of the destroyed floor. Yaroslav Stetskovych, Teodoziy Fedash, Vasyl Petrychkovych, Vasyl Piznak (Huyvaniv), Vasyl Baran, Levko Voloshanivsky, and others were involved in laying the parquet floor. During the floor renovation in the altar of the church, a note for future generations of the Mshanets community was found under the floor. Due to damage to the paper, it was decided to laminate the note and preserve it for descendants.

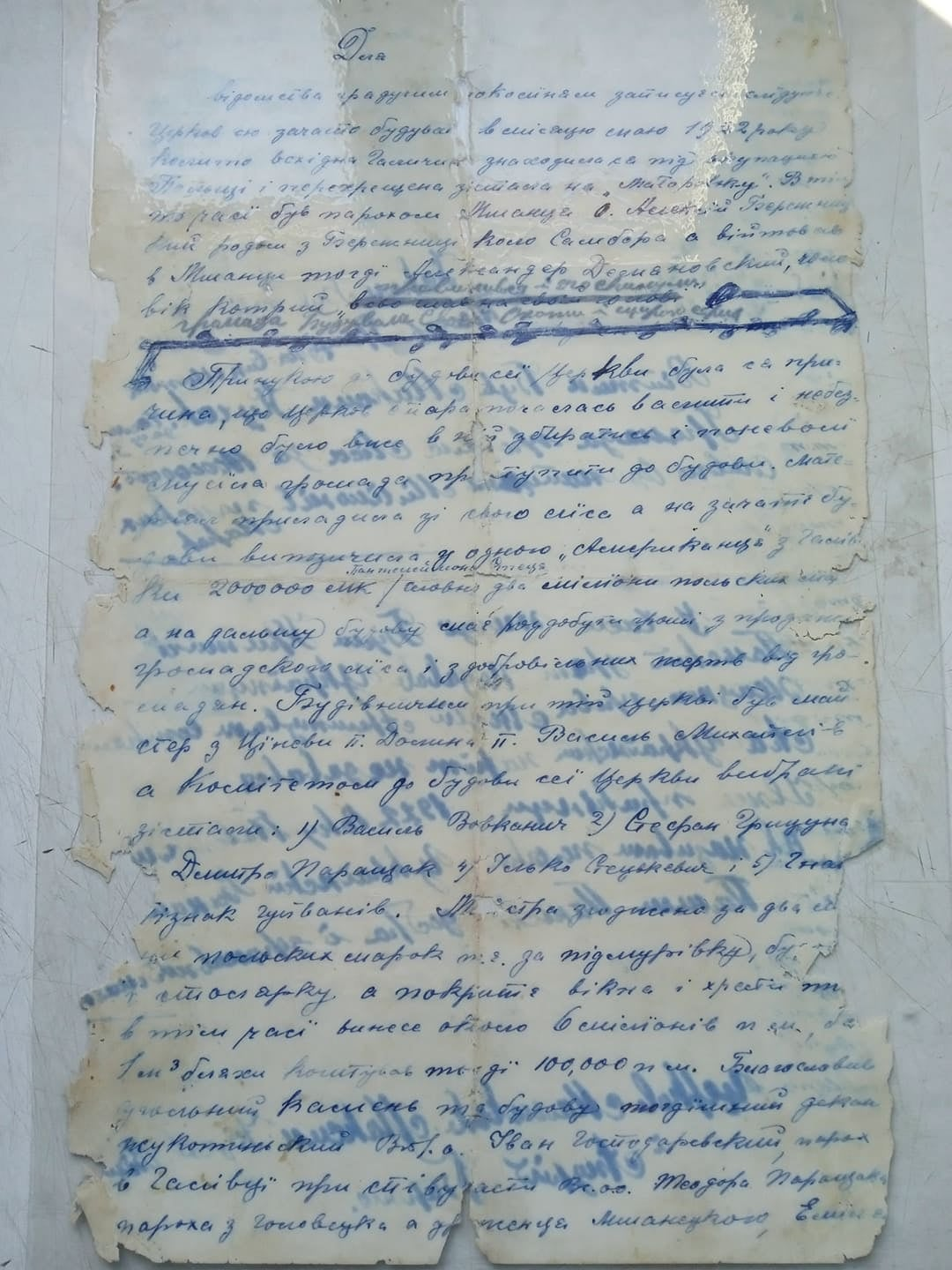
The note to future generations of Mshanets about the construction of the church in 1922 (1)

For the information of future generations, we record the following. This church began to be built in May 1922 when Eastern Galicia was under Polish occupation and was renamed "Mytarivka." At that time, the parish priest of Mshanets was Father Aleksiy Berezhnytsky, originally from Berezhnytsia near Sambir, and the village head in Mshanets was Alexander Demyanovsky, a man who "had everything on his head," he transgressed and was deposed. The community built it willingly and with sincere hearts. The reason for the construction of this Church was that the old Church began to collapse, and it was already dangerous to gather inside. The community was compelled to start the construction, contributing materials from their forests. At the outset of the construction, they borrowed 2,000,000 marks (two million Polish marks) from an "American" from Halivka named Panteleimon Stets. Further funding for the construction was planned to be obtained from the sale of community forests and voluntary donations from citizens.

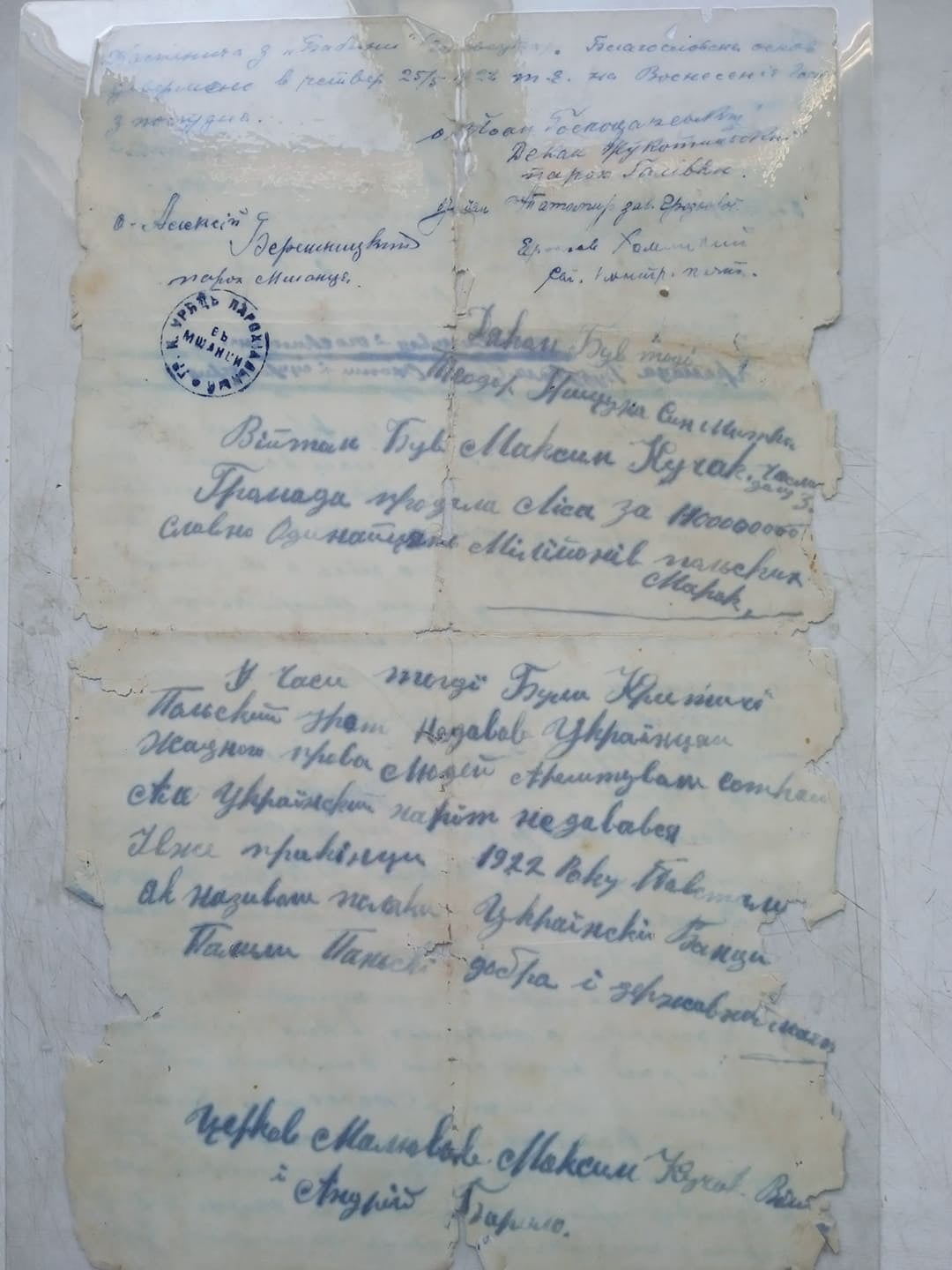
The note to future generations of Mshanets regarding the construction of the church in 1922 (2)

The builders for this Church were the master craftsmen from Tsyneva, Mr. Dolin, and Mr. Vasyl Mykhailiv. The committee selected for the construction of this Church consisted of: 1) Vasyl Vovkanych 2) Stefan Hrytsuna 3) Dmytro Parashchak 4) Ilko Stetskevych 5) Hnat Piznak Huyvanyiv. The craftsmen were contracted for two million Polish marks for the foundation, construction, and carpentry. The roofing, windows, and crosses at that time would cost around 6 million Polish marks because one cubic meter of sheet metal cost one million Polish marks.

The laying of the Foundation Stone and the construction were blessed by the then Archpriest of Zhukotyn, the Venerable Father Ivan Hospodarsky, parish priest in Halivka, with the participation of the Venerable Father Teodor Parashchak, parish priest from Holovetsko, and the native of Mshanets, Emilian Kalynych from Babyna in Holovetsko. The blessing of the foundation was completed on Thursday, May 25, 1922, that is, on Ascension Day at noon.

Fr. Oleksiy Berezhnytskyi - parish priest of Mshanets

Fr. Ivan Hospodarsky - Archpriest of Zhukotyn, parish priest of Halivka

Seal - "Parish Office in Mshanets"

Archpriest of Subatomir, Head of Hrozova - Yaroslav Khomynskyi

Below, the note is written in a different handwriting:

At that time, Theodor Hrytsuna, son of Milko, was the church diak. Maxim Kuchak was the vijt, residing at house number 3. The community sold the forest for 1100000000 Polish marks (eleven million Polish marks). The times were critical then. The Polish government granted no rights to Ukrainians. Hundreds of people were being arrested. But the Ukrainian people did not give up. By the end of 1922, the so-called Ukrainian Gangs revolted, as the Poles called them. They burned down noble estates and state-owned properties.

Maxim Kuchak, the mayor, painted the church.

Andriy Barylo.

In June 2023, as part of the preparation for the celebration of the 100th anniversary of the church, it was cleaned from old paint and repainted using special technology.

=== The Judgment Day Icon from Mshanets (1560s) ===
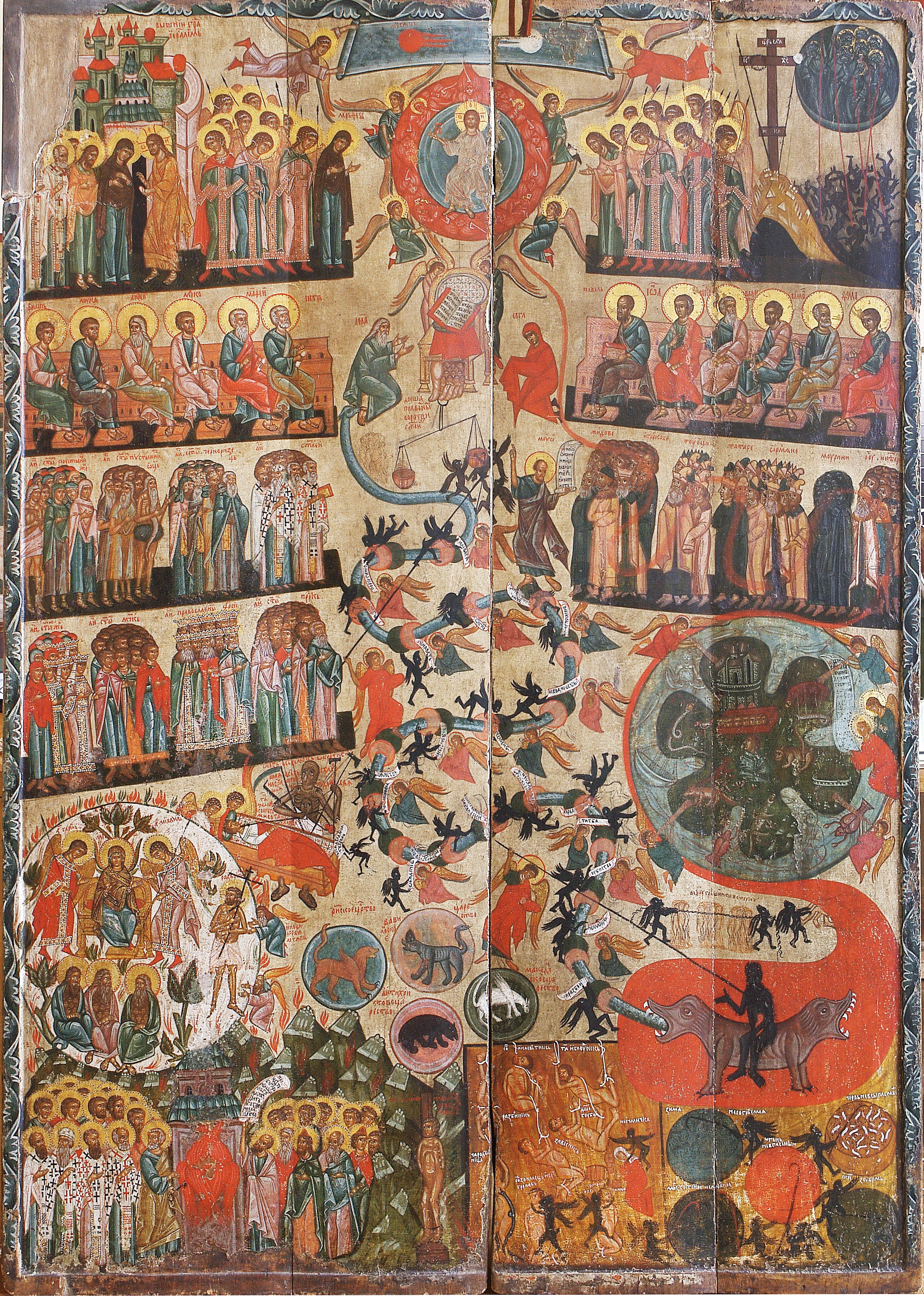
The Judgment Day icon from Mshanets, Lviv oblast, dating back to the 1560s, is housed in the Lviv National Museum named after Andrey Sheptytsky.

The Judgment Day icon from Mshanets, painted in the 1560s, is one of the oldest in Ukraine. (There is an even older similar icon from the village of Vanivtsi, but unlike the one from Mshanets, it is much more concise.) Both icons are monuments of the high artistic achievements of Ukrainian sacred art, marked by profound spirituality and mystical significance. They are currently housed in the Andrey Sheptytsky National Museum of Lviv.

The Mshanets icon features two unique moments that represent iconographic innovations by Ukrainian masters: the death of the righteous (on the right side of Christ's judgment, beneath the tiers of Paradise, lies a man on a bed under a red cover, next to him stands a tall, thin death figure with many faces on its body, holding spears, a scythe, and axes) and the woman-innkeeper ("korchmar") (the only clothed figure among the naked sinners; later, this motif will be further developed and will occupy a separate place in the iconography of hell motifs).

=== The Bell Tower of 1768 ===
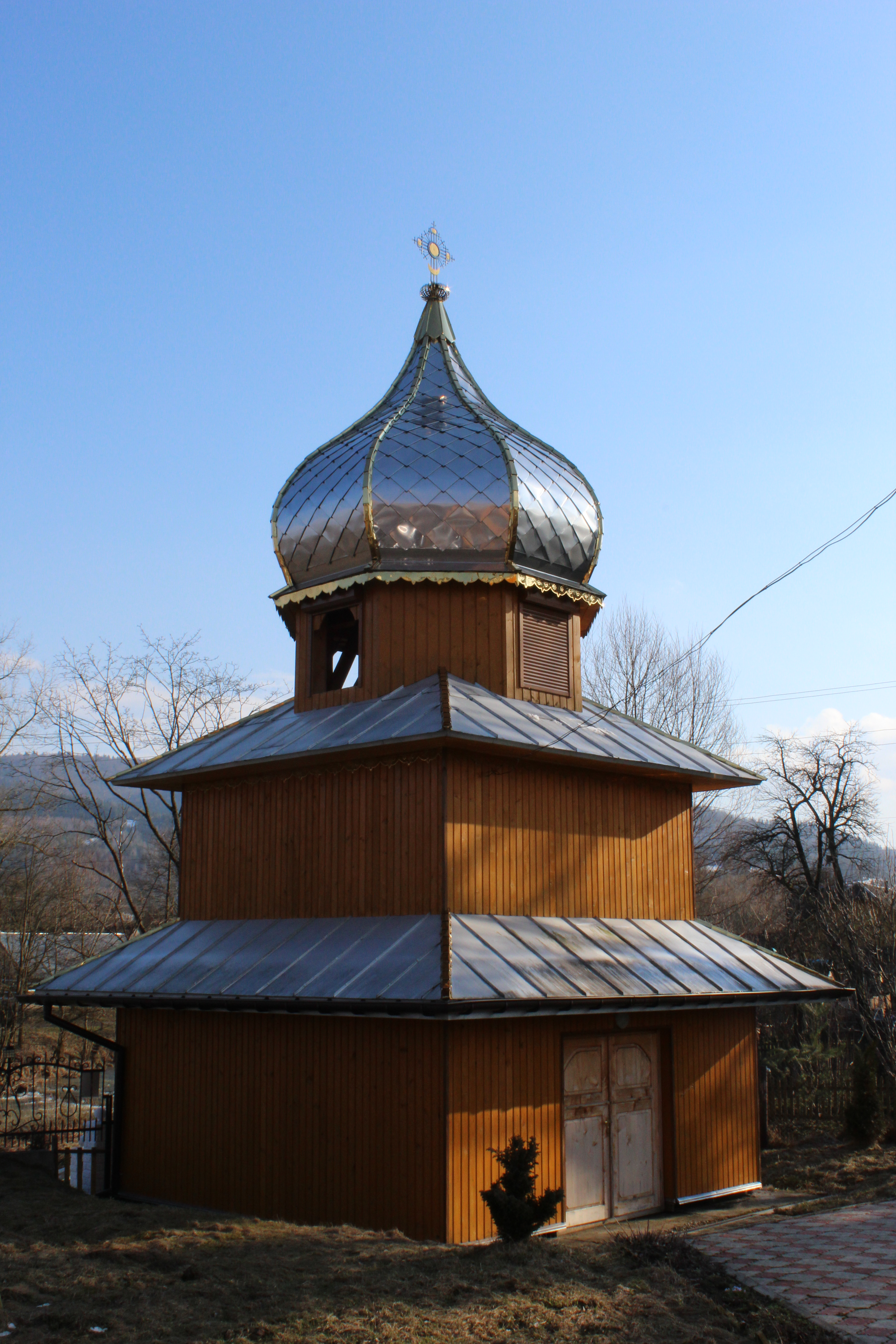
The two-tiered wooden bell tower of the 18th-century Church of the Nativity of the Blessed Virgin Mary in the village of Mshanets. Ukrainian Greek Catholic Church.

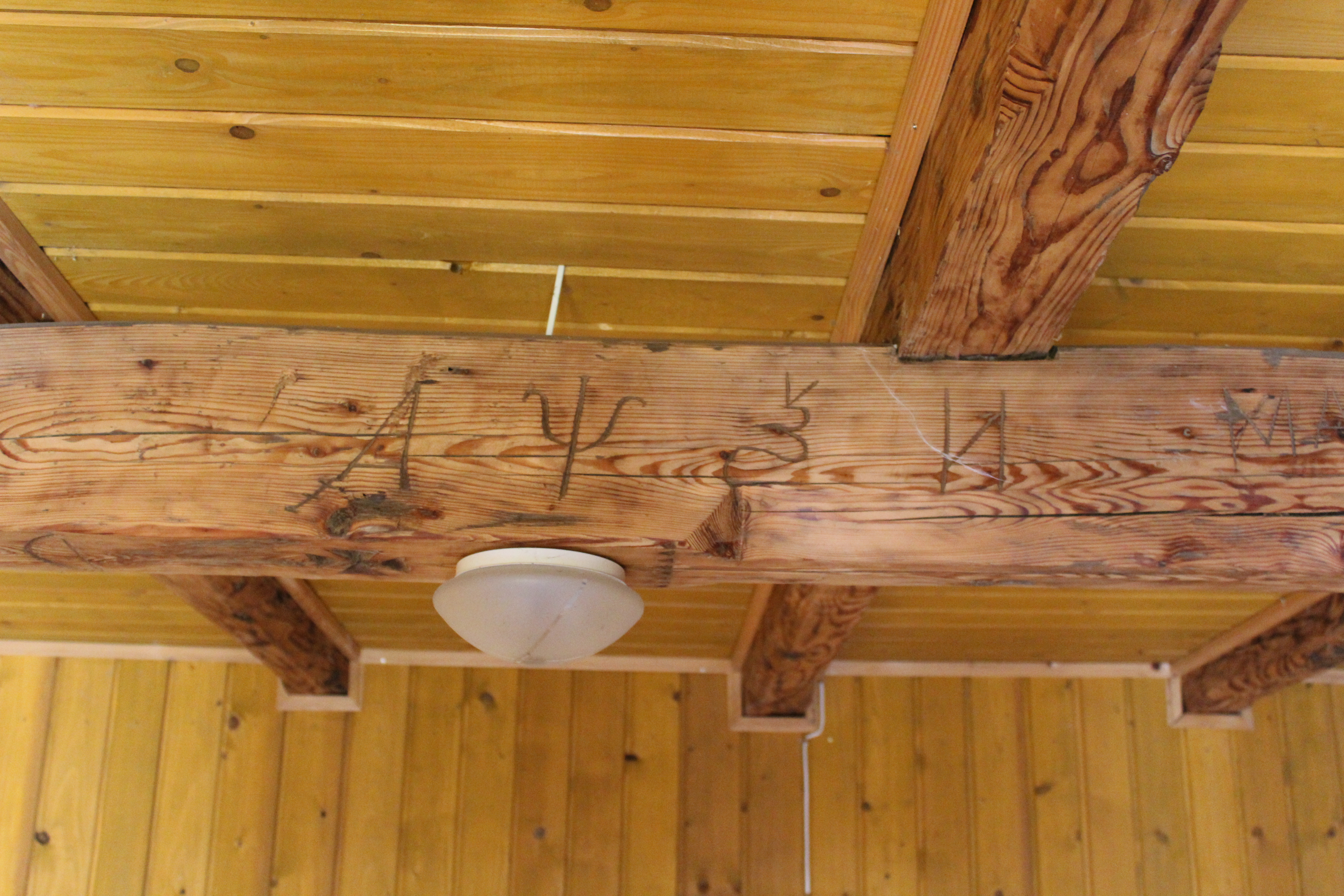
The inscription on the svolok in the two-tiered bell tower of the Church of the Nativity of the Blessed Virgin Mary in Mshanets reads: "In the Year of Our Lord 1768, Master Vasyl Shevak."

To the southwest of the church stands an architectural monument - a wooden two-tiered bell tower from the 18th century, transferred from the old church that stood on the eastern outskirts of the village. On the svolok in the passage of the bell tower, a carved inscription has been preserved: "In the year of God 1768, master Vasyl Shevak."

=== The sculpture of the Sorrowful Mother of Ukraine under the Cross, 1996. ===
In 1942, the community of the village of Mshanets erected a 4-meter earthen mound at this location in honor of the Ukrainian Sich Riflemen and the establishment of the Ukrainian Insurgent Army.

In 1975, the secretary of the collective farm's party organization, Roman Lesyk, personally demolished the rural monument with a bulldozer.

During the period of Independence, in 1996, Maria Fedorivna Vovkanich (Zamishchak) commissioned a unique statue of the Sorrowful Mother of God under the Cross from the renowned Lviv sculptor Mykola Posikira and financed its creation. The statue was solemnly consecrated on September 21, 1996, on the occasion of the village's 500th anniversary and in memory of all fighters for Ukraine's freedom. The location for installation was chosen with the assistance of the sculptor Mykola Posikira and the architect Mykhailo Fedyk.

=== Carol about Saint Sophia in Kyiv ===
1. And what was at the beginning of the world - [Glory to You, O God / throughout the world and in the heavens (refrain, repeated after each line)]
2. Oh, there was nothing but the bluewater.
3. Bluewater and a white stone.
4. But the Lord covered it with damp earth,
5. And on it grew a cedar tree,
6. Very tall and very beautiful.
7. The Holy Virgin saw it,
8. And called forty craftsmen to it:
9. "Oh, do you see, craftsmen?
10. And cut down the cedar tree,
11. Build for it Saint Sophia,
12. Saint Sophia in holy Kyiv.
13. Let there be seventy domes on it,
14. Seventy crosses, seventy crosses,
15. Seven doors, and one floor."
16. They worked by day, they fled by night,
17. They fled by night, they arrived by day.
18. And the Lord sent an angel from heaven.
19. "Do not be afraid, craftsmen!
20. The Lord has given you strength accordingly.
21. Make crosses, raise domes."
22. One dome, and very beautiful,
23. Very high and very beautiful,
24. And in that dome, a golden throne,
25. Behind that throne, the dear Lord Himself
26. Serves the cathedral service,
27. Cathedral service, for health,
28. And for the health of our brother,
29. Our brother and all Christians.
30. There lies an ancient path,
31. The Polish war walks along the path,
32. And among them walks the colonel.
33. The war began shooting at the crosses.
34. The colonel says:
35. "Do not shoot at the holy crosses,
36. For the Lord will send down a fiery rain.
37. A fiery rain, thunder bullets,
38. The Lord will drown the Polish war."
39. They did not listen, they shot at the crosses.
40. And it happened as he said:
41. The Lord sent down a fiery rain,
42. A fiery rain, thunder bullets,
43. The Lord drowned the Polish war,
44. Did not leave us the colonel,
45. The colonel, hey, our brother.
46. For health, for many years,
47. Hey, our mister, and our brother,
48. Not alone, but with the dear God,
49. With the dear God, with the mistress,
50. With the mistress and with the household.

This carol, recorded by Father Mykhailo Zubrytskyi from the host Mykhailo Olishchak Terletskyi in 1884, has become not just the subject of international scholarly debate but also evidence of the "reflected or encoded consciousness of ethnocultural unity of the Ukrainian people in all the territory of its settlement, including the presence of this consciousness, particularly in the Carpathian hinterlands" (Ukrainians had already been living in various empires for many centuries by that time.)

Ivan Franko began his first article about this carol with the observation: "What is most interesting about this carol is the mention of Kyiv and St. Sophia in such a distant and "board-up" locality, where the people nowadays hardly know anything about the existence of Kyiv, let alone St. Sophia" ("Significant carols", Kyiv Antiquity, 1889).

Russian professor and academician of the St. Petersburg Academy of Sciences, Alexander Vesselovsky, entered into a scholarly debate, dedicating research notes to the carol from Mshanets in the appendices to his work "Research in the Field of Russian Spiritual Verse" (1891), referring to it as interesting.

Engaging in a debate with the opinions of A. Vesselovsky regarding certain motifs of the carol, I. Franko presents his own observations in "Kievskaya Starina" and in the German-language article "How Slavic Mythology Was Created," published in the Vienna journal "Archiv fur Slavische Philologie" (1907, vol. 13).

In particular, in "Kievskaya Starina," he mentions a probable literary source for the motif presented in lines 30-45 - the miraculous defeat of the Polish army, which is a unique feature of the Mshanets carol, as it is not found in others. This refers to the miracle of 1601, described in the book "Klyuch Razumeniya" ("Key of Understanding") by Joannicius Galiatovsky, when the Polish army, along with the Germans, attacked the Pechersk Monastery and wanted to "destroy" it hearing that Zaporozhian Colonel Shulga was there with his knights, the Holy Virgin defended her monastery from danger by sending a "rain of fire" upon the Polish army. "Above that army, Butler and Zoltovsky were defeated."

Furthermore, Ivan Franko suggests that this passage from the book served as inspiration for the authors of the carol, as the book "Klyuch Razumeniya" was widely known among priests in the Carpathian Mountains. In 2023, as part of the "BoykoTravel" project, the existence of this book in the village of Velyka Volosianka, which is nearby and also belongs to the Strilky hromada, was proven. On August 15, 1668, a resident of this village, Stas Vasylkovych, and his wife Ohafiia donated the book "Klyuch Razumeniya" by Galiatovsky to the church. This book was published in Lviv at the printing house of Mykhailo Slyozka in 1665, as indicated by the inscription in the book's foreword.

Ivan Franko also analyzes this carol in his research "Carpathian-Rus' Literature of the 17th-18th Centuries," examines it in his unfinished work "History of Ukrainian Literature," and dedicates a separate chapter to it ("Carol about St. Sophia in Kyiv") in his famous "Studies on Ukrainian Folk Songs," where he summarizes his research on this work.

In 2022, Vadim Shevchuk, a member of the Kyiv Kobzar Guild and a bandurist, performed this carol in St. Sophia's Cathedral in Kyiv for the first time in centuries. However, not knowing the original melody, he composed his own.

On November 9, 2023, a film crew from the TV channel "1+1" arrived in Mshanets and Halivka to shoot a detective story about the Mshanets carol. On December 24, on the eve of the First Holy Evening in Ukraine according to the new style, the story about the detective history of this carol became central in the evening edition of "TSN" (Television News Service). The carol was performed live on Sophia Square in Kyiv by Tina Karol. This sparked a new stage of scholarly research.

Today, this carol is officially recognized as the oldest in Ukraine, being over 400 years old.

=== Contemporary verteps performed by children from Mshanets, Halivka, Ploske, and Vytsiv ===
2018: Vertep at the Mshanets Plebaniia (video). Text.
