= Halivka =

Village in Lviv Oblast, Ukraine

Coordinates: 49°21′44″N 22°46′39″E

Halivka (Ukrainian: Галівка) is a village in Ukraine, located in the Sambir Raion of the Lviv Oblast. The population is 97 people (as of 2021). The local self-government body is the Strilky Village Council.

== History ==
"In 1933, Volodymyr Kobilnyk conducted archaeological excavations near the Komarnytsya Caves (village of Oriv, Skole district), where a flint scraper from the Mesolithic period was found. Also, dating back to the same period, is a stone axe from the village of Halivka in the Dniester Valley, and a similar axe was accidentally found in the village of Zubrytsia in the valley of the Stryi River."

In 2023, the village became part of the network of historical and tourist routes "BoykoMandry" ("BoykoTravel") which is being created with the support of the Ukrainian Cultural Foundation (UKF) and the Strilkivska territorial community.

== Church of St. Archangel Michael ==
It was built in 1866 by an unknown master. This three-story building was crowned by three light octagons, covered with octagonal baths with one fold, crowned with large blind lanterns with crowns. It burned down in the 1980s.
