= Ploske, Lviv Oblast =

Village in Lviv Oblast, Ukraine

Coordinates: 49°20′52″N 22°48′02″E

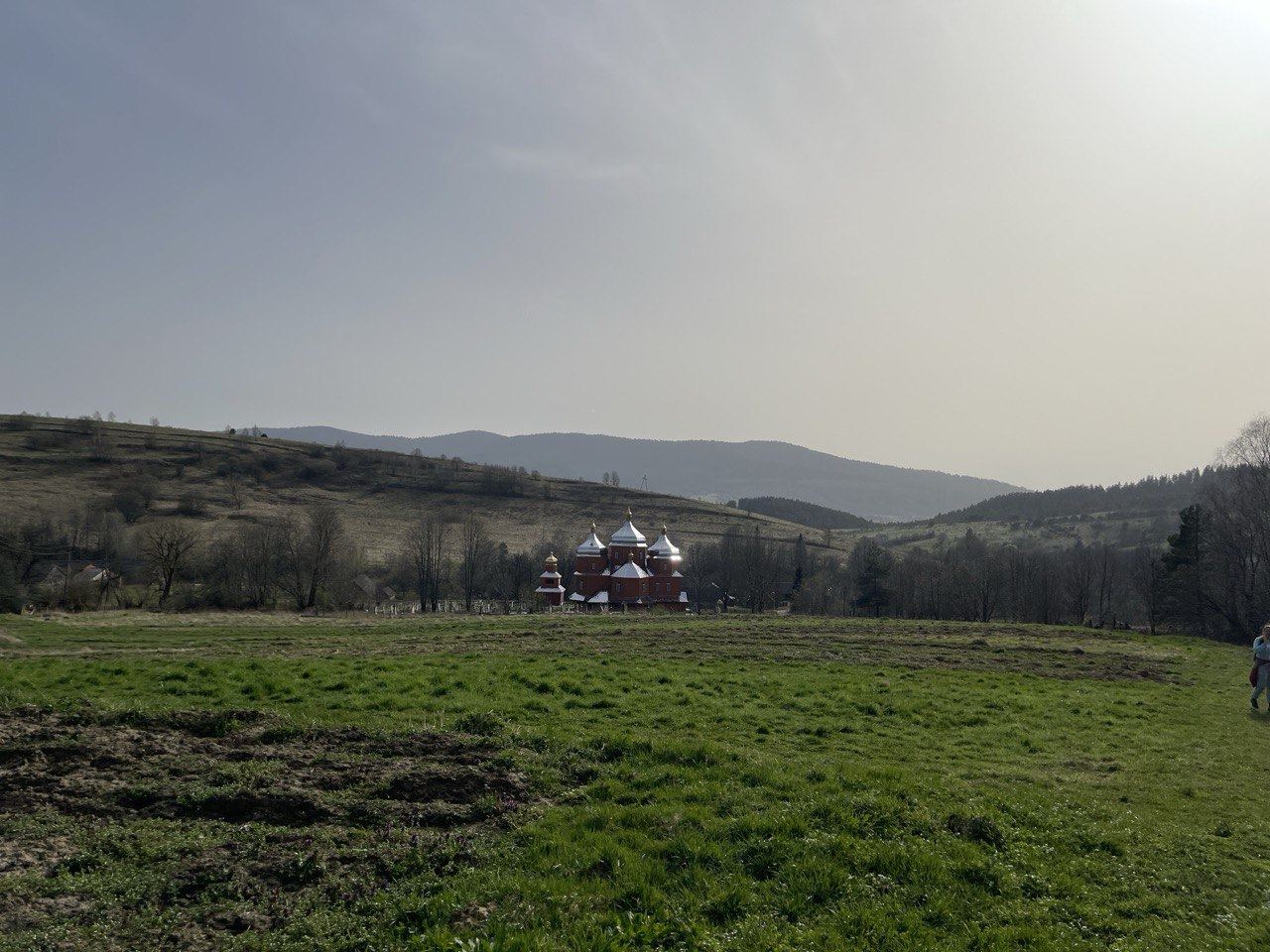
Ploske. Church of St. Archangel Michael (1903). Photo from the "BoykoMandra" project, 2024

Ploske (Ukrainian: Плоске) is a village in the Sambir Raion of the Lviv Oblast of Ukraine. As of 2023, the population is 149 people (75 as of 2023). The local self-government authority is the Strilky Village Council.

Ploske is situated on the southern slopes of the Orovyi (Vorovyi) Ridge, part of the Upper Dniester Beskids, within the Dniester river basin.

The village consists of two parts: Ploske and a hamlet called "Pid Orovym" ("Under Orovyi"), which is likely the highest hamlet in the Starosambir region.

Stretching from south to north between the mountains along the Ploske River, a small left tributary of the Mshanka River, which in turn is a tributary of the Dniester. The Ploske River collects water from the western half of the village, while the Sokil stream, a tributary of the Mshanka, collects water from the eastern half.

To the northeast of the village, there is a hill with an elevation of 703 meters, and to the south, there is the Cherteni hill with an elevation of 626 meters.

In 2023, the village of Ploske, together with surrounding villages, became part of the historical and tourist routes network "BoykoMandry," which is being created with the support of the Ukrainian Cultural Foundation and the Strilky territorial community. The main tourist attraction of the village is the Church of St. Archangel Michael of the UGCC, particularly its unconventional dome-shaped shelter.
