= Vytsiv =

Village in Lviv Oblast, Ukraine

Coordinates: 49°20′14″N 22°50′07″E

Vytsiv (Ukrainian: Виців) is a village in Ukraine, located in the Sambir Raion of the Lviv Oblast.

== Details ==
The population is 77 people (as of 2021). The local self-government body is the Strilky Village Council. In 2023, the village became part of the network of historical and tourist routes "BoykoMandry" ("BoykoTravel") which is being created with the support of the Ukrainian Cultural Foundation (UKF) and the Strilkivska territorial community.
