= Michniowiec =

- Village
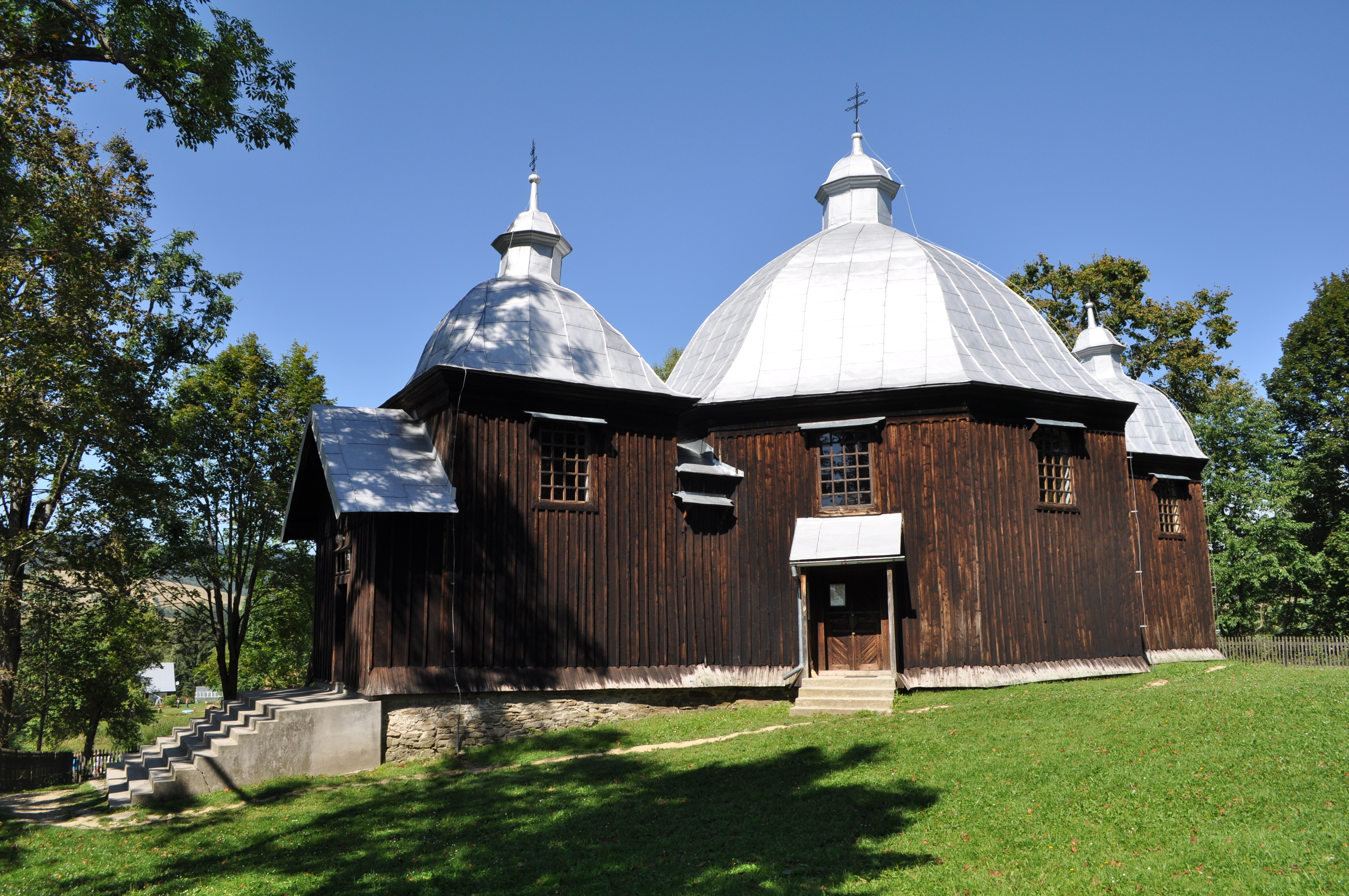
- Church in Michniowiec
- Interactive map of Michniowiec
- Location within Poland
- Coordinates: 49°18′5″N 22°43′53″E
- Country: Poland
- Voivodeship: Subcarpathian
- County: Bieszczady
- Gmina: Czarna
- Population: 170

Michniowiec [mʲixˈɲɔvʲɛt͡s] is a village in the administrative district of Gmina Czarna, within Bieszczady County, Subcarpathian Voivodeship, in south-eastern Poland, close to the border with Ukraine.
