= Berezhok (disambiguation) =

Berezhok is a village (selo) in Sambir Raion, Lviv Oblast, in south-west Ukraine.

Berezhok may also refer to the following rural localities in Russia:

- Berezhok, Kaduysky District, Vologda Oblast
- Berezhok, Kharovsky District, Vologda Oblast
- Berezhok, Totemsky District, Vologda Oblast
- Berezhok, Vologodsky District, Vologda Oblast

== Other uses ==
Berezhok is also a Russian modular weapons system for military vehicles, e.g. the BMP-3
