= Mykhailo Zubrytskyi =

Ukrainian priest and historian (1856–1919)

Father Mykhailo Zybrytskyi
- Михайло Зубрицький
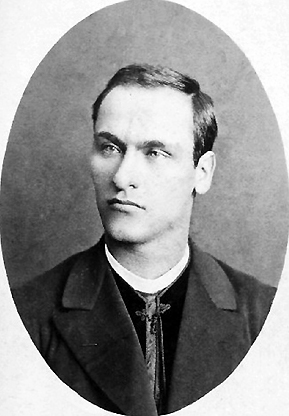
- Born: October 22, 1856; Kindrativ, Kingdom of Galicia and Lodomeria, Austro-Hungarian Empire (now Kindrativ, Sambir Raion, Lviv Oblast, Ukraine)
- Died: April 8, 1919 (aged 62); Berehy Dolishni, West Ukrainian People's Republic
- Education: Lviv University
- Occupations: Priest; ethnographer; folklorist; historian; public figure
- Relatives: Olga Borysevych (wife, died in 1942)

Ecclesiastical career
- Religion: Greek-Catholicism
- Church: Ukrainian Greek Catholic Church
- Writings: Village of Mshanets, Starosambirskyi povit. Materials on the history of the Galician village. Introduction and documents, 1906. Village of Mshanets, Starosambirskyi povit (part two), 1906. Big Family in Mshanets, Starosambir Povit, 1906. Materials on the Cultural History of Galician Rus in the 18th and 19th Centuries, Collected by Mykhailo Zubrytskyi, Yuriy Kmit, Ivan Kobyletskyy, Ivan E. Levytskyi, and Ivan Franko, 1902.

Father Mykhailo Zubrytskyi (October 22, 1856 – April 8, 1919) was a Greek Catholic priest, Ukrainian ethnographer, folklorist, historian, public figure (including participation in local self-governance in the West Ukrainian People's Republic), publicist, and member of the Shevchenko Scientific Society. Elected to the society on July 29, 1904, he was its only rural priest.

Zubrytskyi has been regarded as an early contributor to 20th-century scholarly approaches such as oral history and microhistory. He is considered the first scholar to make the life and customs of peasants the focus of systematic research; Mshanets, where he served for 31 years, has been described as one of the most extensively-studied villages in Central and Eastern Europe.

== Life ==
=== Family ===
Zubrytskyi was born on October 22, 1856, in the village of Kindrativ, now part of the Turka hromada in Lviv Oblast. His father, Ivan Zubrytsky, was a minor Pomian nobleman; his mother, Anastazia Nanivska, also came from a minor noble family associated with the house of Sas. Both of his parents were farmers. They married in 1831, and his father died on March 8, 1883.

Zubrytskyi's wife, Olga Borysevych (died 1942), was a rural schoolteacher. She was the daughter of Greek Catholic priest Ivan Borysevych (died 1900), a parish priest in Kryvcha (near the Sian) and dean of the Porokhnytsa deanery, and Sophia Nazarevych. Olga was the granddaughter of Greek Catholic priest Antoniy Nazarevych (died 1893) and Julia Lishchynska, and the great-granddaughter of Greek Catholic priest Petro Nazarevych (died 1834) and Maria Sozanska. She was educated in Peremyshl. Zubrytskyi and Olga married on September 27, 1883, and had four children.

=== Education ===
Zubrytskyi began studying in Turka in fall 1866, and later studied for two years in Rozbir.

==== Drohobych Gymnasium ====
In fall 1868, Zubrytskyi began third grade at the primary school in Drohobych. He began studying at the Drohobych Gymnasium in 1870, where he met Ivan Franko and began a lifelong friendship. Franko wrote in an April 11, 1875 to Shchasnyi Selskyi,

"Our Ruthenian affairs at the Drohobych Gymnasium, as usual, are very weak. Apart from three poor Ukrainians, not a single student is interested in either literary or political Ruthenian affairs. You might be interested to know who these three are—so I tell you that Matkovskyi, you probably know from the eighth grade, Zubrytskyi from the fifth, and the third is writing to you. Certainly, it is not a good testament to our Ukrainians, but what can be done?"

Influenced in part by Franko, Zubrytskyi developed an interest in historical manuscripts. As a student, he examined an 18th-century manuscript collection in a local household; Franko cited this discovery in his article, "Contributions to the History of Ruthenian Literature of the 18th Century" (1886). Zubrytskyi also collected songs and folklore from his native Kindrativ and nearby villages (such as Yasinka and Rozbir), and shared the recordings with Omelyan Partatskyi, Omelyan Ohonovskyi, and other contemporary Galician scholars.

==== Seminary ====
Zubrytskyi intended to study philosophy at the University of Lviv, but enrolled in the faculty of theology. He studied at seminaries in Lviv (1879–1883) and Peremyshl. Zubrytskyi became interested in research, and wrote his first study on serfdom in the 13th century. He married Olha Borysevych, the granddaughter of a priest from Mshanets near Staryi Sambir (where he became parish priest). Zubrytskyi spent most of his life in Mshanets, combining pastoral duties with historigraphy and ethnography. Before assuming his position in Mshanets in 1883, he spent a year teaching at the Diak Institute in Peremyshl.

=== Activity in Mshanets (1883–1914) ===
On November 17, 1883, Zubrytskyi became parish priest in the village of Mshanets (now in the Sambir raion of Lviv Oblast), where he served until April 25, 1914. He opposed the assimilationist policies of foreign authorities towards Ruthenians.

==== Educational activities ====
A "reader's revolution" took place in the village; Zubrytskyi taught the peasants to read, and instilled in them an interest in reading. Prosvita reading rooms were founded in Mshanets (February 28, 1892), Hrozova (April 2, 1893), Mykhnovets (April 11, 1893), Lavriv (1894), Limna (July 26, 1901), Holovetsko (1902), and Lypia (1902).

Zubrytskyi criticized the telling of Polish stories to Ukrainian children. He called for the school curriculum to broaden the peasants' view of nature, to instill dignity in them (not submitting to the elite), and for schools to teach young people to seek a way of life through independent work. Zubrytskyi promoted the children's magazine Dzvinok to parents and educators, saying that it was better for children than toys, and reported on the mass-market publication of works on Ukrainian history. He believed that children's names should reflect Ukrainian traditionalism and patriotism.

He tried to instill in his fellow priests an understanding of the need for everyday work with people and education, especially in children of school age, fostering awareness of national unity and personal responsibility for all Ukrainians. Zubrytskyi wrote a number of works which strengthened the Ukrainian Greek Catholic Church as a force for independence.

==== Pastoral activities ====
Zubrytskyi wrote in 1901, "I am a priest and fulfill my duties from inner conviction." He encouraged congregational singing and incorporated literacy education into religious instruction.

==== Protection of the Ukrainian (Ruthenian) language ====
Zubrytskyi defended the Ukrainian language in education, social, political, and cultural life, opposing neglect of the language by government officials and others. He opposed the Polonization of place names, and supported spelling reform and official status for the Ukrainian language.

==== Human rights ====
Zubrytskyi defended the dignity of his parishioners. He saw the results of the Austrian regime, including covert and overt violations of rights guaranteed by legislation. Zubrytskyi criticized unfair treatment of peoples in the Habsburg Empire, the exploitation of Galician peasantry by industrial parts of Austria, discrimination against native teachers, predatory deforestation, impunity by landlords and officials, tax manipulation, misrepresentation of the population in county councils, police surveillance of the intelligentsia, extortion, harsh conscription, and forced begging.

==== Economic development ====
Zubrytskyi addressed economic and political discrimination against the Ruthenians. He told the intelligentsia that they should work with the people, bringing them "the light of truth and knowledge in their native Ruthenian attire." Zubrytskyi supported the Galician Rural Farmer organization (founded in 1899), and defended its members against attacks and discrimination. He promoted the cooperative movement, especially rural cooperative stores which reduced the economic exploitation of peasants by innkeepers, speculators, and usurers. He understood that the serfdom imposed on Ukrainian peasants was a form of colonial oppression.

==== Scientific activity ====
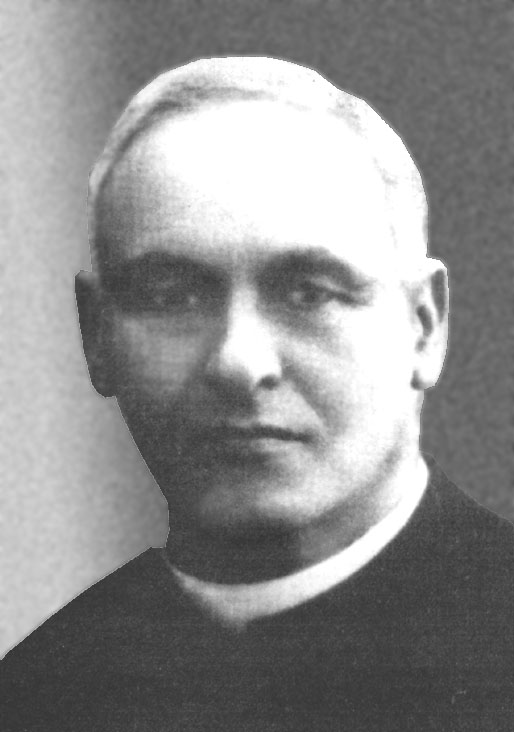
Zubrytskyi in later life

Zubrytskyi wrote about Boyko villages in the context of current affairs, and was influenced by Ivan Franko. He said that during the founding of Saint Petersburg, 20,000 Ukrainian Cossacks died. His writings about Poland's annexation of Galicia and other regions of Ukraine was censored. Franko called Zubrytskyi a "distinguished Ukrainian historian and ethnographer," "an expert on the western mountainous Boykivshchyna," and "a distinguished researcher of peasant life", praising the accuracy and integrity of his work and citing Zubrytskyi's ethnographic and folkloric material in his own.

On July 20, 1904, Zubrytskyi became a full member of the Shevchenko Scientific Society. The society's bookstore in Lviv was selling five books by Zubrytskyi in 1912. In spring 1913, he purchased 78 items in the Boyko region (including tools for processing flax, hemp, and weaving fabric) and donated them to the society's museum in Lviv.

==== Political activity ====
Zubrytskyi used national liberation movements in other countries to raise political awareness among his fellow countrymen, and ridiculed the absurdity of Poland's right to rule Ukrainian lands. He participated in politics in the Boyko regions, standing as a candidate for local county councils and the Galician Sejm. Zubrytskyi fought against Moscophilia, illustrating its absurdity. Zubrytskyi studied the work of the Ukrainian Radical Party, but its orientation towards Marxism was unacceptable to him and he condemned the apostasy of the Moscophils. He considered himself and other like-minded individuals Ukrainophiles, and declared in March 1901 that he and his associates were nationalists. Zubrytskyi promoted the popular-assembly movement in western Boykivshchyna, despite resistance from a pro-Austrian and Polish bureaucracy which tried to suppress assemblies.

==== Campaigns against alcohol and usury ====
Zubrytskyi fought against drunkenness, exposing the harm of alcoholism and popularizing organized resistance against owners of the monopoly right to produce and sell alcoholic beverages. He banned the church vertep (puppet nativity scene) because of the drunkenness of its participants, allowing two to four godparents at a baptism instead of 15-20, and forbade giving horilka to midwives. In 1894, Zubrytsky noted that the consumption of vodka and horlika had decreased substantially. He also resisted the spread of usury in the villages.

=== Arrest and exile (1914–1916) ===
Arrested on September 7, 1914, by the Austrian police on charges of Moscophil views, he served his exile in Thalerhof and Slovenia.

=== Activity in Berehy Dolishni (1916–1919) ===
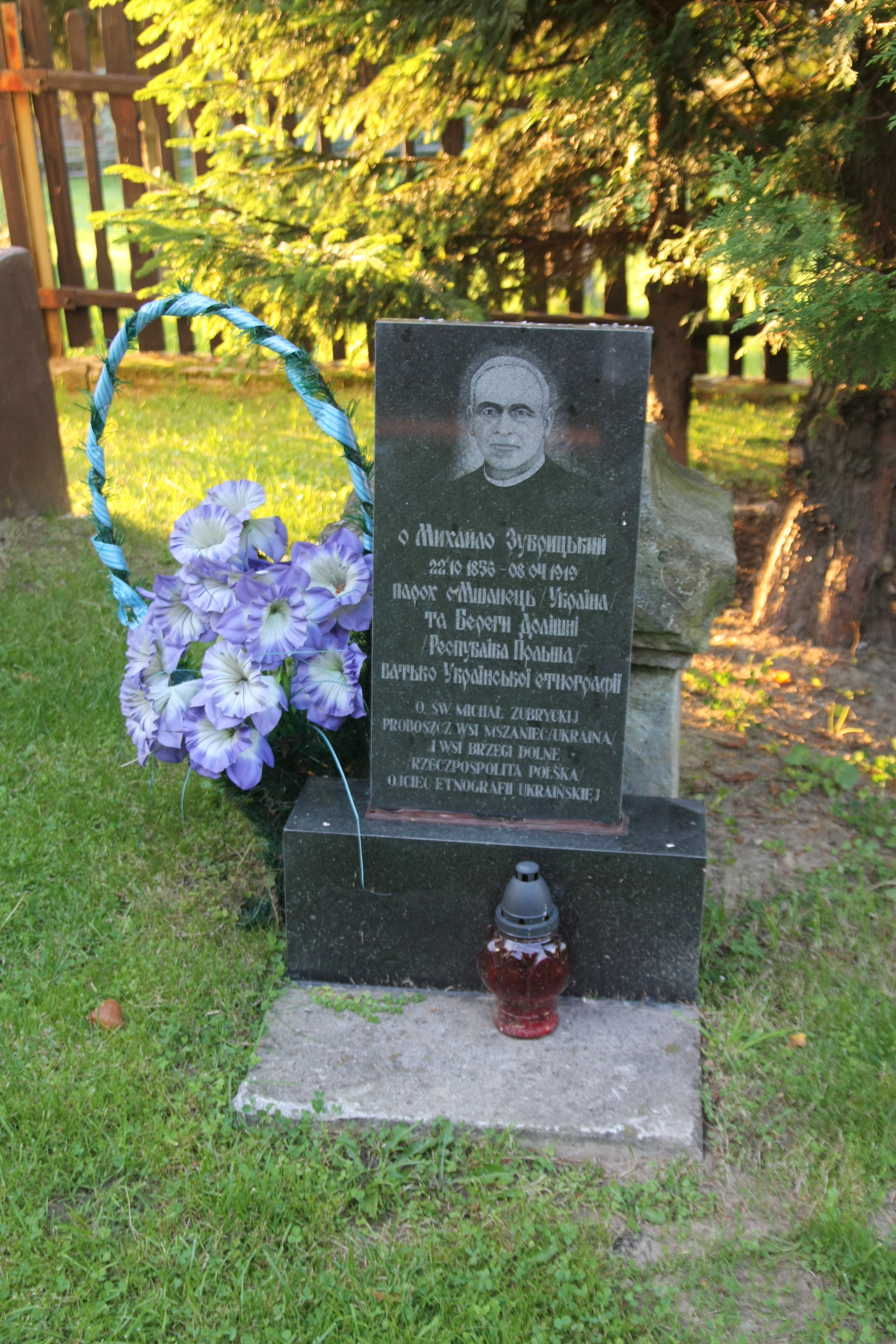
Zubrytskyi's grave in a churchyard

Zubrytskyi began working in 1916 in the village of Berehy Dolishni, where he witnessed events related to the November 1918 formation of the West Ukrainian People's Republic (ZUNR). He organized assistance to Ukrainian military units with many of his parishioners, and welcomed the formation of the ZUNR. Zubrytskyi was arrested a second time by the Polish police on November 25, 1918, and fell ill. After torture, he died on April 8, 1919, in Berehy Dolishni and was buried near a church which is now Catholic.

== Legacy ==
Zubrytskyi studied the history and folklore of his region. He wrote over 360 works exploring the life and customs of 18th- and 19th-century Boyko peasants, including 220 newspaper articles. Zubrytskyi was interested in the economic affairs of the inhabitants of surrounding villages, social structures which varied from village to village, and land ownership. The oldest document in his collection dates back to the 17th century.

Zubrytskyi also wrote about current events (including a cholera epidemic and the spread of tobacco), and collected Ukrainian folk songs, stories, legends, and proverbs. He published articles in Dilo, Bat'kivshchyna, Zoria, and Zapysky Naukovoho Tovarystva imeni Shevchenka (Proceedings of the Shevchenko Scientific Society).

== Works about Zubrytskyi ==
- Nataliia Klyashtorna. "The Mission of Father Zubrytsky". Local History. February 11, 2022.
- Maria Orynchak. "In Miniature, He Did What Sheptytsky Introduced Throughout the Church: Who Was Father Mykhailo Zubrytskyi?" Lviv News Manufacture. November 4, 2022.
- V. P. Shvydkyj. Zubrytskyi Mykhailo Ivanovych (2005)
- R. F. Kyrchiv.
- Roman Kyrchiv, "Mykhailo Zubrytskyi's Connections with Ivan Franko and Volodymyr Hnatiuk". 3-4 2008 National Studies Notebooks (Narodoznavchi Zoshyty), pp. 373–377.
- Hanna Horyn, "Mykhailo Zubrytskyi's Scientific Work in the Dimensions of Time". 3-4 2008 National Studies Notebooks, pp. 378–381.
- Yaroslav Taras, "Mykhailo Zubrytskyi in the History of the Church in the Village of Mshanets". 3-4 2008 National Studies Notebooks, pp. 382–391.
- Stefaniya Hvozdevych, "Mykhailo Zubrytskyi - Researcher of Family and Family Rituals of the Boykos". 3-4 2008 National Studies Notebooks, pp. 392–396.
- Hanna Sokil, "From the Works of Mykhailo Zubrytskyi, Folklorist". 3-4 2008 National Studies Notebooks, pp. 397–402.
- Vira Lisak, "The Use of Mykhailo Zubrytskyi's 'People's Calendar' in Modern Schools". National Studies Notebooks, pp. 402–403.
- Petro Zborovsky, "Turka Region in the Life and Scientific Works of Mykhailo Zubrytskyi". Ethnographic Notebooks, March–April 2008, pp. 404–408.
- Roman Radovych, "Customs and Rituals Associated with the Construction of Dwellings in the Western Galician Boyko Region (Based on Materials from the Turka and Starosambir Districts)". National Studies Notebooks, March–April 2008, pp. 253–271.
- Hryhoriy Demyan, "The National and State-Oriented Activities of Mykhailo Zubrytskyi (Thematic-Bibliographic Review of Publications)". National Studies Notebooks, March–April 2008, pp. 358–372.
