= Strilky rural hromada =

Hromada of Lviv Oblast (Ukraine)

Strilky rural hromada Стрілківська сільська громада
- Hromada
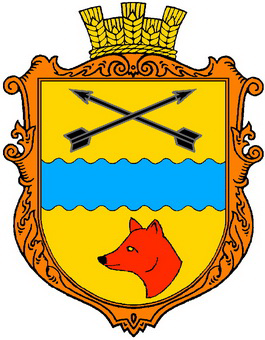
- Seal
- Interactive map of Strilky rural hromada
- Country: Ukraine
- Oblast: Lviv Oblast
- Raion: Sambir Raion
- Admin. center: Strilky

Government
  - Head of hromada: Mykola Drozd

Area
  - Total: 327.4 km^{2} (126.4 sq mi)

Population (2021)
  - Total: 14,470
  - Density: 44.20/km^{2} (114.5/sq mi)
- CATOTTG code: UA46080170000064605
- Settlements: 21
- Villages: 21
- Website: strilky-gromada.gov.ua

The Strilky rural hromada is a mountainous rural hromada in Sambir Raion, Lviv Oblast, Ukraine. Located in the western part of the Sambir Raion, its territory is entirely within the Upper Dniester Beskids (Carpathian Mountains), covering an area of 327.4 km^{2} (9.9% of the raion's area). The community comprises 21 villages with a population of 14, 470 residents (6.2% of the raion's population), and 10,822 adults.

It borders the Staryi Sambir urban hromada to the north, the Turka urban hromada to the south, the Skhidnytsia urban hromada of the Drohobych Raion to the east, and the Republic of Poland to the west. The hromada was recently established, at the end of 2020.

On the territory of the Strilky hromada are the Royal Beskids National Nature Park and the "Upper Dniester Beskids" Regional Landscape Park.

Formed based on the Cabinet of Ministers of Ukraine decree dated June 12, 2020, 'On determining administrative centers and approving the territories of territorial hromadas.' The first elections of the village head and village council deputies took place on October 25, 2020. The first solemn meeting was held on November 26, 2020.

The governing body is the Strilky village council.

Council address: Ukraine, 82092, Lviv Oblast, Sambir Raion, Strilky, o. M. Verbicky Street, 10. KATO code: UA46080170000064605.

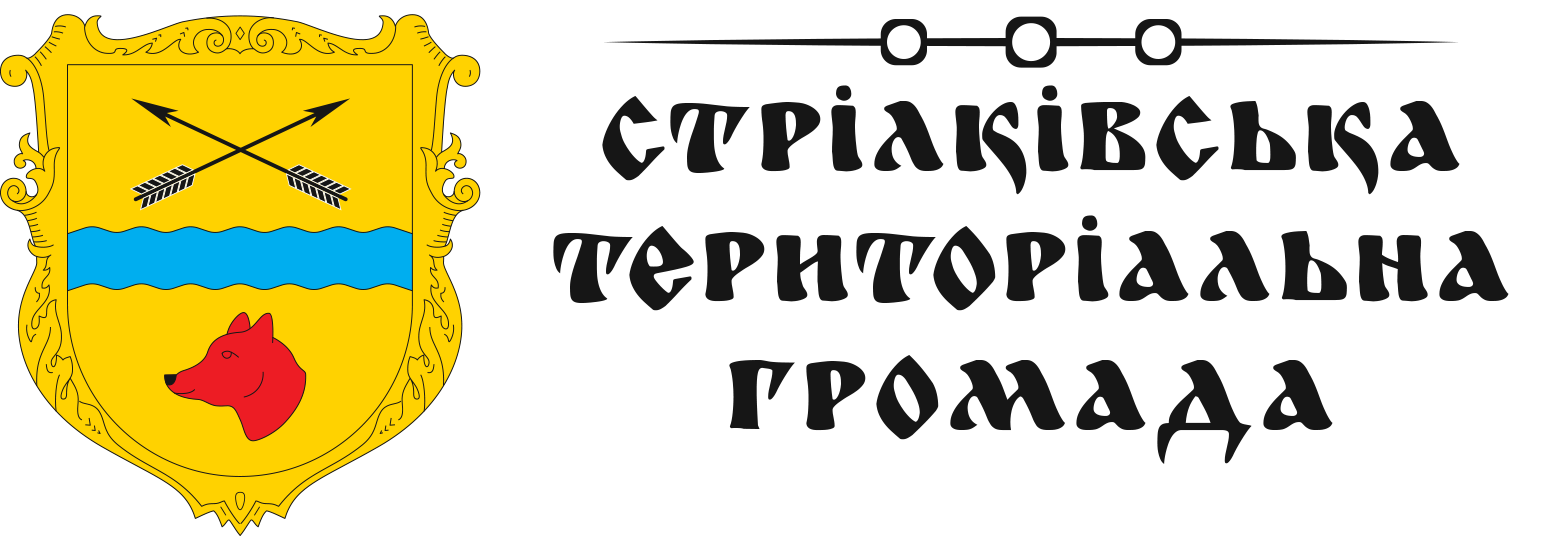
Official logo of Strilky hromada

== Hromada composition ==
The hromada consists of 21 villages (all with mountainous status):

Hromada Center

1. Strilky (2,333)

Starosta Vasyl Mykhailovych Hrytsak:

1. Babyno (377)
2. Vytsiv (77)
3. Halivka (97)
4. Hvozdets (94)
5. Holovetsko (1,058)
6. Hrozovo (609)
7. Dnistryk (310)
8. Mshanets (296)
9. Ploske (149)
10. Ripiana (630)
11. Smerechka (267)

Starosta Volodymyr Romanovych Chuplak:

1. Busovysko (949)
2. Verkhnii Luzhok (1,167)

Starosta Tetiana Ivanivna Demian:

1. Velyka Volosianka (329)
2. Lopushanka-Khomyna (495)
3. Tysovytsia (592)
4. Yasenytsia-Zamkova (1,270)

Staorsta Lesya Yaroslavivna Nalyvaiko:

1. Nedilna (197)
2. Topilnytsia (1,473)
3. Turie (1,225)

== Population ==
In 2021, the hromada had a population of 13,994 people (males - 6,829, females - 7,165). Age distribution: up to 15 years - 2,338, 16–59 years - 8,431, 60 years and older - 3,321.

== History ==
The hromada is situated in a picturesque area in the Carpathians, within the Upper Dniester Beskids, in the region known as Boikivshchyna.

It's difficult to determine when the first settlements were founded here, but there is reliable evidence of the existence of a Rus hillfort on Mount Magura as far back as the 11th-13th centuries, along with other castles on mountain peaks dating back to the times of Kievan Rus.

During that period, hillforts were strategically built on heights to create a defensive network and quickly transmit danger signals using a system of bonfires. Today, mobile towers stand in the locations of ancient hillforts and castles.

The famous "Rus Road" (more precisely, a network of trade routes) passed through these mountains.

Starting from the 15th century, the first written mentions of these villages in their modern locations have been preserved: Busovysko – 13th century, Babyna – 1407, Strilky – 1437, Mshanets – 1446, Turie – 1473, Hrozova – 1492.

There was never serfdom here, which significantly influenced the character of the local residents. The villages had "Vlach law" (or "shepherd law"): the villagers freely used the land and pastures under the authority of community elders (initially called "knyaz" and later "viyt" and "soltys"). The elders paid taxes to the royal treasury, determined who would go to the army (at that time – the Austrian army), and, crucially, had their own court.

Thanks to Father Mykhailo Zubrytskyi, a priest and scholar who served in the village of Mshanets for 30 years, a wealth of unique information (and artifacts) about the history of these villages has been preserved. This includes details about the system of community justice, which is truly an interesting 'case' and a brick in understanding the local mentality and the community's ability to resolve matters. Very rarely did legal cases escalate to higher authorities.

The system worked as follows: the headman ("viyt"), through a sworn juror (community policeman), summoned people. The most important feature was that anyone who came to court, regardless of whether they belonged to the 'council,' participated, and decisions were made collectively. The plaintiff would place 5-10-20 Austrian gold guilders on the table and command, "My five, ten under forfeiture, if this is proven against me!" The defendant was obliged to provide evidence (if, before that, he publicly accused the plaintiff of some dishonest act). If he proved it, the money placed on the table was forfeited, but if not, he had to pay the same amount that the plaintiff had put on the table. Officials ("kraynyky") usually confirmed the community's decision, and often ordered the jurors and headmen from other communities to go to Mshanets and settle disputes.

The system of punishment was also interesting when people were seated on a wooden horse in the yard of one of the landlords for guilt.

In the second half of the 19th century, the situation with alcohol in these villages was simply sad. People drank everything: fields, houses, remnant – everything was left in the tavern. In the evening, you couldn't walk through the village without stumbling upon a brawl. Moonshine was the main drink at lunches, weddings, funerals, in agreements of buying and selling, for example, sheep, and so on. Only during Christmas holidays did the village spend as much on moonshine as the annual salary of the priest.

But during this time, thanks to young Greek-Catholic priests, the situation changed drastically. In 20 years, they managed to sober up the people. Of course, they also made mortal enemies – local Jewish tavern keepers.

=== Full-scale Invasion of 2022 ===
Because of the full-scale invasion by the Russian Federation into Ukraine on February 24, 2022, 4975 internally displaced persons arrived in the Strilky rural hromada, making it one of the most vulnerable areas in Ukraine (located near Poland in a mountainous region). As of January 2023, 319 internally displaced persons remain in the hromada. The gender distribution has remained relatively consistent throughout the year: women - 49.2%, children - 29.8%, men - 21%. A coordinating team was urgently established to receive and settle internally displaced persons (IDPs), including women, children, and non-mobilized men. The most active volunteer centers were organized by women from the villages of Mshanets, Ploske, and Lopushanka-Khomyna. They gathered fellow villagers and refurbished vacant houses for free temporary accommodation of IDPs.

Additionally, a humanitarian aid distribution point (including food, especially for children, clothing, hygiene products) was set up at the village council office. Significant assistance was provided by the Polish municipality of Dobrzeń Wielki (medicines, pain relievers, clothing, hygiene products, sleeping bags, camping mats, a petrol generator, flashlights, binoculars, fabric for making backpacks), as well as numerous international partners, volunteers, charitable organizations, etc.

For two large families from Hostomel and Sumy, with the help of assistance from the Ukrainian Catholic University and international benefactors, two houses were purchased in the village of Mshanets. For long-term residence of internally displaced persons (IDPs), repairs have been made to the closed elementary school in the village of Holovetske (Zolotnivets hamlet), a sewage system has been installed, and the water supply system has been repaired.

During the summer of 2022, rehabilitation camps with psychological support were organized for children and adolescents who had suffered from the war on the premises of the social enterprise "Mshanetski Kolyby" in the village of Mshanets.

=== "BoykoMandry" project ===
In 2023, with the support of the Ukrainian Cultural Fundation and the local budget, the local NGO "Mahura" created a network of interactive cultural and educational routes called "BoykoMandry" ("BoykoTravel") in the territory of the Strilky hromada. The goal of the project is to revitalize, popularize, and imbue the Boyko cultural heritage with new meanings. The routes lead to historical and cultural tourist locations revealing unique "cases" of local history to travelers "along the way."

== Geography ==
The hromada is situated in the basin of the Dniester River, more precisely in its source. It is located in the southwestern part of the Lviv Oblast, where its western boundaries coincide with the state border of Ukraine and the Republic of Poland. The hromada shares borders with the Staryi Sambir urban hromada to the north, the Turka urban hromada to the south, and the Pidbuzh settlement hromada of Drohobych Raion to the east.

The entire hromada is situated in the massif of the Upper Dniester Beskids (Carpathians). Two natural parks, the Regional Landscape Park "Upper Dniester Beskids" and the National Natural Park "Royal Beskids," partially cover the territory of the hromada.

The hromada is located in the foothills of the Outer Carpathians and the San-Dniester watershed elevation, within the basins of the Black and Baltic Seas. It is part of two physiogeographic zones: the Subcarpathians and the Ukrainian Carpathians, which are called the Beskids in this region. These mountains are formed from flysch, sandstones, shales, and various mountain rocks. The solid rocks, which are less prone to erosion, form elevated sharp relief features, while less resistant rocks, which erode more quickly, create softer, rounded relief forms, resulting in many peaks and depressions in the mountainous area.

The mountainous relief is characterized by the rounded forms of the Carpathian ridges, whose peaks reach 800 meters and more above sea level. The highest peak is Mount Magura-Limnianska, located near the village of Hrozovo, rising to 1022 meters above sea level.

The hromada is located in a zone with an Atlantic-continental climate, characterized by low pressure, high air humidity, and cool summers. This transitional climate characteristic is influenced by the geographical location of the territory at the crossroads of migration paths of air masses, as well as the specific features of its surface (presence of marshy plains, sandy areas, plateaus, and mountains).

The geographical latitude of the region allows for the incidence of solar radiation at an average angle of 41°, observed during noon in the spring and autumn equinoxes. The maximum angle of solar radiation is reached during the summer solstice (62°), and the minimum during the winter solstice (17°).

== Economy ==
The hromada hosts 40 enterprises, including 15 private enterprises, 15 limited liability companies, 3 farms, 1 communal enterprise, 4 agricultural cooperatives, 1 consumer cooperative, and 1 law firm.

The most prevalent types of activities are wholesale and retail trade, logging, and wood processing. Additionally, there are enterprises engaged in:

- Electrical installation works
- Electricity production
- Telecommunications
- Repair of household electronic equipment for receiving, recording, and reproducing sound and images
- Construction of residential and non-residential buildings
- Rental of construction machinery and equipment
- Production of underwear
- Manufacturing of paper products for household and sanitary-hygienic purposes
- Milk processing and cheese production
- Flour-milling and cereal production
- Manufacturing of products from bark, straw, and plant materials for weaving
- Travel organization services

Due to the specific mountainous soils, traditional agriculture in the hromada is not as effective as in other regions of Ukraine. However, the hromada provides favorable conditions for industrial cultivation of blueberries, blackberries, hazelnuts, strawberries, wild strawberries, sea buckthorn, lavender, and more. Thanks to its natural location, the hromada has significant tourist potential. Developing a strategy for socio-economic development, the focus is on green and agritourism, along with cultural, historical, and sports tourism. The first successful steps in this direction have already been taken.

== Tourist Infrastructure ==
=== Leisure and Recreational Establishments ===
- Social Entrepreneurship of the Local Religious Community of the UGCC "Mshanetski Kolyby" (Mshanets Village).
- Restaurant and Leisure Complex "Striletskyi Zamok" (Strilky Village).
- Retreat Center of the Sambir-Drohobych Eparchy UGCC "Emmaus" (Strilky Village).
- Tourist Camping "Boikivsky Dvir" (Yasenitsia-Zamkova Village).
- Ecological Homestead 'Kaskad' (Velyka Volosianka Village).
- Ethno-Homestead 'Yasna Sadyba' (Yasenitsia-Zamkova Village).
- Ecological Homestead 'Beskydy' (Velyka Volosianka Village).
- Agrarian settlement "Rostoky" (Nedilna Village).
- Private estate Villa "Maria" (Turie Village).
- Modular house "Magic of Silence" (Lopushanka-Khomyna village).

=== Museums ===
- Ethnographic Museum of Father Mykhailo Zubrytsky in Mshanets village.
- Museum of Ivan Platok in Halivka village.
- Museum at the Bell Tower of the Church of St. Archangel Michael (1730) in Yasenytsia-Zamkova village.
- Historical and Memorial Museum of Kyrylo Osmak, head of the Ukrainian Main Liberation Council, in Nedilna village.
- "Nanashkova hut" in Lopushanka-Khomyna village.

=== Architectural landmarks ===
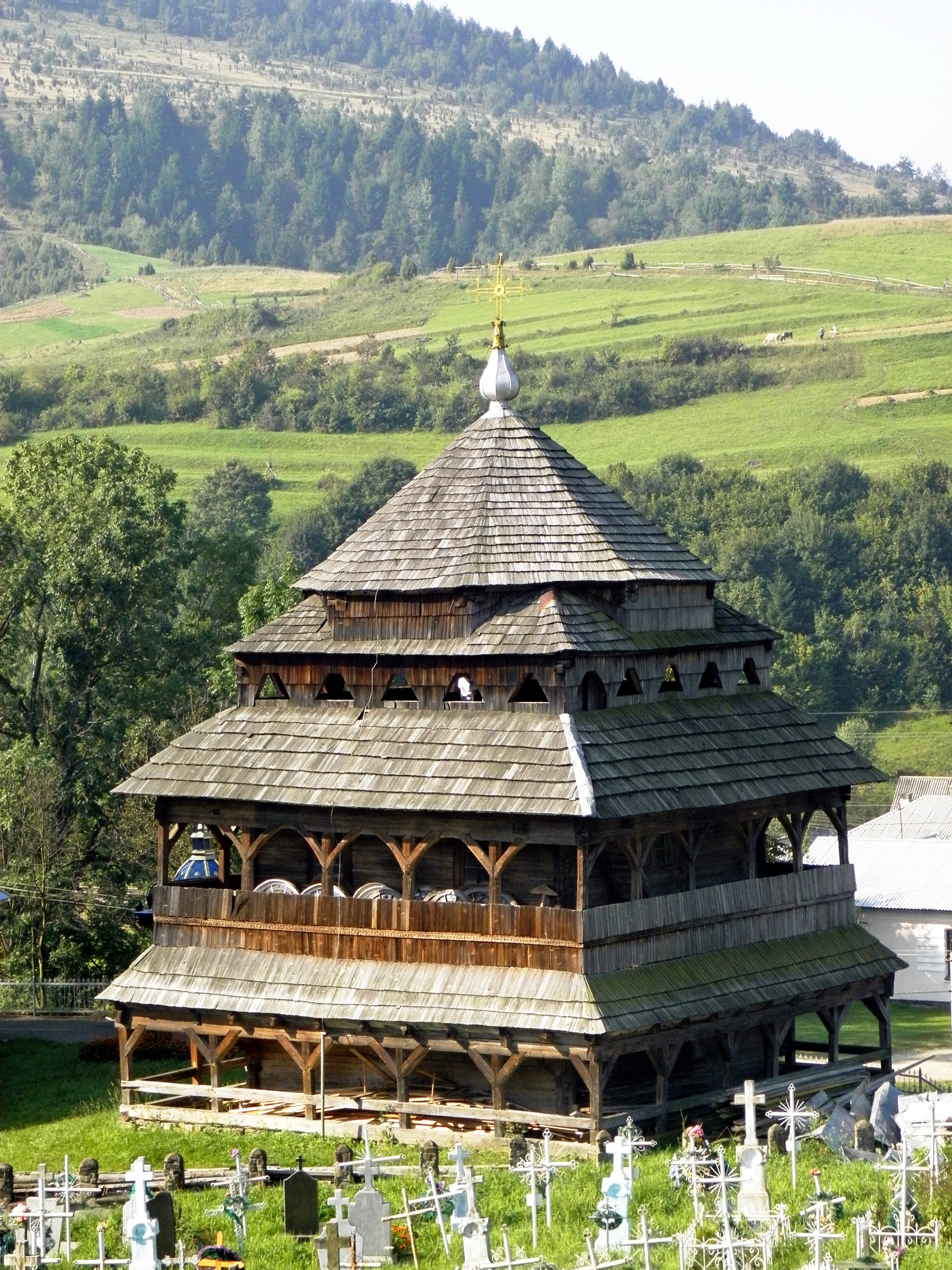
- Yasenytsia-Zamkova. Bell tower of the Church of St. Michael.
  Bell tower of the Church of St. Archangel Michael in the village of Yasenitsa-Zamkova (1730).
- Church of the Nativity of the Blessed Virgin Mary in the village of Mshanets (1924).
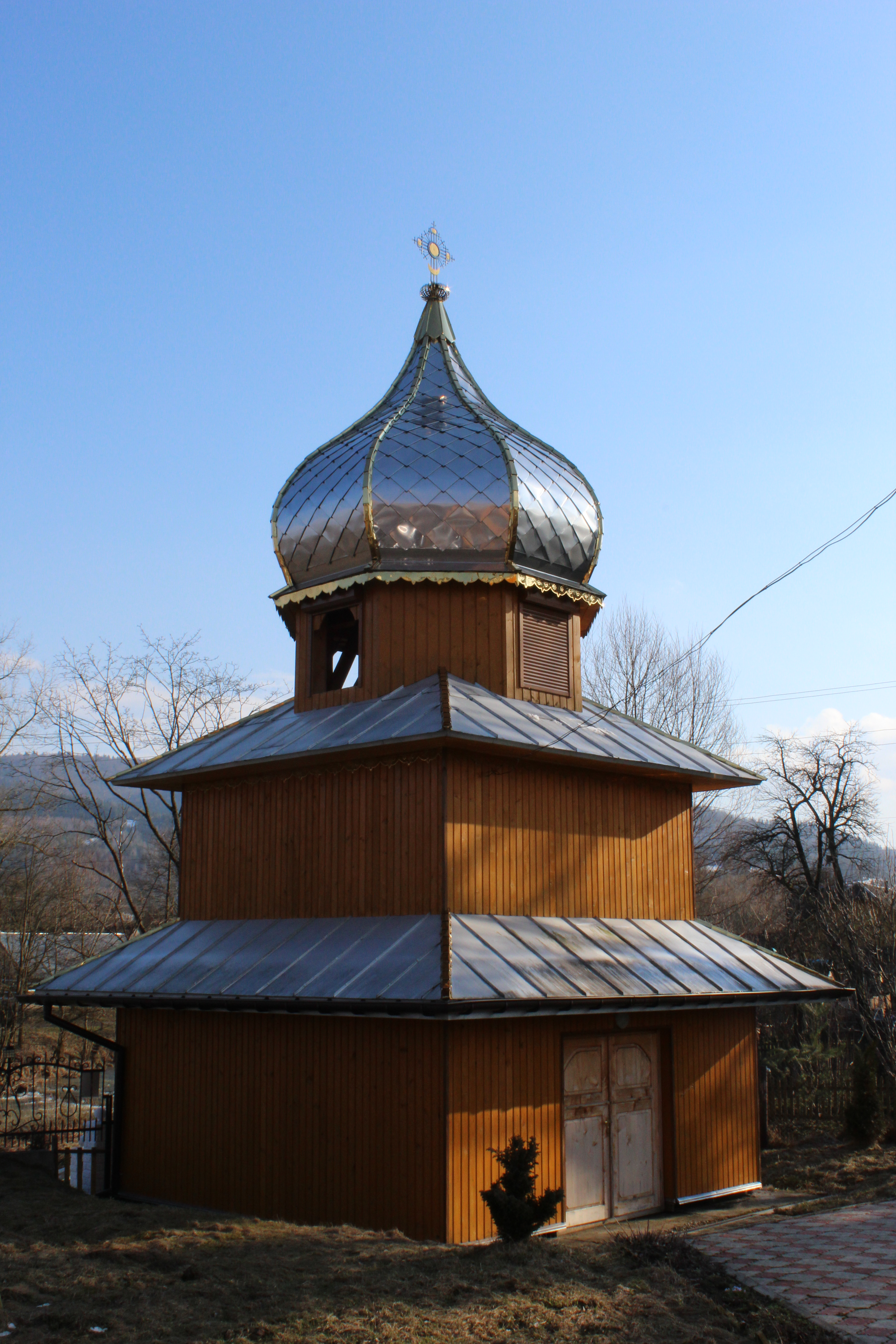
- Two-story wooden bell tower from the 18th century in the village of Mshanets.
  Bell tower of the 18th-century Church of the Nativity of the Blessed Virgin Mary in the village of Mshanets.
- Sculpture of the Sorrowful Mother of Ukraine under the Cross (1996) in the village of Mshanets.
- Church of St. Nicholas in the village of Turie (1690).
- Bell Tower "Tower of Memory" in the village of Nedilna.
- Pantheon "Glory of the Ukrainian Insurgent Army" in the village of Strilky.
- Freedom Cross in the village of Holovetske (1898).
- Mission Cross of Sobriety in the village of Hrozova (19th century).
- Insurgent hideout in the church of St. Archangel Michael in the village of Ploske.
- Insurgent hideout in the dome of the church of St. Archangel Michael in the village of Ploske.
- Church of the Assumption of the Blessed Virgin Mary in the village of Topilnytsia (1730).
- Bell tower (1730) of the Church of the Assumption of the Blessed Virgin Mary in the village of Topilnytsia.

== Prominent figures ==
- Fr. Mykhailo Zubrytskyi (Greek Catholic Priest). Fr. Mykhailo Zubrytskyi was not only a priest but also an ethnologist, historian, politician, public figure, reformer, publicist, and a full member of the Shevchenko Scientific Society (since July 29, 1904). He can be considered the founder of trends in historical science that emerged in the 20th century, such as oral history and, to some extent, microhistory. He was the first scholar in the world to choose the life and customs of peasants as the subject of scientific research. Thanks to his works, Mshanets, where he served for 31 years, is the most researched village in terms of historical and ethnographic dimensions in all of Central and Eastern Europe.
- Fr. Mykhailo Verbytskyi was a priest in the Ukrainian Greek Catholic Church (UGCC) and the composer of the music for the national anthem of Ukraine. From 1853 to 1856, he served in the village of Strilky at the Church of St. Great Martyr Eustathius (1792).
- Frank Edward Sysyn is an American and Canadian historian, science organizer, and expert in the history of Ukraine. Frank Sysyn is also the head of the CIUS department at the University of Toronto. His scholarly interests primarily focus on Ukrainian studies of the early modern Cossack era, political and religious history. He also teaches courses in history at Stanford and Columbia Universities.
- Andriy Verhovynets (writer) was born in the village of Mshanets in 1877 (the year of death and place are unknown). His real surname was Parashchak. He also used pseudonyms such as Brodyaga, Andriy, and Komar. He is the author of novellas, short stories, and sketches. One separate work, "Descendants of Mars: Pictures from Military Life," was published in New York by the Ukrainian Bookstore named after T. Shevchenko.
- Hryhoriy Piznak was an artist and iconographer born in the village of Mshanets. He was repressed along with his family by the Soviet regime. Piznak was known for his skills in iconography, painting, and portraiture.
- Stepan Vovkaniach was an economist born in the village of Mshanets (1936–2019). He held a Doctor of Economic Sciences degree, was a professor, and a corresponding member of the NGO "Ukrainian Academy of Informatics." Stepan was a leading research fellow at the Institute of Regional Studies of the National Academy of Sciences of Ukraine. He was honored as a distinguished figure in science and technology in Ukraine for his significant personal contribution to the socio-economic and cultural development of the city of Lviv. Additionally, he was a member of the Shevchenko Scientific Society (NTSh) and a former member of the Pontifical Academy of Social Sciences (1994–2004).
- Mykola Dudych - a leader of the OUN (Organization of Ukrainian Nationalists), serving as a district guide for the OUN and a county leader in the Staryi Sambir Raion. He used pseudonyms such as "Zalizniak" and "Adamchuk." Born in the village of Holovetsko on December 19, 1914. Mykola Dudych authored the song "Povstanska mohyla" (Insurgent Grave) and wrote verses and music for songs that gained popularity among insurgents and the general population. He actively participated in the defense of the Constituent Assembly of the Ukrainian Supreme Liberation Council, which took place from July 11 to 15, 1944, near the village of Sprynia in the Sambir Raion. He died on May 4, 1947.
- Vasyl Sygin, also known as "Monakh" (Monk), was a peasant and a native of the village of Hrozovo. He is recognized as the first enlightener of the region. In the 1870s, he visited the Pochaiv Lavra and returned with a stack of books in Church Slavonic and Russian languages. He also obtained a spiritual rank, which the official authorities did not recognize because the Russian Empire considered it hostile. Sygin, or "Monakh," was the first to start teaching children Church Slavonic literacy since, up to that point, the population was largely illiterate.
- Ivan Kopach (pseudonyms and cryptonyms: Narodovets, H. Kychun, I. K., K. I., I. K-ch; 1870–1952) was a Ukrainian religious and public figure, educator, linguist, and literary scholar. He held a Doctor of Philosophy degree (1901) and was a professor. He was one of the representatives of the Galician intelligentsia who dedicated his entire life to science and the Ukrainian people.
- Joseph Kit, also known by pseudonyms "Denys," "Osyp," "Sichen" (January), born in the village of Dnistryk (1920–1951), was a senior messenger of the Ukrainian Insurgent Army (UPA). He served as a courier for the leader of the Drogobych District Leadership of the Organization of Ukrainian Nationalists (OUN), Volodymyr Frayt, also known as "Zhara." Kit was the commander of the security detachment for the leader of the Carpathian Regional Leadership of the OUN, Stepan Slobodyan, also known as "Yefrem." He was a member of the courier group led by Ivan Khoma, known as "Bohdan," which delivered underground mail from Ukraine to the Foreign Representation of the Ukrainian Supreme Liberation Council (5.09.-10.10.1950). Kit attended the American intelligence school in West Germany (01.-05.1951).
- Ivan Paslavsky (Philosopher, Historian). Born in the village of Velyka Volosianka (1945), Ukrainian philosopher, historian, leading researcher at the Department of the History of the Middle Ages at the Ivan Krypiakevych Institute of Ukrainian Studies of the National Academy of Sciences of Ukraine, candidate of philosophical sciences. He researches the history of Ukrainian philosophy and religious-church life in Ukraine during the Middle Ages and the early modern period. Author of over 200 scientific and popular science works.
- Anton Knyazhytsky (Writer). Born in the village of Tysovitsya (1893–1960), literary critic, military man, educator, and public figure. He held a Ph.D., was a professor, director of the Kolomyia Gymnasium, a Sich Riflemen, and a political prisoner in Bolshevik camps. He was one of the founders of the "Boikivschyna" Museum in Sambir. He was persecuted by the Gestapo, spent time in Soviet concentration camps, escaped, and died in Philadelphia. He authored memoirs "Na dni SSSR" (1959, posthumously published in 2001) and "V kraini nevoli"; literary-critical works "Tvorchyi shlyakh Lesi Ukrainky," studies "Dukh natsii" (1959), and articles.
