= Turka urban hromada =

Hromada in Lviv Oblast, Ukraine

Turka urban hromada Турківська міська громада
- Hromada
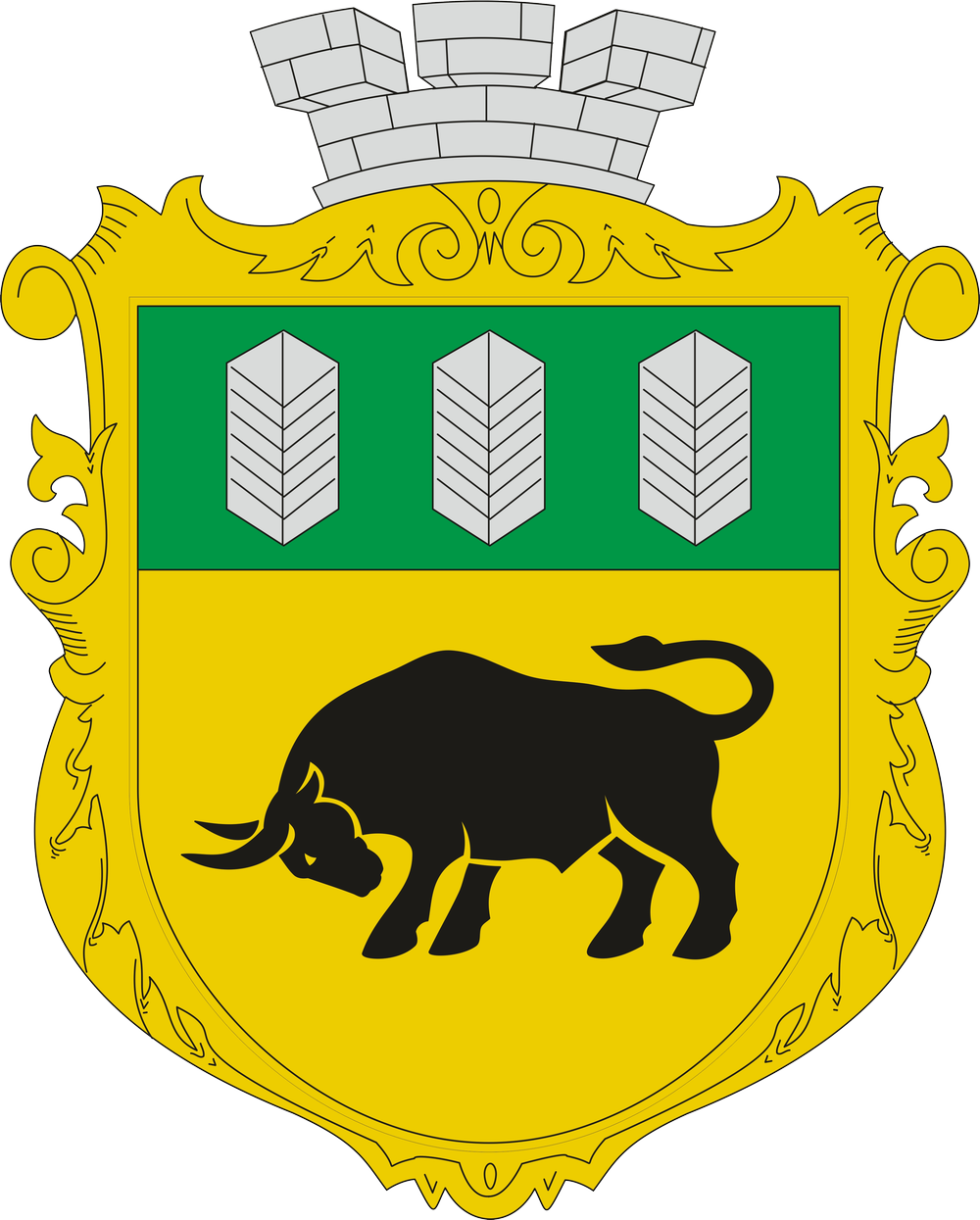
- Seal

- Location within Lviv Oblast Location within Ukraine
- Country: Ukraine
- Oblast: Lviv Oblast
- Raion: Sambir Raion
- Administrative center: Turka

Area
  - Total: 3,988 km^{2} (1,540 sq mi)

Population (2021)
  - Total: 22,529
  - Density: 5.649/km^{2} (14.63/sq mi)
- CATOTTG code: UA46080190000096121
- Settlements: 25
- Cities: 1
- Villages: 24
- Website: turka-mrada.gov.ua

Turka urban hromada (Ukrainian: Турківська міська громада) is a hromada in Ukraine, in Sambir Raion of Lviv Oblast. The administrative center is the city of Turka.

== Settlements ==
The hromada consists of 1 city (Turka) and 24 villages:

- Berezhok
- Vovche
- Dnistryk-Dubovyi
- Zhukotyn
- Zavadivka
- Zakiptsi
- Ilnyk
- Isai
- Kindrativ
- Liktiv
- Limna
- Lopushanka
- Losynets
- Mala Volosianka
- Melnychne
- Pryslip
- Radych
- Rozluch
- Stodilka
- Khashchiv
- Shumiach
- Yavora
- Yasenytsia
- Yasenka-Stetsova
