= Yasenytsia-Zamkova =

Village in Lviv oblast, Ukraine

Coordinates: 49°16′35″N 22°58′44″E

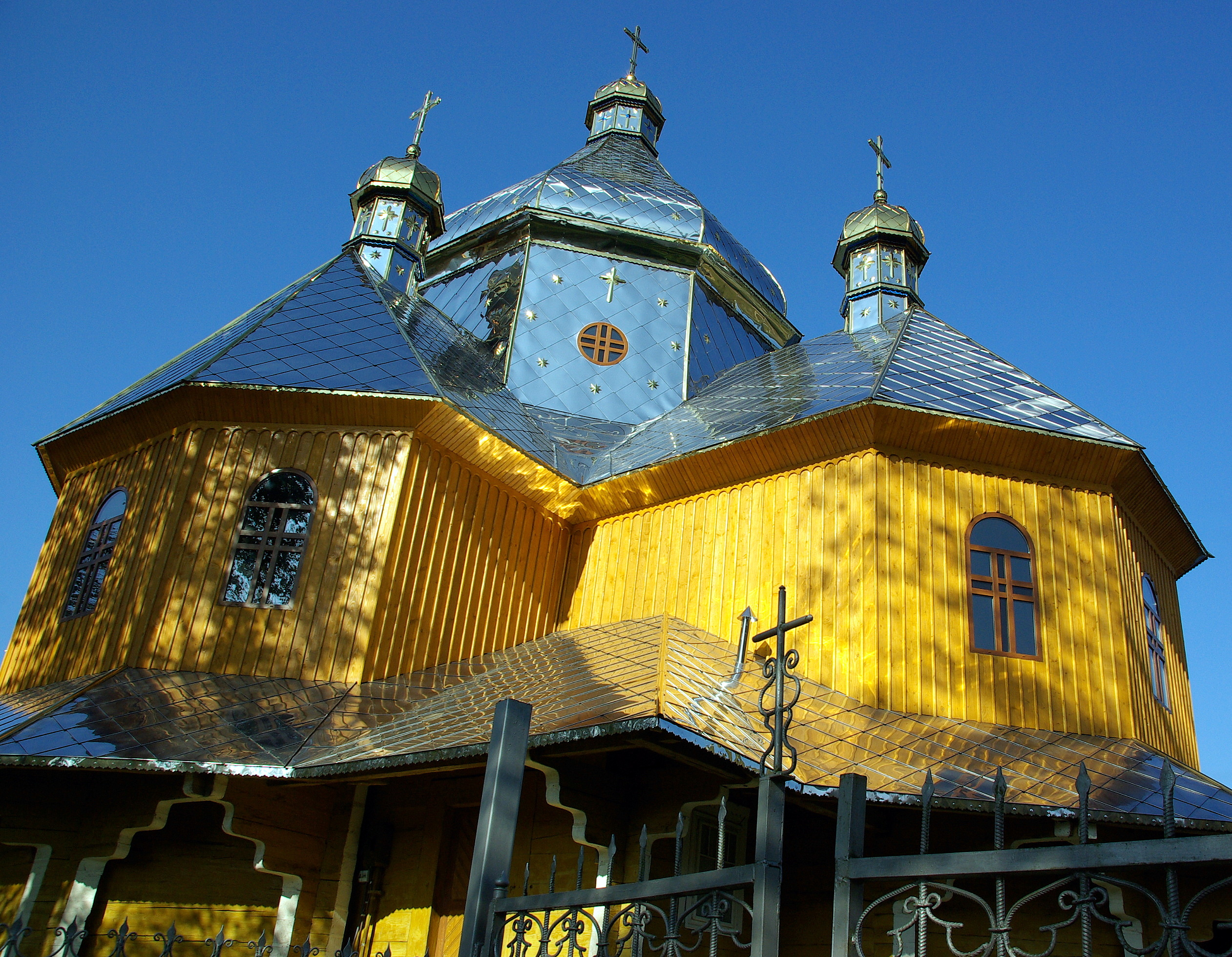
Orthodox church in Yasenytsa Zamkova (Ukraine)

Yasenytsia-Zamkova (Ukrainian: Ясениця-Замкова) is a village in the Sambir Raion of the Lviv Oblast, Ukraine. The population is 1,270 people (2021). The local self-government body is the Strilky Village Council.

== History ==
In the village in 1881, there were two churches and a water sawmill. There used to be a steam sawmill, but it was demolished in 1879. The headship belonged to Golkovska, but after her death in 1779, it was seized. The lands were divided among settlers and annexed to Hvizdets.

In 1905, a railway was laid through the village, connecting Lviv, Sambir, Turka, and Uzhhorod. The village has a railway station. Additionally, a national road of significance, connecting Lviv to Uzhhorod, passes through the village.

In 1928, the local school had 60 students.

Infrastructure of the village as of 2022 includes a church, a unique monument of Galician architecture – a three-tiered bell tower, a mini-museum of folk life, a tourist campsite, a private ethnographic homestead, a secondary school, shops, and a railway station.

In 2023, the village of Yasenytsia-Zamkova, together with surrounding villages, became part of the historical and tourist route network "BoykoMandry," created with the support of the Ukrainian Cultural Foundation and the Strilky rural hromada.
