= Lopushanka-Khomyna =

Village in Ukraine

Coordinates: 49°18′17″N 22°58′00″E

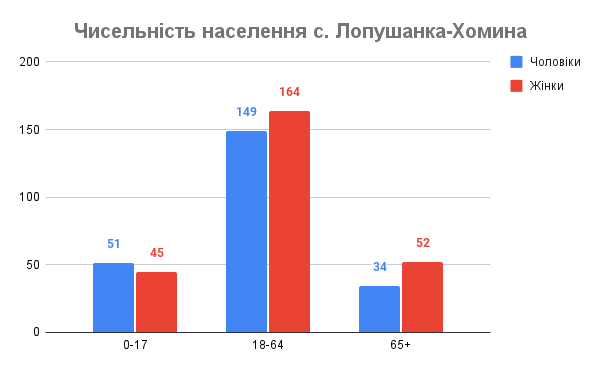
Population of the village Lopushanka-Khomyna, 2021

Lopushanka-Khomyna (Ukrainian: Лопушанка-Хомина) is a village in Ukraine, located in the Sambir Raion of the Lviv Oblast. The population is 495 people (2021). The local self-government body is the Strilky Village Council.

The population (as of 2020) is 505 people, with 399 being adults (as of March 31, 2021).

== History ==
In 2023, the village of Lopushanka-Khomyna, along with neighboring villages, became part of the network of historical and tourist routes "BoykoMandry," which is being created with the support of the Ukrainian Cultural Foundation and the Strilky rural hromada.
