= Sinyakovo, Kharovsky District, Vologda Oblast =

Sinyakovo Синяково
- Village
- Location within Vologda Oblast Location within Russia
- Coordinates: 59°59′N 40°02′E
- Country: Russia
- Region: Vologda Oblast
- District: Kharovsky District
- Time zone: UTC+3:00

Sinyakovo (Russian: Синяково) is a rural locality (a village) in Kubenskoye Rural Settlement, Kharovsky District, Vologda Oblast, Russia. The population was 14 as of 2002.

== Geography ==
Sinyakovo is located 24 km northwest of Kharovsk (the district's administrative center) by road. Berezhok is the nearest rural locality.
