= Hvozdets =

Village in Lviv Oblast, Ukraine

Hvozdets Гвоздець
- Village
- Location within Lviv Oblast Location within Ukraine
- Coordinates: 49°18′22″N 22°55′41″E
- Country: Ukraine
- Oblast: Lviv Oblast
- Raion: Sambir Raion
- Hromada: Strilky rural hromada

Area
  - Total: 0.29 km^{2} (0.11 sq mi)

Population
  - Total: 103
- Postal code: 82094

Hvozdets (Ukrainian: Гвоздець) is a village in Sambir Raion, Lviv Oblast, Ukraine. The population is 94 people. The local self-government body is the Strilky rural council.

== History ==
On May 21, 1949, a detachment led by Captain UIA Kuzma ("senior lieutenant K.") ambushed and eliminated senior officers of the Ministry of State Security (MGB) in the area between the villages of Holovetsko and Hvozdets (near the road). The victims were returning from a raid and included Colonel Kolodyazhnyi from the MGB regional headquarters, a major, a captain, and other emigres. The operation was carried out without losses on the part of the attackers.

Later, the Soviet regime liquidated the village, and the majority of the population was deported to Siberia and Huta.

On July 9, 2006, the unveiling and consecration of the memorial sign "To the Fighters for the Freedom of Ukraine" took place. It was crafted and installed under the auspices of the Lviv Regional "Brotherhood of the OUN-UPA" in honor of the heroes of the Ukrainian Insurgent Army (UPA) who perished in unequal battles with the NKVD forces.
