= Nedilna =

Village in Lviv Oblast, Ukraine

Coordinates: 49°19′27″N 23°05′21″E

Nedilna (Ukrainian: Недільна) is a village in Ukraine, located in the Sambir Raion of the Lviv Oblast. The population is 197 people (as of 2021). The local self-government body is the Strilky Village Council.

In 2023, the village of Nedilna, together with neighboring villages, became part of the historical and tourist routes network "BoykoMandry," which is being created with the support of the Ukrainian Cultural Foundation and the Strilky rural hromada.
