= Mala Volosianka =

Village in Lviv Oblast, Ukraine

Mala Volosianka Мала Волосянка
- Village
- Location within Lviv Oblast
- Coordinates: 49°14′15″N 23°01′06″E
- Country: Ukraine
- Oblast: Lviv
- Raion: Sambir
- Area: 1.5 km^{2} (0.58 sq mi)
- Population: 346
  - Density: 230/km^{2} (600/sq mi)

Mala Volosianka (Ukrainian: Мала Волосянка, Polish: Wołosianka Mała) is a village (selo) in Sambir Raion, Lviv Oblast, in south-west Ukraine. It belongs to Turka urban hromada, one of the hromadas of Ukraine.

The village is a sister settlement to Velyka Volosianka in Sambir Raion, formerly in Staryi Sambir Raion.

Until 18 July 2020, Mala Volosianka belonged to Turka Raion. The raion was abolished in July 2020 as part of the administrative reform of Ukraine, which reduced the number of raions of Lviv Oblast to seven. The area of Turka Raion was merged into Sambir Raion.
