= Strilky, Lviv Oblast =

Village in Lviv Oblast, Ukraine

Strilky Стрілки
- Village
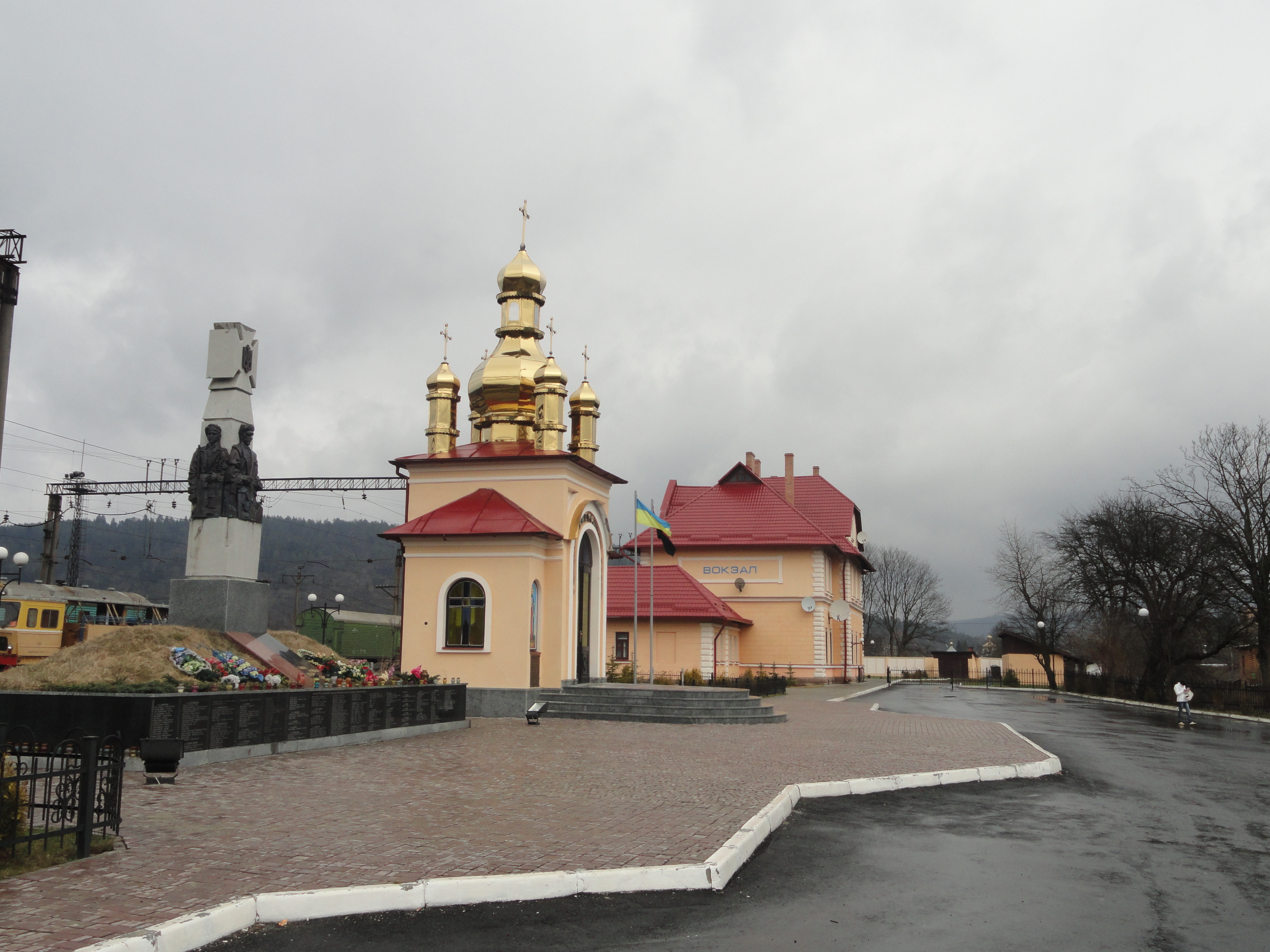
- Strilky's railway station

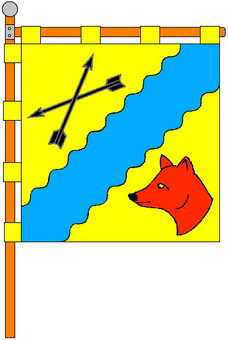
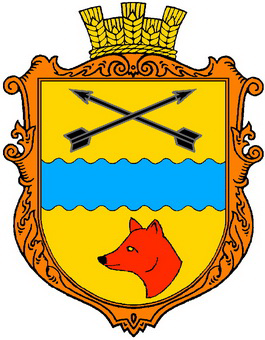
- Flag Coat of arms

- Location of Strilky in Chernivtsi Oblast Location of Strilky in Ukraine
- Coordinates: 49°19′46″N 22°58′30″E
- Country: Ukraine
- Oblast: Lviv Oblast
- Raion: Sambir Raion
- First mentioned: 1437

Strilky (Ukrainian: Стрілки) is a village in Sambir Raion, Lviv Oblast in western Ukraine. It is the administrative centre of the Strilky rural hromada, which includes 21 villages.

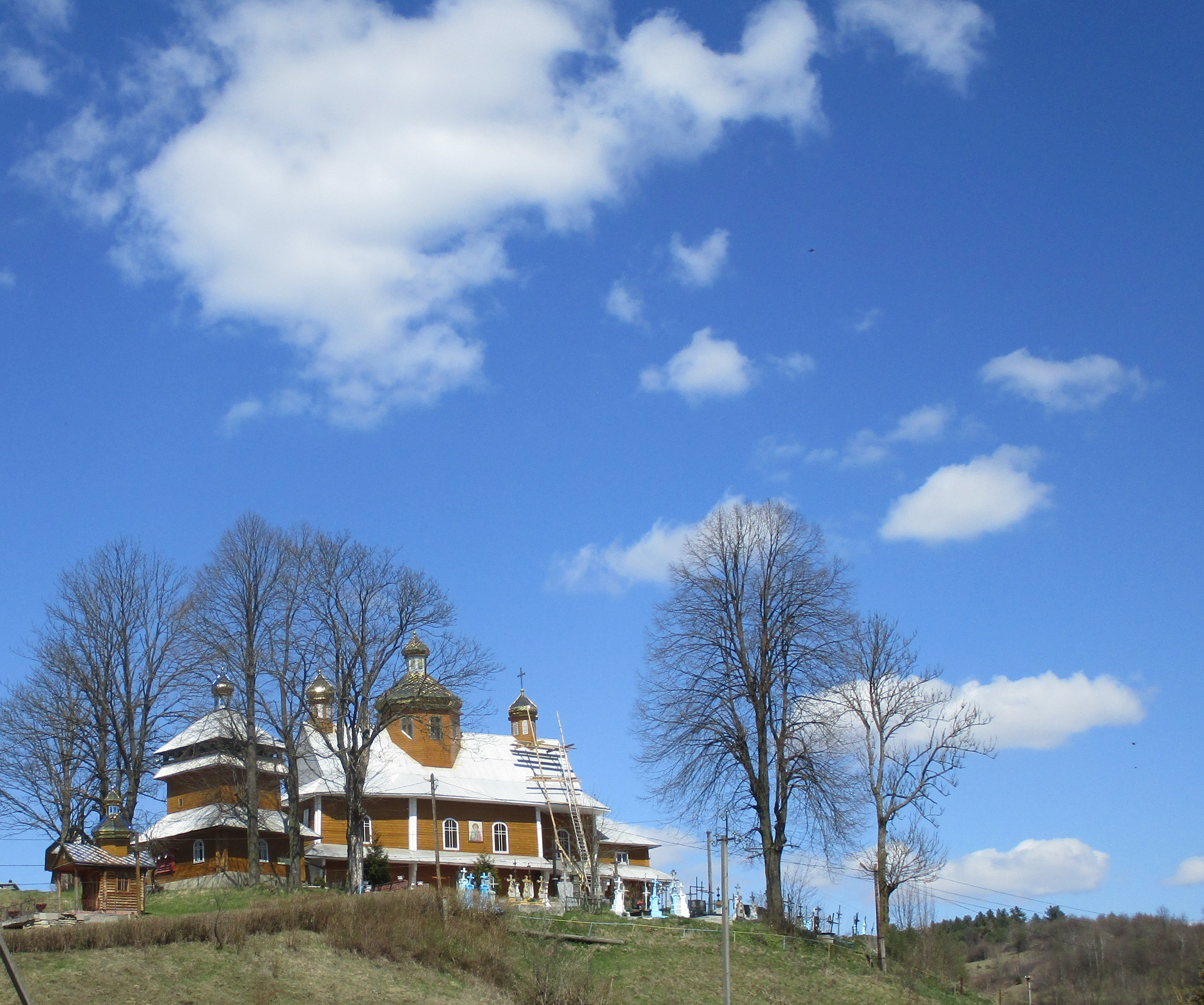
Wooden church of St. Eustachius (18th century)

As of 2021, according to official data, the population is 2,175, with 1,587 being adults.

== History ==
Archaeological research in the 1990s indicates that the lands of the village of Strilky have been a refuge for human civilization since ancient times. A bronze Age settlement (late 3d to early 1st millennium BCE) was discovered at the village entrance from Upper Luzhko. It is located on the south side of the railway line and on the right bank of the Topilchanka River. The river is a right tributary of the Dniester. The settlement sits at an elevation of 8–10 meters above the floodplain. On the northeastern outskirts of the village, about 0.5 km from the boarding school in the same direction, a settlement of the Frankish Galstatt culture was found. It is located on the right bank of the Olenka stream.

Known since 1437, there was once a wooden-earth fortress on the left bank of the Dniester (now the Mlyny hamlet).

In the 19th century, the settlement had its own symbolism: a seal depicting two human figures - a knight aiming a musket at a Tatar who hides behind a shield. The notable researcher Z. Stshetelska-Hrynberhova remarked on this: "The figures on this seal have ancient features in their attire... The headgear of one of them is quite distinctive - similar to what the Tatars used."

In 1877, the village had one water sawmill (tartak wodny), one with a sawdust collector (gatrów), and one with regular sawdust (pił zwyczajnych), producing 560 cubic meters of planks and beams at a price of 3 golden Rhenish for a cubic meter.

By 1894, Strilky had established a school with Ukrainian-language instruction. The local school is now named after Mykhailo Verbytskyi, a Ukrainian composer, choir conductor, Greek Catholic priest, public figure, and the author of the music for the national anthem of Ukraine, "Shche ne vmerla Ukraina" ("Ukraine's Glory Has Not Perished").

As of 1904, the Strilky community (including the hamlets of Lysytsia and Mlyny) had 4,580 residents.

In 1905, a railway line was laid through the village, connecting Lviv with Uzhhorod.

In 1944, the front line passed through here, and the village was completely burned down, leaving only two houses. The church was also hit by a mortar shell, damaging the doors. Signs of these fragments are still visible. The icon of St. Eustathius and the old Liturgical Book were damaged by shrapnel. The old metric books did not survive – they were taken to the archives.

Between 1940–1941 and 1949–1959, it was the center of the Strilky Raion.

Near the village, on 1 May 1949, a battle involving the Ukrainian Insurgent Army (UPA) took place. During the 1940s and 1950s, the village of Strilky had a widespread underground network of the UPA. These units operated throughout the region against both Nazi Germany and the Soviet Union. Elderly residents recount that where the town council is now located, there used to be an NKVD branch. Interrogations, torture, and executions took place there, and insurgents' corpses were thrown into a well or buried at the railway tracks.

In 1992, at the initiative of a resident of the village and active community leader, Mykhailo Havrylyk, excavations were conducted on the riverbank, revealing 138 remains of human victims of the Soviet Union. The remains were reburied in the village center, near the railway station. Among the numerous remains, a woman from a neighboring village recognised her son, whose hands and legs were bound with barbed wire, and his skull was smashed with a hammer.

In 2023, the village of Strilky, along with surrounding villages, became part of the network of historical and tourist routes "BoykoMandry" ("BoykoTravel"), which was created with the support of the Ukrainian Cultural Foundation (УКФ) and the Strilky rural hromada.
