= Tysovytsia =

Village in Lviv oblast, Ukraine

Coordinates: 49°20′16″N 22°54′56″E

Tysovytsia (Ukrainian: Тисовиця) is a village in Ukraine, located in the Sambir Raion (since 2020) of the Lviv Oblast. The population is 592 people (2021). The local self-government body is the Strilky Village Council.

== History ==
The village of Tysovytsia was founded on raw roots according to the Volskyi law in 1558. The headman Petro Boratynsky instructed the villager Ostash Dashkovich to besiege the village, granting him at the same time the right to the parish on April 17 in the same year.

In 2023, the village of Tysovitsya, together with neighboring villages, became part of the network of historical and tourist routes "BoykoMandry," which is being created with the support of the Ukrainian Cultural Foundation and the Strilky territorial community.

== The most famous natives ==
Anton Kniazhynsky (1893-1960) - the son of a local priest, doctor of philosophy, professor, director of the Kolomyia Gymnasium, volunteer of the Ukrainian Sich Riflemen and the Ukrainian Galician Army, literary critic, educational and public figure, initiator of the creation of the group "Boikivshchyna", co-founder of the museum "Boikivshchyna" in Sambir, co-publisher and co-editor of magazine "The Chronicle of Boykivshchyna", head of the Ukrainian government of Kolomyia district, political prisoner of Bolshevik concentration camps.

Vasyl Kyrylych (1964) is a Ukrainian diplomat, Ambassador of Ukraine to Croatia (since 2019), Ambassador of Ukraine to Bosnia and Herzegovina (since 2020), author of publications on ethnopolitics, Balkan studies and Eastern European topics, author of the first Ukrainian diplomatic calendar (2007, 2017), study "The world about Ukraine and Ukrainians".
