= Dnistryk =

Village in Lviv Oblast, Ukraine

Dnistryk Дністрик
- Village
- Location within Lviv Oblast Location within Ukraine
- Coordinates: 49°17′09″N 22°50′56″E
- Country: Ukraine
- Oblast: Lviv Oblast
- Raion: Sambir Raion
- Hromada: Strilky rural hromada

Area
  - Total: 0.745 km^{2} (0.288 sq mi)
- Elevation: 470 m (1,540 ft)

Population
  - Total: 311
- Postal code: 82096

Dnistryk (Ukrainian: Дністрик) is a village in Ukraine, located in the Sambir Raion of the Lviv Oblast. The population is 311 people, and the local self-government is administered by the Strilky village council.

== Notable people ==
Kіt Yosyp Ivanovych (Denys, Osyp, Sichen) - Knight of the Golden Cross of Military Merit 1st Class.
