= Hrozovo =

Village in Lviv Oblast, Ukraine

Hrozovo Грозьово
- Village
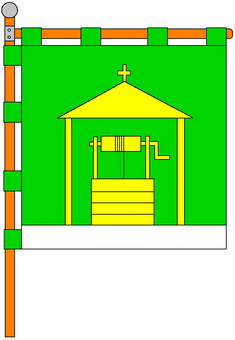
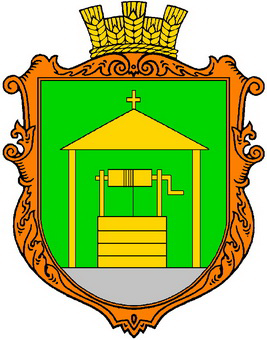
- Flag Coat of arms

- Location within Lviv Oblast Location within Ukraine
- Coordinates: 49°18′40″N 22°48′38″E
- Country: Ukraine
- Oblast: Lviv Oblast
- Raion: Sambir Raion
- Hromada: Strilky rural hromada

Area
  - Total: 1.309 km^{2} (0.505 sq mi)
- Elevation: 564 m (1,850 ft)

Population
  - Total: 690
- Postal code: 82093

Hrozovo (Ukrainian: Грозьово) is a village in the Sambir Raion, Lviv Oblast, Ukraine. The local self-government body is the Strilky village council.

The authentic name of the village is "Grozova" (Ukrainian: Ґрозьова). In 1989, the village was given its modern name.

== Geography ==
The village stretches for almost 4 km along the northeastern foothills of Mount Magura-Limnianska (1022 m above sea level), which is the highest mountain in the former Staryi Sambir Raion.

The soils in the village are low-humus and heavy, with a yellow color, primarily due to water erosion. Green tourism is not currently developed in the village, although there are all the prerequisites for its initiation.

== History ==
On the outskirts of the village, in the area called Zamchyshche, there are earthen ramparts — remnants of a fortified settlement that existed here as early as the 11th century. This fortified military settlement in Hrozovo defended the ancient route through the Carpathians known as the "Ruska Doroha" or "Rus' Road." It is along this path that a Tatar raid moved upstream along the Dniester River in 1594. According to historical records and tales, a battle with the Tatars took place on the outskirts of the village in the Posich area. The battle was uneven, and many highlanders were cut down, hence the name of the locality.

The first preserved documentary mention of the village dates back to the year 1492.

On April 2, 1893, the local community in the village opened a reading room called "Prosvita," and 46 members immediately enrolled.

The following positions were elected:

- Head: Father Mykhailo Flunt, the local priest of the Ukrainian Greek-Catholic Church.
- Deputy Head: Vasyl Segyn', the miller.
- Secretary: Yakiv Matishak, a community clerk and deacon.
- Treasurer: Mykhailo Maksymovych.
- Librarian: Mykola Kopach.

According to Father Mykhailo Zubrytskyi, there were plans to open a bookstore affiliated with the reading room, and Vasyl Sygin was to oversee its operation.

In 1928, the population of the village was 1,141 people, including 185 students and 5 Jewish families.

The village is mentioned in the memoirs of the UPA platoon leader and commander of the security of the UPA "Makivka" command, Oleksa Konopadsky ("Ostoverkh," "Topolia"). He fought in the village in 1944 and 1947–48. In particular, he describes in detail the battle in defense of the village of Hrozova in March 1945.

At that time, a band of about 400 Poles (200 from the Polish Army and over 200 bandits from Voitkova, Lishchavka, Kuzmyny, and Birchi) attacked the village, set fire to dozens of houses, and killed men. They tied local men to poles and ordered others to beat them, then untied them and ordered them to beat those who had beaten them. Several died near the poles.

36 men and two machine guns volunteered to defend the village under the command of Stepan Stebelsky "Khron". The commander divided them into 3 groups to strike from three sides of the village. Topolia, in particular, had the most difficult task: to strike at the lower end of the village, capture the mill, cross the deep river full of ice and snow, and advance. As a result of a successful battle (28 UPA members were wounded, and several were killed), Polish forces were defeated, fled in panic, and became cautious. From that time, peace came to this sector. The UPA saved several villagers from inevitable death, and everywhere it was said that there were eight thousand Ukrainian insurgents.

In 2023, the village of Hrozovo, along with surrounding villages, joined the network of historical and tourist routes "BoykoMandry," which is being created with the support of the Ukrainian Cultural Foundation (УКФ) and the Strilky rural hromada.
