= Yasenytsia =

Yasenytsia Ясениця
- Village
- Location within Lviv Oblast
- Coordinates: 49°11′39″N 23°09′49″E
- Country: Ukraine
- Oblast: Lviv Oblast
- Raion: Sambir Raion
- Hromada: Turka urban hromada
- Area: 3 km^{2} (1.2 sq mi)
- Population: 867
  - Density: 290/km^{2} (750/sq mi)

Yasenytsia (Ukrainian: Ясениця; Polish: Jasionka Masiowa) is a village (selo) in Sambir Raion, Lviv Oblast, in south-west Ukraine. It belongs to Turka urban hromada, one of the hromadas of Ukraine.

The village was first mentioned in 1527. The village boasts an Orthodox church built in 1810.

Until 18 July 2020, Yasenytsia belonged to Turka Raion. The raion was abolished in July 2020 as part of the administrative reform of Ukraine, which reduced the number of raions of Lviv Oblast to seven. The area of Turka Raion was merged into Sambir Raion.
