= Radych =

Radych Радич
- Village
- Location within Lviv Oblast
- Coordinates: 49°06′51″N 23°07′39″E
- Country: Ukraine
- Oblast: Lviv
- Raion: Sambir
- Area: 1.4 km^{2} (0.54 sq mi)
- Population: 784
  - Density: 560/km^{2} (1,500/sq mi)

Radych (Ukrainian: Радич, Polish: Radycz) is a village (selo) in Sambir Raion, Lviv Oblast, in south-west Ukraine. It belongs to Turka urban hromada, one of the hromadas of Ukraine.

The village was established in 1561.

Until 18 July 2020, Radych belonged to Turka Raion. The raion was abolished in July 2020 as part of the administrative reform of Ukraine, which reduced the number of raions of Lviv Oblast to seven. The area of Turka Raion was merged into Sambir Raion.
