= Lopushanka =

Lopushanka Лопушанка
- Village
- Location within Lviv Oblast
- Coordinates: 49°16′46″N 22°45′27″E
- Country: Ukraine
- Oblast: Lviv
- Raion: Sambir
- Area: 1 km^{2} (0.39 sq mi)
- Population: 474
  - Density: 470/km^{2} (1,200/sq mi)

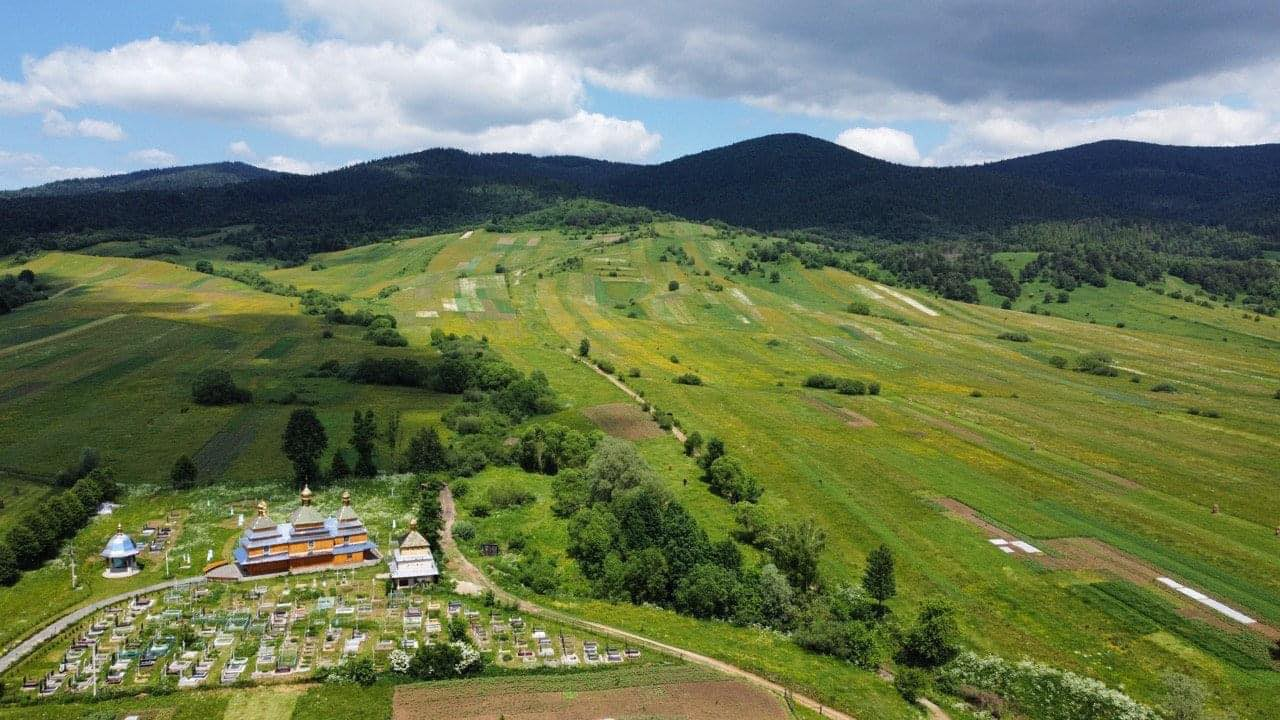
Orthodox church in Lopushanka

Lopushanka (Ukrainian: Лопушанка, Polish: Łopuszanka Lechniowa) is a village (selo) in Sambir Raion, Lviv Oblast, in south-west Ukraine. It belongs to Turka urban hromada, one of the hromadas of Ukraine.

The village was established in the 16th century, and has an Orthodox church from the 1870s.

Until 18 July 2020, Lopushanka belonged to Turka Raion. The raion was abolished in July 2020 as part of the administrative reform of Ukraine, which reduced the number of raions of Lviv Oblast to seven. The area of Turka Raion was merged into Sambir Raion.
