= Ilnyk =

Ilnyk Ільник
- Village
- Location within Lviv Oblast
- Coordinates: 49°05′12″N 23°06′15″E
- Country: Ukraine
- Oblast: Lviv
- Raion: Sambir
- Area: 2.1 km^{2} (0.81 sq mi)
- Population: 1,593
  - Density: 760/km^{2} (2,000/sq mi)

Ilnyk (Ukrainian: Ільник, Polish: Ilnik) is a village (selo) in Sambir Raion, Lviv Oblast, in south-west Ukraine. It belongs to Turka urban hromada, one of the hromadas of Ukraine.

The village was established in the second half of the 15th century. A local Orthodox church was mentioned already in 1507.

== History ==
Until 18 July 2020, Ilnyk belonged to Turka Raion. The raion was abolished in July 2020 as part of the administrative reform of Ukraine, which reduced the number of raions of Lviv Oblast to seven. The area of Turka Raion was merged into Sambir Raion.

=== The Jewish community ===
A Jewish community of 40 families lived in the village. In the summer of 1942, all the Jews from Ilnyk were forced to relocate to Turka, where they were deported in August and October to Belzec. Only a few individuals were allowed to remain in the village. In December 1942, they too were transferred to Turka and later to the Sambor ghetto, where they perished along with the rest of the community. Small groups of Ilnik Jews wandered through the surrounding forests and built bunkers to hide. Some were handed over by the peasants to the Germans and murdered. In the summer of 1943, survivors hiding in the forests, including the remnants of the Ilnik community, organized into larger groups. These groups sometimes used force to obtain food from the nearby villages. Some of them were also armed. Towards the winter of 1943-1944, two large and well-equipped bunkers were built, in which about 60 Jews were concentrated. The Germans followed in the footsteps of these bunkers, and after a battle in which the Jews also returned fire, most of them, including a number of Ilnik Jews, were killed.
