= Losynets =

Losynets Лосинець
- Village
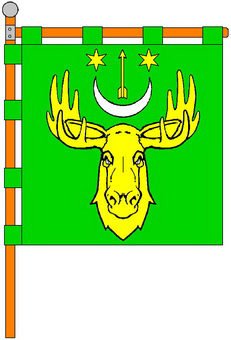
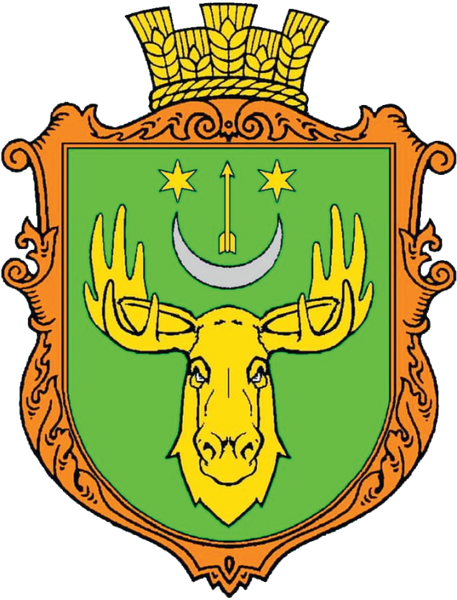
- Flag Coat of arms

- Location within Lviv Oblast
- Coordinates: 49°07′54″N 23°06′10″E
- Country: Ukraine
- Oblast: Lviv
- Raion: Sambir
- Area: 1.2 km^{2} (0.46 sq mi)
- Population: 767
  - Density: 640/km^{2} (1,700/sq mi)

Losynets (Ukrainian: Лосинець, Polish: Łosiniec) is a village (selo) in Sambir Raion, Lviv Oblast, in south-west Ukraine. It belongs to Turka urban hromada, one of the hromadas of Ukraine.

Until 18 July 2020, Losynets belonged to Turka Raion. The raion was abolished in July 2020 as part of the administrative reform of Ukraine, which reduced the number of raions of Lviv Oblast to seven. The area of Turka Raion was merged into Sambir Raion.

There is an Orthodox church built in 1892.
