= Khashchiv =

Khashchiv Хащів
- Village
- Location within Lviv Oblast
- Coordinates: 49°16′06″N 22°46′26″E
- Country: Ukraine
- Oblast: Lviv
- Raion: Sambir
- Area: 2.2 km^{2} (0.85 sq mi)
- Population: 467
  - Density: 210/km^{2} (550/sq mi)

Khashchiv (Ukrainian: Хащів, Polish: Chaszczów) is a village (selo) in Sambir Raion, Lviv Oblast, in south-west Ukraine. It belongs to Turka urban hromada, one of the hromadas of Ukraine.

The village was established in the 16th century. It boast an Orthodox church from 1870s.

Until 18 July 2020, Khashchiv belonged to Turka Raion. The raion was abolished in July 2020 as part of the administrative reform of Ukraine, which reduced the number of raions of Lviv Oblast to seven. The area of Turka Raion was merged into Sambir Raion.
