= Berezhok, Vologodsky District, Vologda Oblast =

Berezhok Бережок
- Village
- Location within Vologda Oblast Location within Russia
- Coordinates: 59°32′N 39°28′E
- Country: Russia
- Region: Vologda Oblast
- District: Vologodsky District
- Time zone: UTC+3:00

Berezhok (Russian: Бережок) is a rural locality (a village) in Novlenskoye Rural Settlement, Vologodsky District, Vologda Oblast, Russia. The population was 7 in 2002.

== Geography ==
Berezhok is located 47 km northwest of Vologda (the district's administrative centre) by road. Pokrovskoye is the nearest rural locality.
