= Holovetsko, Sambir Raion =

Village in Lviv Oblast, Ukraine

Holovetsko Головецько
- Village
- Location within Ukraine Location within Lviv Oblast
- Coordinates: 49°18′30″N 22°53′26″E
- Country: Ukraine
- Oblast: Lviv Oblast
- Raion: Sambir Raion
- Hromada: Strilky rural hromada
- Established: 1507

Area
  - Total: 3.524 km^{2} (1.361 sq mi)
- Elevation /(average value of): 492 m (1,614 ft)

Population (2020)
  - Total: 859
- Time zone: UTC+2 (EET)
  - Summer (DST): UTC+3 (EEST)
- Postal code: 82094
- Area code: +380 3238

Holovetsko (Ukrainian: Головецько, Polish: Hołowiecko) is a village (selo) in Sambir Raion, Lviv Oblast, of Western Ukraine. It belongs to Strilky rural hromada, one of the hromadas of Ukraine.

The population is 1,170 people (2001); as of 2020, the adult population is 859 people.

== Name ==
During the Soviet era, the village was called Holovetske in documents. In 1989, the historical name of Holovetsko was restored.

== History ==
The first mention of Holovetsko dated back to 1507 under the name Hołowiecko.

Until 18 July 2020, Holovetsko belonged to Staryi Sambir Raion. The raion was abolished in July 2020 as part of the administrative reform of Ukraine, which reduced the number of raions of Lviv Oblast to seven.

In the 2019-2020s, the residents of the village of Holovetsko actively participated in organizing the "Boyko Maidan" or "Action of Dignity on the Road" - peaceful protests and civil disobedience demanding the capital repair of the Strilky-Mshanets road.

In 2020, the village became part of the Strilky territorial community, becoming the administrative center for 10 other villages.

In 2023, the village of Holovetsko, together with surrounding villages, joined the network of historical and tourist routes "BoykoMandry," which is being created with the support of the Ukrainian Cultural Foundation and the Strilky territorial community.
