= Berezhok, Kaduysky District, Vologda Oblast =

Berezhok Бережок
- Village
- Location within Vologda Oblast Location within Russia
- Coordinates: 59°34′N 36°29′E
- Country: Russia
- Region: Vologda Oblast
- District: Kaduysky District
- Time zone: UTC+3:00

Berezhok (Russian: Бережок) is a rural locality (a village) in Semizerye Rural Settlement, Kaduysky District, Vologda Oblast, Russia. The population was 17 as of 2002.

== Geography ==
Berezhok is located 66 km northwest of Kaduy (the district's administrative centre) by road. Sosnovka is the nearest rural locality.
