= Rozluch =

Coordinates: 49°13′54″N 22°58′47″E

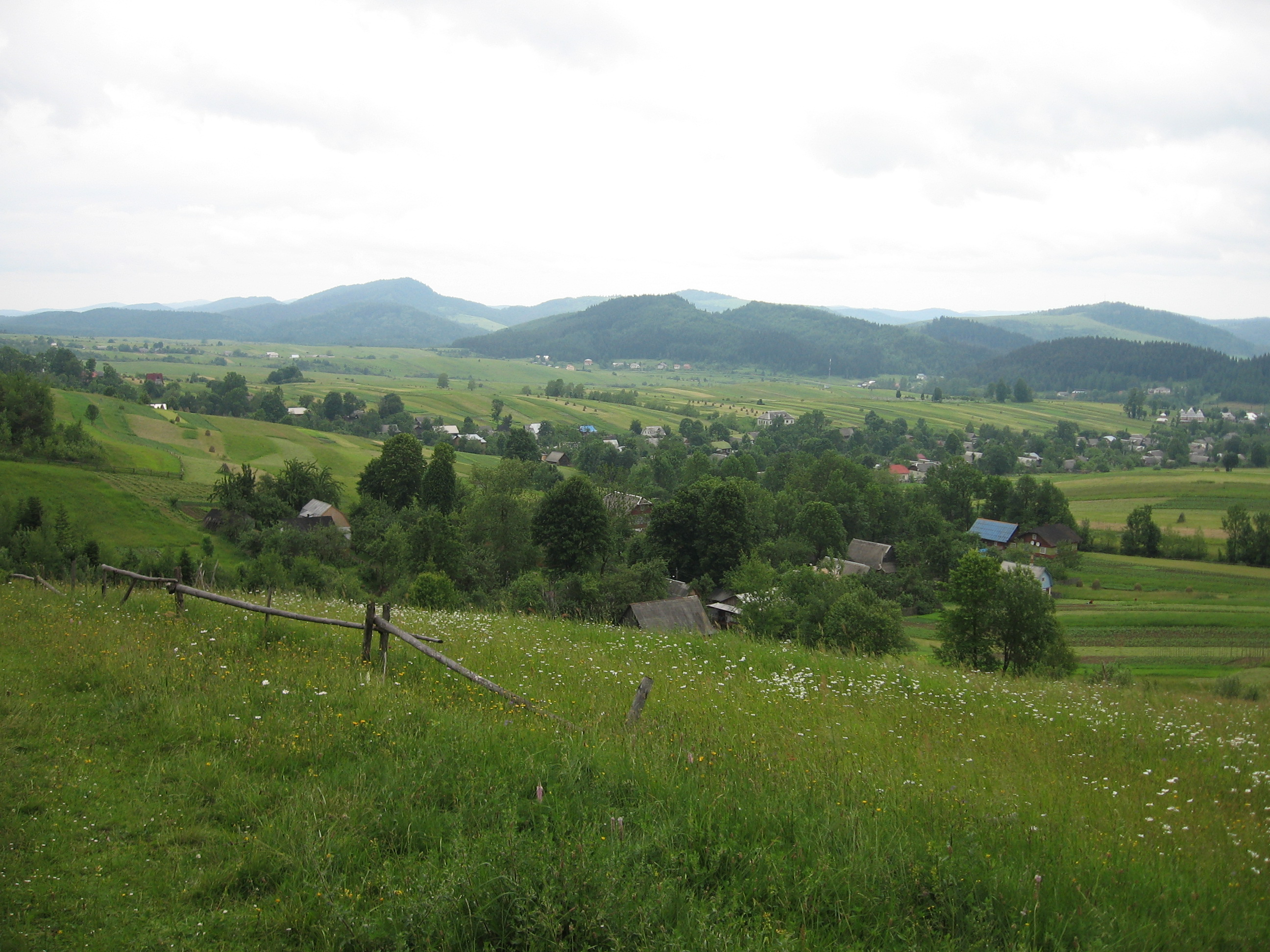
Rozluch

Rozluch (Ukrainian: Розлуч, Polish: Rozłucz, German: Roslutsch) is a village in the western Ukrainian oblast of Lviv. The village was founded in 1511 and was originally called Borysowa Wola. In 1534 the Orthodox parish was established. The current name appeared in the 2nd half of the 16th century.
