= Berezhok, Kharovsky District, Vologda Oblast =

Berezhok Бережок
- Village
- Location within Vologda Oblast Location within Russia
- Coordinates: 59°59′N 40°03′E
- Country: Russia
- Region: Vologda Oblast
- District: Kharovsky District
- Time zone: UTC+3:00

Berezhok (Russian: Бережок) is a rural locality (a village) in Kubenskoye Rural Settlement, Kharovsky District, Vologda Oblast, Russia. The population was 2 as of 2002.

== Geography ==
Berezhok is located 25 km northwest of Kharovsk (the district's administrative centre) by road. Glazunya is the nearest rural locality.
