= Berezhok =

Berezhok Бережок
- Village
- Location within Lviv Oblast
- Coordinates: 49°14′24″N 22°50′41″E
- Country: Ukraine
- Oblast: Lviv
- Raion: Sambir
- Area: 0.8 km^{2} (0.31 sq mi)
- Population: 234
  - Density: 290/km^{2} (760/sq mi)

Berezhok (Ukrainian: Бережок, Polish: Bereżek) is a village (selo) in Sambir Raion, Lviv Oblast, in south-west Ukraine. It belongs to Turka urban hromada, one of the hromadas of Ukraine.

In the interwar period the village belonged to Poland, before 1931 to Stanisławów Voivodeship, then to Lwów Voivodeship. Since 1934 it belonged to gmina Limna.

Until 18 July 2020, Berezhok belonged to Turka Raion. The raion was abolished in July 2020 as part of the administrative reform of Ukraine, which reduced the number of raions of Lviv Oblast to seven. The area of Turka Raion was merged into Sambir Raion.
