= Velyka Volosianka =

Village in Lviv Oblast, Ukraine

Velyka Volosianka Велика Волосянка
- Coordinates: 49°15′13″N 23°01′34″E
- Country: Ukraine
- Oblast: Lviv Oblast
- Raion: Sambir Raion
- Hromada: Strilky rural hromada
- Established: 1556

Area
  - Total: 1.877 km^{2} (0.725 sq mi)
- Elevation: 571 m (1,873 ft)

Population
  - Total: 428
- Postal code: 82097

Velyka Volosianka (Ukrainian: Велика Волосянка) is a village in Ukraine, located in the Sambir Raion of Lviv Oblast.
The population is 329 people (as of 2021). The local self-government body is the Strilky rural council.

== Geography ==
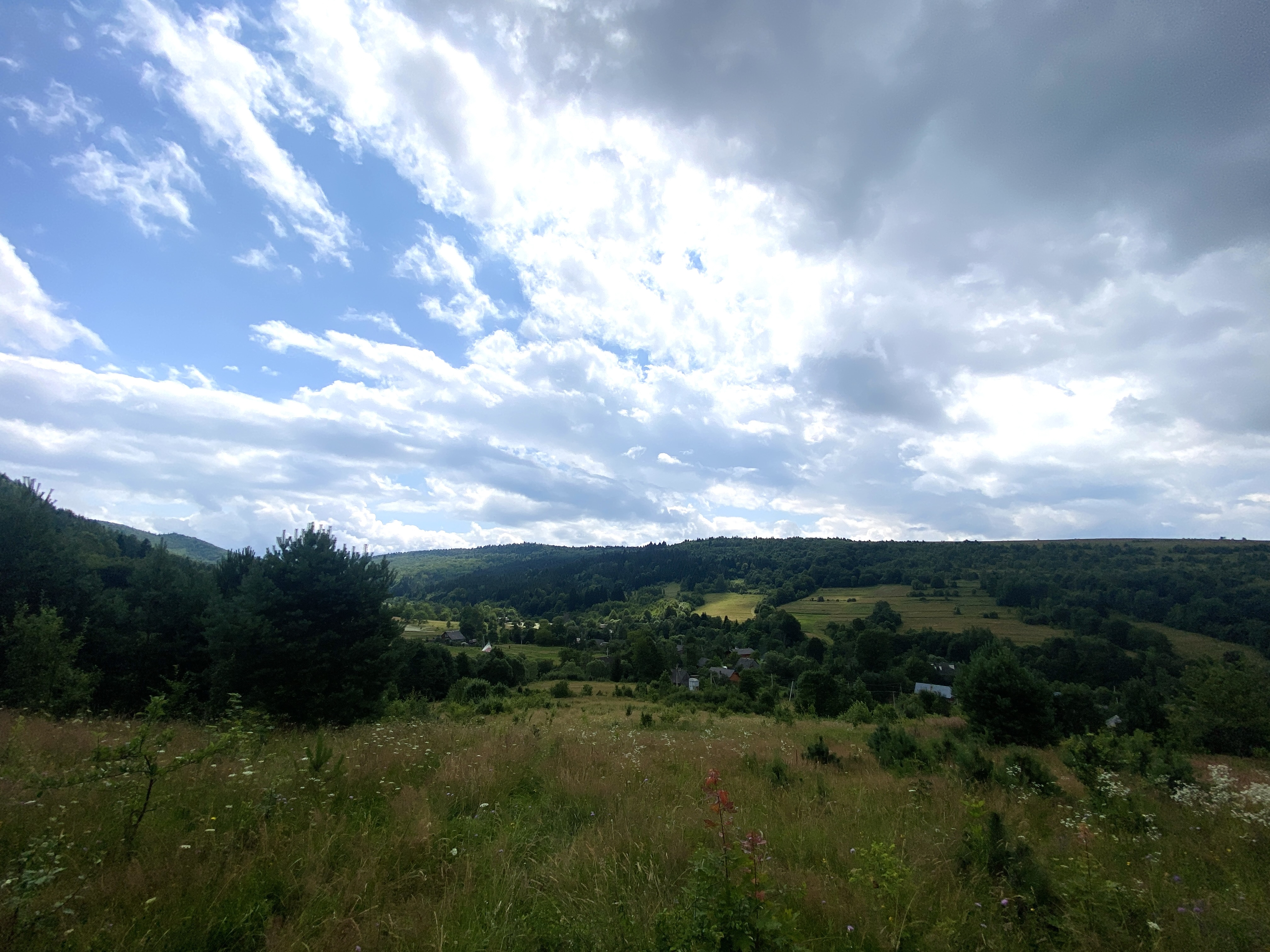
"Velyka Volosyanka village, Strylky hromada. The photo was taken as part of the "BoykoTravels" project, 2023.

Through the village flows the Volosianka River.

Inventory of 1760: "A large forest to the east, called Berdo, consisting of beech and spruce trees. The forest to the north, known as Kotelnytsi, contains spruce, beech, and hazel." In the outskirts of the village Velyka Volosianka, one can observe the remnants of mines from which oil was extracted in the 1930s of the last century.

== History ==
=== Kingdom of Poland and Grand Duchy of Lithuania (1385-1569) and Polish-Lithuanian Commonwealth (1569-1772). ===
The village was founded in 1556, although the first written mention of it is in 1559, when king Sigismund II Augustus gave Tymko Kushmiet and his brothers the permission to establish the village Velyka Volosianka near a river. During the times of the Polish-Lithuanian Commonwealth, it belonged to the royal estates, within the Volosianka region, in the Sambir economic district.

=== The Habsburg Monarchy and the Austro-Hungarian Empire (1772-1914) ===
In 1874, Ivan Franko visited the village, organizing his first tourist journey through Boyko villages while still a schoolboy at that time.

=== World War II and the Second Ukrainian Liberation Struggle (1939-1950s) ===
In the village, fighters of the Ukrainian Insurgent Army (UPA) battled against the German Hitlerite Army, the Polish military forces, and the Red Army of the Soviet Union during World War II and the subsequent liberation struggles. The locals actively supported the UPA fighters.

=== Independent Ukraine ===
In July 2023, an oral history practicum was conducted by second-year students of the bachelor's program 'Artes Liberales: History' at the Humanities Faculty of the Ukrainian Catholic University (UCU). As part of this practicum, students interviewed local residents about the coexistence experience of different nationalities in the 20th century, childhood in the USSR in the 1950s-60s, and attitudes towards Sovietization and collectivization in the late 1940s to the early 1950s in Western Ukrainian lands. In 2023, the village became part of the network of historical and tourist routes "BoykoMandry" is being created with the support of the Ukrainian Cultural Foundation (UKF) and the Strilkivska territorial community.

== Population ==
In 1890, there were 81 houses and 467 residents: 449 Greek Catholics, 1 Roman Catholic, 17 Jews (465 Ruthenians, 2 Poles).

In 1938, the village had a population of 670 Greek Catholics (parish - 1233 Greek Catholics), 5 Roman Catholics, 30 Jews.

== The Church of Saint Nicholas ==
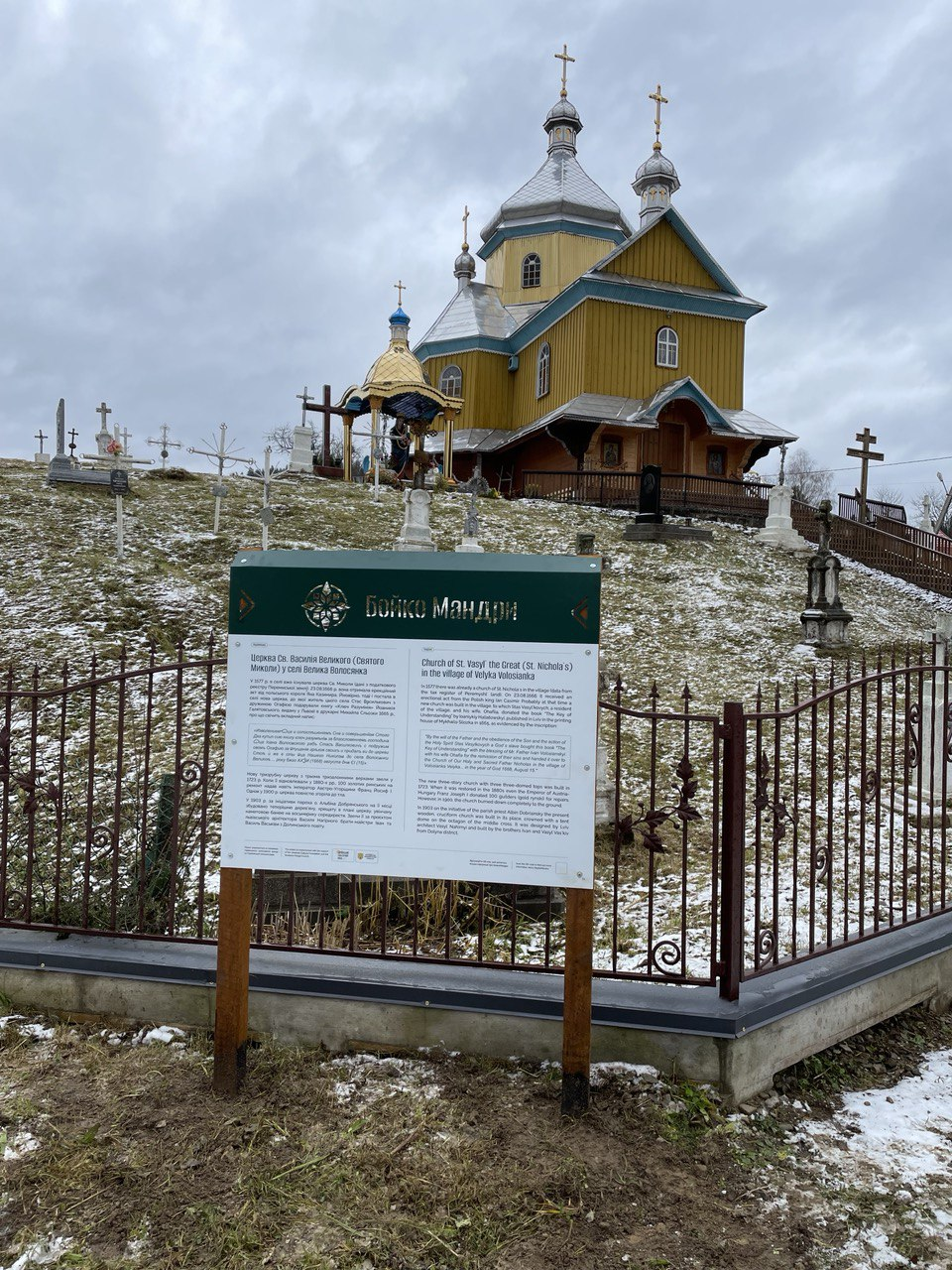
Velyka Volosyanka. The 'BoykoMandry' stand near St. Nicholas Church.

The first mention of the Church of St. Nicholas dates back to the tax register of Przemyśl Land in 1577.

The erection document for the parish was issued on August 23, 1666, by King Jan Kazimierz. Presumably, it was around that time when the new church in the village was built. A resident of the village, Stas Vasylkovych, and his wife Oghafiya, donated the book "Klyuch Razuminiya" by Yoyanikiy Halyatovsky, published in Lviv in the printing house of Mykhailo Slyozka in 1665. This information is reported in the insert inscription.

A new wooden church was constructed in 1723 on the site of the previous one. It was a three-part, three-dome church with three triple-tiered towers.

In the visitation record of 1766, there is a description: "The Church of St. Nicholas, partially hewn from timber and partially knee-timbered, was erected in 1723 on the old site with three towers, each with two tiers. The entrance is from the west. In the nave, there are two windows on the south side, one on the east side near the altar, and two on the north side. Bells are located above the narthex."

In the 1880s, it underwent restoration, and the funds, amounting to 100 gold guilders from 1881, were provided by Emperor Franz Joseph I of Austria-Hungary.
In the year 1900, this church burned to the ground. In 1903, the current cruciform wooden church, crowned with an onion-shaped dome at the intersection of the arms, was built on its site. It was constructed according to the design of Lviv architect Vasyl Nahirnyi by the craftsmen brothers Ivan and Vasyl Vaskiv from Dolynsky district (inscription on the beam under the floor of the altar). These same Vaskiv brothers also built the church in Volosianka Mala, now within the territory of the Turka community. The initiator of the construction was the parish priest, Father Albin Dobryansky.
Until 1946, it belonged to the Stary Sambir deanery of the Peremyshl-Sambir-Syanytsya Eparchy of the UGCC (Ukrainian Greek Catholic Church). In 1946, after the liquidation of the UGCC by the Soviet regime, the parish of Velyka Volosianka became part of the Russian Orthodox Church.
The church remained closed from 1961 to 1989.
After its reopening in 1989, the parish belonged to the Russian Orthodox Church. From 1992 onwards, it became part of the UOC-KP (Ukrainian Orthodox Church of the Kyivan Patriarchate), and Greek Catholics are not allowed to serve.
In 1990, the community carried out repairs to the church.
Church situated on a hill above the village road in the southern outskirts of the village. Around the church on the slopes of the hill is the village cemetery. To the southeast of the church stands a wooden two-story bell tower.
The church in Velyka Volosianka belongs to the finest wooden sacred structures in the Neo-Ukrainian style in the Staryi Sambir Raion.

== Prominent residents ==
Ivan Paslavskyi (February 8, 1945, Velyka Volosianka village, Staryi Sambir Oblast, Drohobych Oblast— August 2, 2021) — Ukrainian philosopher, historian, leading research associate, Ph.D. in philosophy.

== Tourist complexes ==
Eco-Retreat "Kaskad". In addition to comfortable Euro-style rooms with panoramic windows and terraces, there is a sauna, pergolas with barbecue areas, a waterfall and a cascade of lakes, a flower bed with strawberries, and a small eco-farm. Nearby are the mineral water springs "Naftusia," "Sodova," "Sribno-Kremniieva."

Eco-Retreat "Beskydy" - a three-story wooden house with 7 rooms (up to 20 guests), featuring a pond, pergolas, barbecue, children's playground, trampoline, and on-site sauna.

Modular Building.
