= Kindrativ =

Kindrativ Кіндратів
- Village
- Location within Lviv Oblast
- Coordinates: 49°10′20″N 23°10′59″E
- Country: Ukraine
- Oblast: Lviv
- Raion: Sambir
- Area: 1.3 km^{2} (0.50 sq mi)
- Population: 313
  - Density: 240/km^{2} (620/sq mi)

Kindrativ (Ukrainian: Кіндратів, Polish: Kondratów) is a village (selo) in Sambir Raion, Lviv Oblast, in south-west Ukraine. It belongs to Turka urban hromada, one of the hromadas of Ukraine.

In 1880 the village had 273 inhabitants, all of them Greek Catholic Boykos.

Until 18 July 2020, Kindrativ belonged to Turka Raion. The raion was abolished in July 2020 as part of the administrative reform of Ukraine, which reduced the number of raions of Lviv Oblast to seven. The area of Turka Raion was merged into Sambir Raion.
