= Limna =

Limna Лімна
- Village
- Location within Lviv Oblast
- Coordinates: 49°15′05″N 22°48′57″E
- Country: Ukraine
- Oblast: Lviv
- Raion: Sambir
- Established: 1519
- Area: 1.6 km^{2} (0.62 sq mi)
- Population: 1,216
  - Density: 760/km^{2} (2,000/sq mi)

Limna (Ukrainian: Лімна, Polish: Dnięstrzyk Dębowy) is a village (selo) in Sambir Raion, Lviv Oblast, in south-west Ukraine. The village was established in 1519. It belongs to Turka urban hromada, one of the hromadas of Ukraine.

Until July 18, 2020, Limna belonged to Turka Raion. The raion was abolished as part of the administrative reform of Ukraine, which reduced the number of raions of Lviv Oblast to seven. The area of Turka Raion was merged into Sambir Raion.
