= Ukrainian Cultural Foundation =

Ukrainian government agency

- Ukrainian: Український культурний фонд

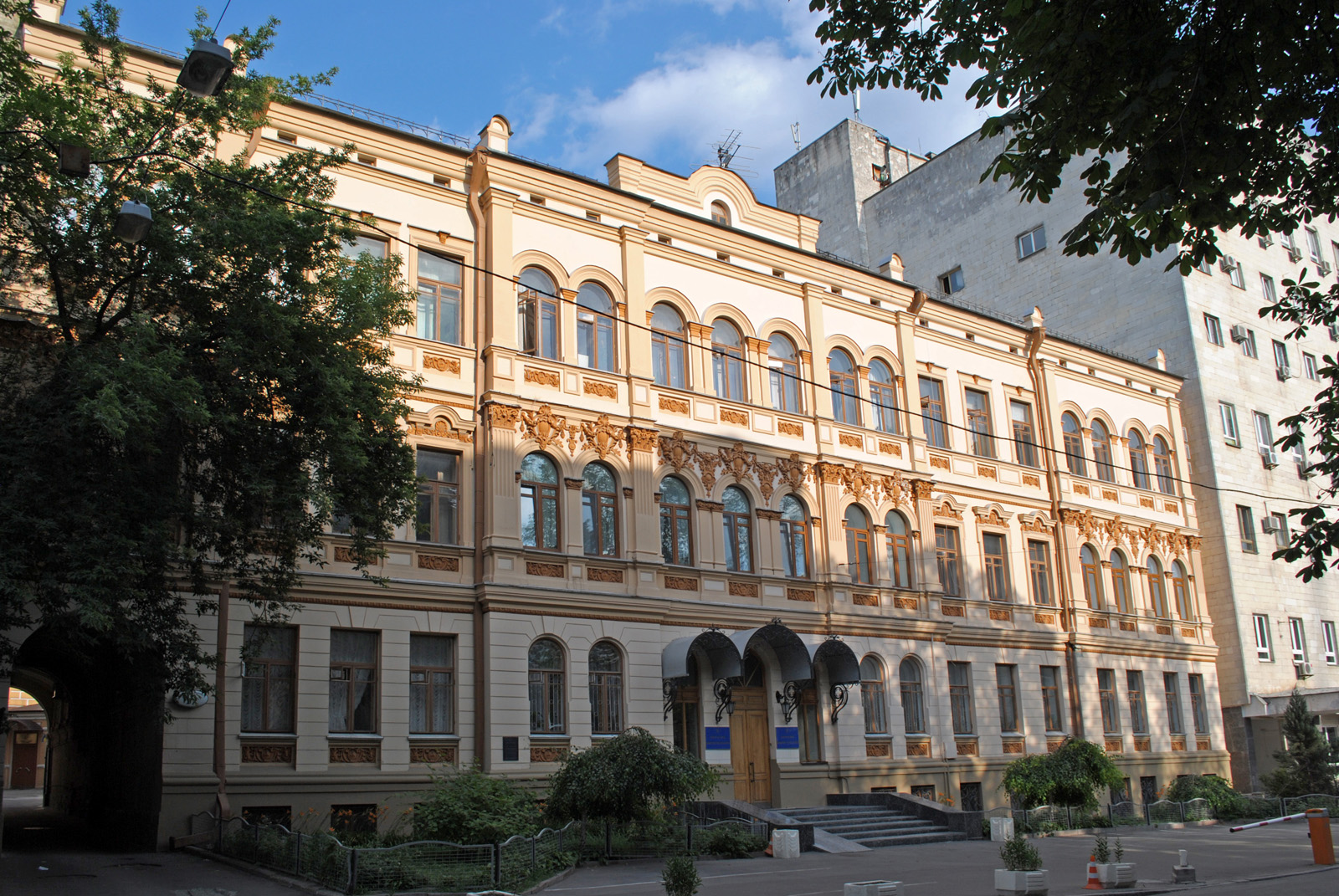

Agency overview
- Formed: March 23, 2017
- Jurisdiction: Ministry of Culture
- Status: active
- Headquarters: Kyiv
- Minister responsible: Oleksandr Tkachenko
- Agency executives: Vladyslav Berkovski, Chairman of the Foundation; Yuri Artemenko, CEO
- Website: ucf.in.ua

Ukrainian Cultural Foundation (UCF, Ukrainian: Український культурний фонд, romanized: Ukrainskyi kulturnyi fond) is a state agency of Ukraine, established in 2017, in order to promote the development of national culture and art in the country, provide favourable conditions for the development of the intellectual potential of individuals and society, wide access to national cultural heritage, support of cultural diversity and integration of Ukrainian culture into the world culture. The activities of the fund are coordinated by the Ministry of Culture of Ukraine.

== History ==
The idea of the creation of the Ukrainian Cultural Foundation was expressed by the former Minister of Culture Yevhen Nyshchuk in early 2017. He motivated this desire by the idea of "equalizing access to the resources of cultural and artistic organizations of the budgetary and non-budgetary sectors", as well as to deprive the ministry of "uncharacteristic functions of distribution of funds between players in the cultural space".

On March 23, 2017, the Parliament of Ukraine supported the idea and officially created Ukrainian Cultural Foundation.

== Functions ==
Main functions of the foundation are promotion and the implementation of state policy in the field of culture and art, the development of modern areas of cultural and artistic activities, stimulation of the development of innovative projects, support of international projects, preservation, actualization and promotion of national cultural heritage, support of artistic debuts, stimulation of creative work of cultural and art figures, in particular young artists, popularization of Ukrainian culture, formation of a positive image of Ukraine in the world, support of cultural projects of the Ukrainian diaspora etc.

== Management ==
=== Chairman of the Foundation ===
The Foundation is headed on a voluntary basis by the chairman, who, according to current legislation, must be a specialist in the field of culture, have an impeccable business reputation, high public authority, be fluent in the state language and speak a foreign language, one of the official languages of the Council of Europe.

Chairman is appointed by the Minister of Culture.

On January 19, 2018 Maryna Poroshenko, wife of the fifth President of Ukraine Petro Poroshenko, was appointed to the position of the Chairman of Ukrainian Cultural Foundation. On December 16, 2019, she resigned from the position.

On February 1, 2020, former leader of Ivan Franko National Academic Drama Theater, Mykhaylo Zakharkevych was appointed as the Chairman of UCF.

=== CEO ===
Direct organizational and financial management of the fund, according to the law, is carried out by the CEO, who is elected by the supervisory board of the fund on an open competitive basis, after which he signs an employment contract with the Ministry of Culture of Ukraine.

On February 7, 2018, as a result of an open competition, Yuliia Fediv was elected as CEO of the Founfation.

On June 14, 2021, as a result of an open competition, Vladyslav Berkovski was elected as CEO of the Foundation.

== Sources ==
- Cultural revival and social transformation in Ukraine, The role of culture and the arts in supporting post-Euromaidan resilience, Chatham House, Research Paper, November 2020
- Ukrainian Cultural Foundation as a Subject of Public Cultural Policy, O. Kulinich, A. Havrashenko, Vol 2 No 69 (2020): Theory and Practice of Public administration, ISSN 1727-6667, https://doi.org/10.34213/tp.20.02.06
