= Bielsko-Biała =

City in Silesian Voivodeship, Poland

- City county
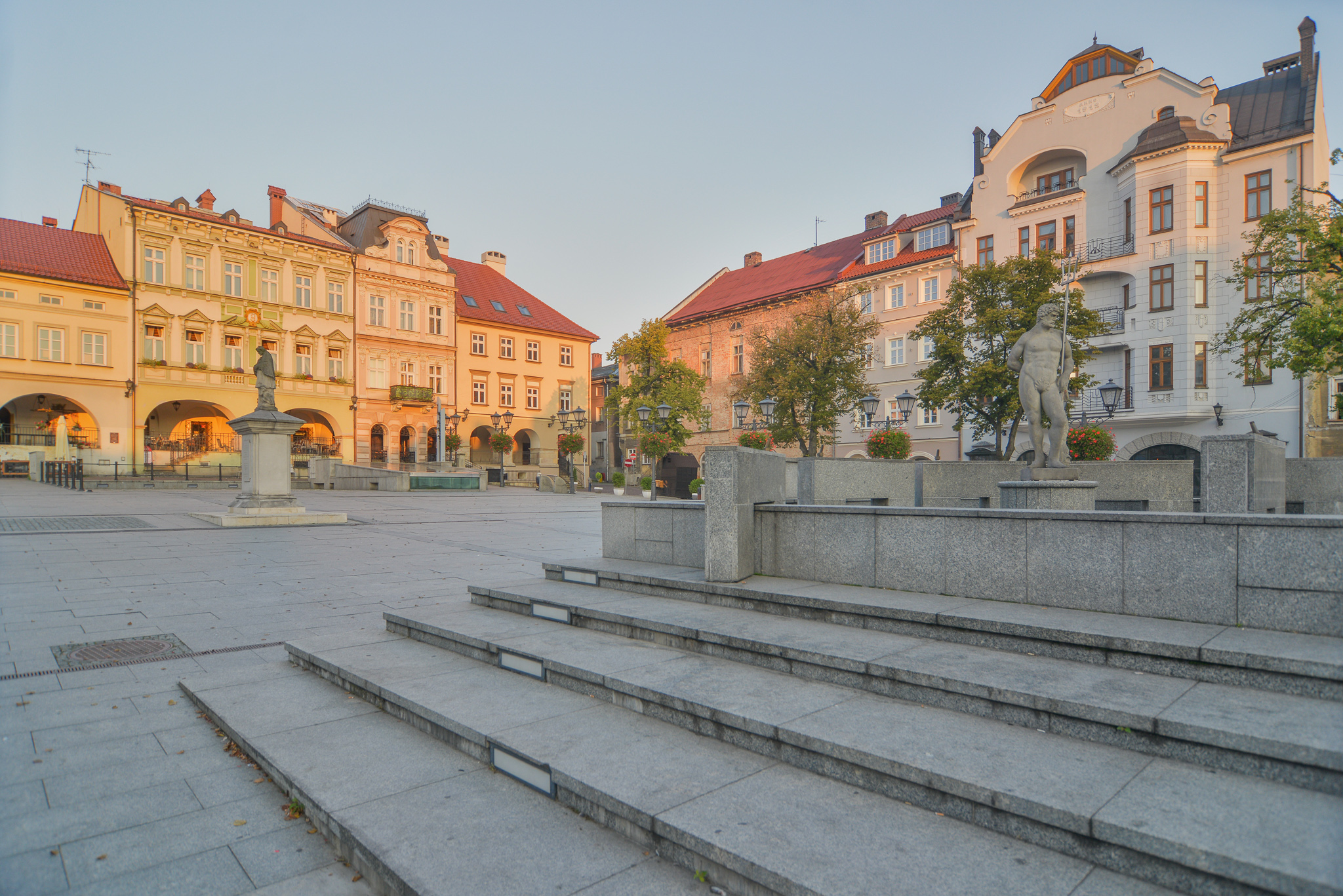
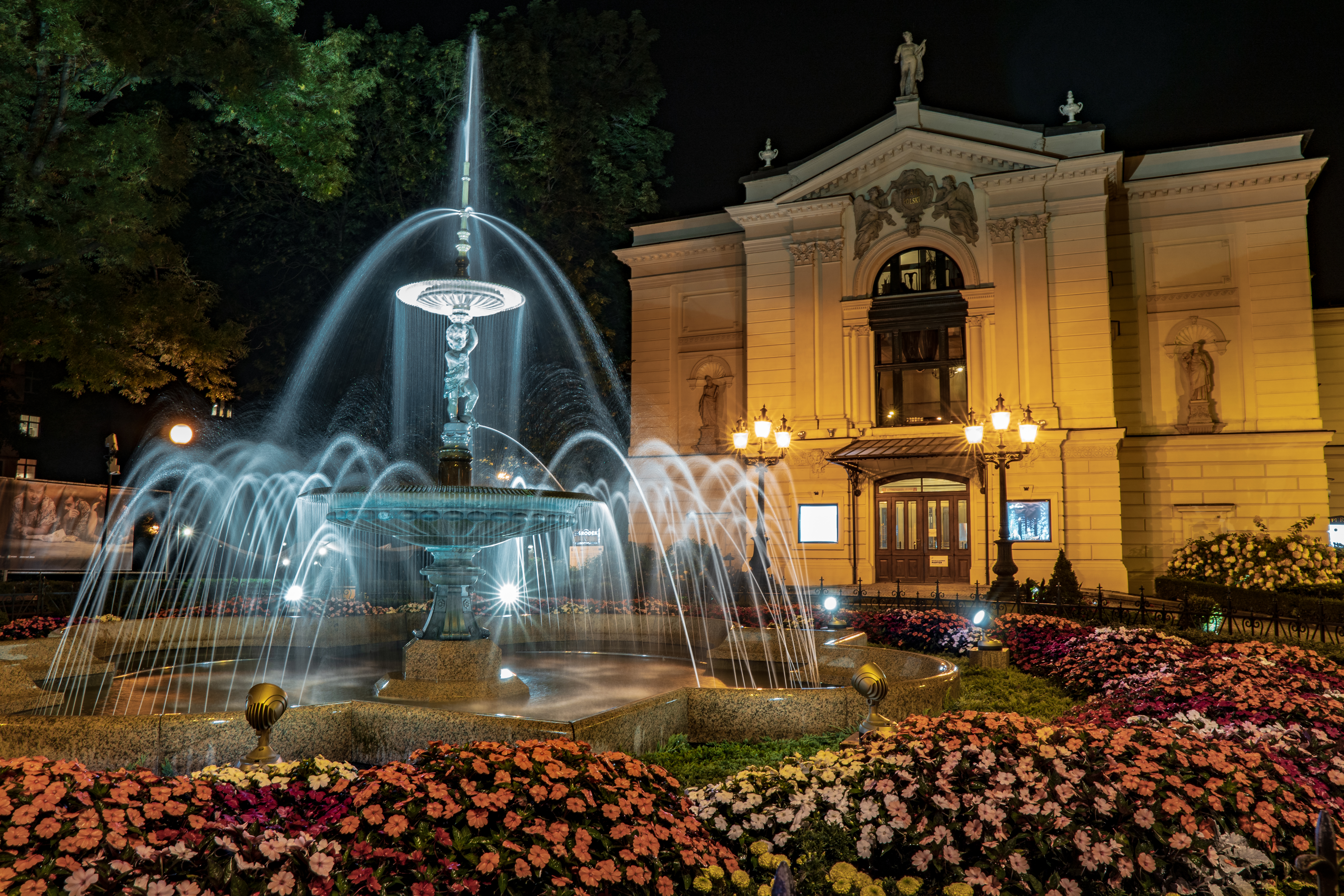
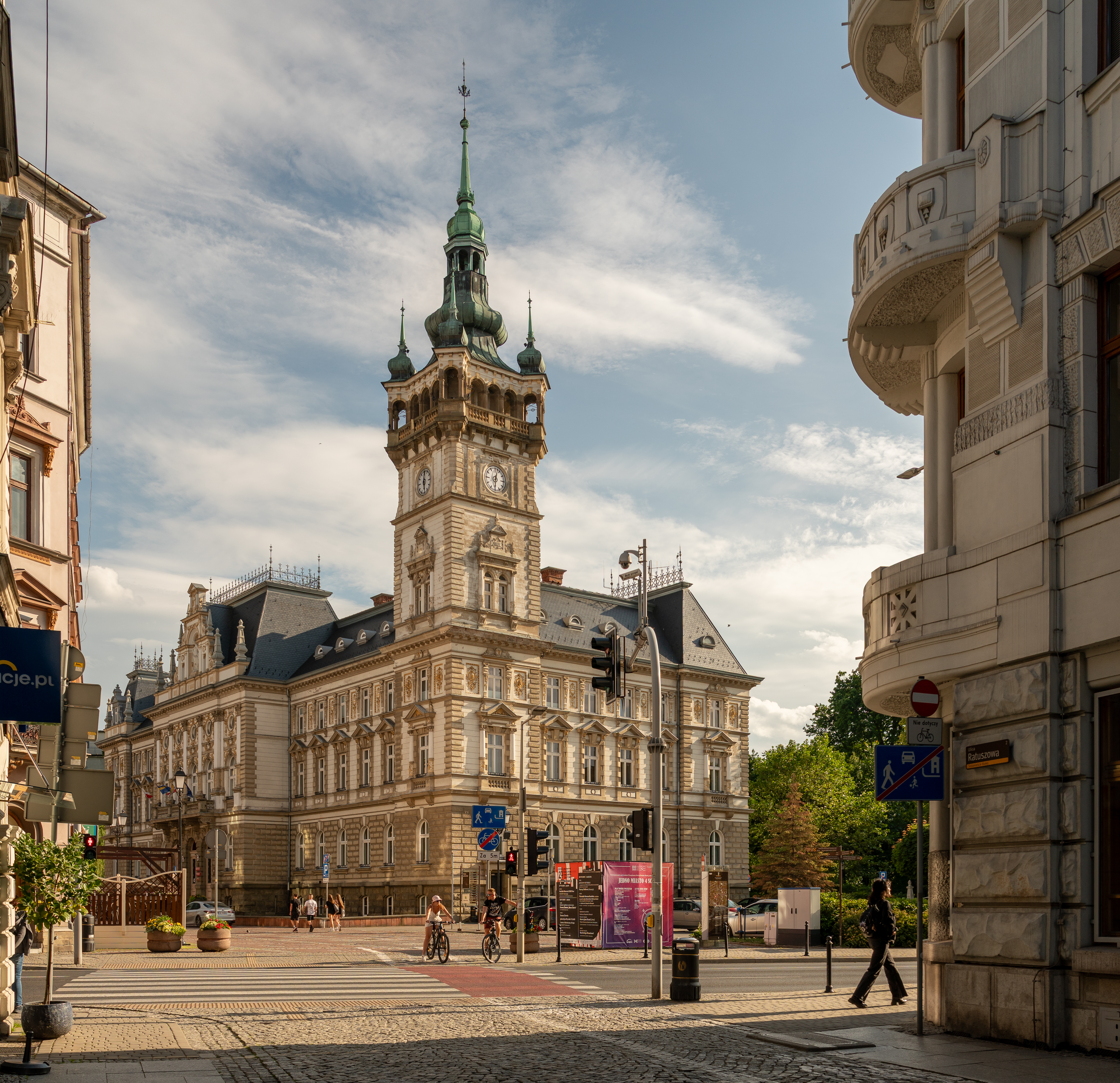
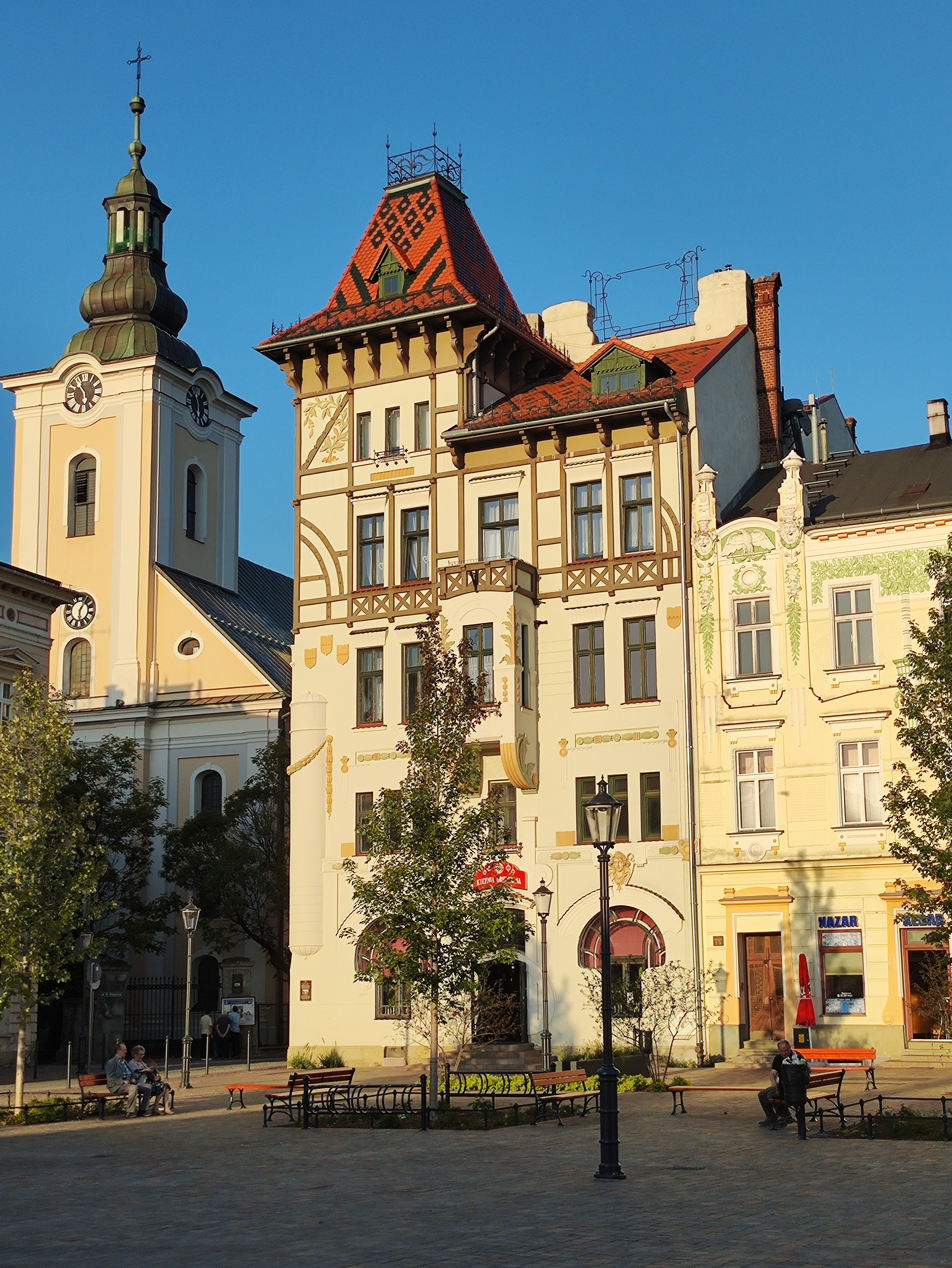
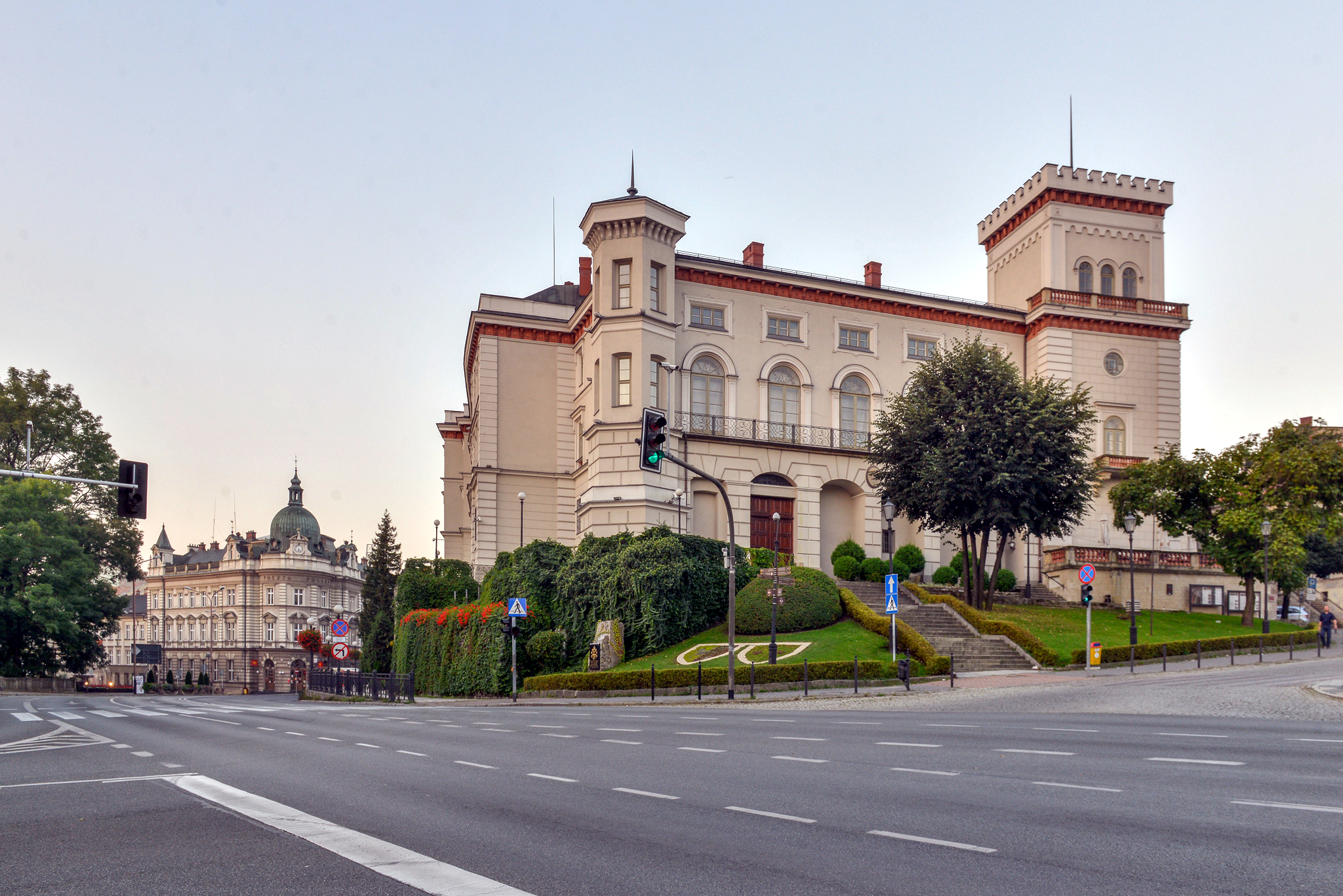
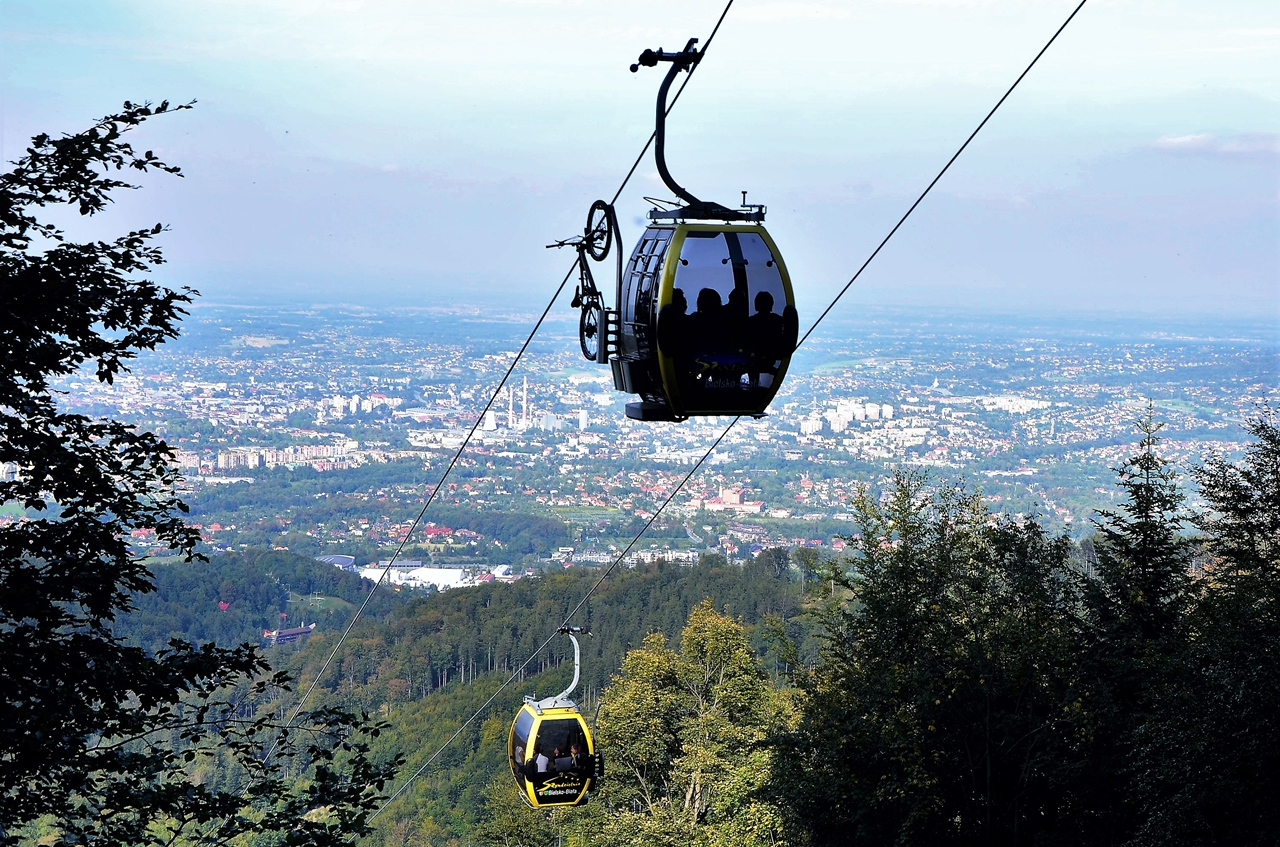
- Bielsko Marketplace Polish Theatre City Hall Frog House Sułkowski Castle and City Museum Gondola lift on Szyndzielnia

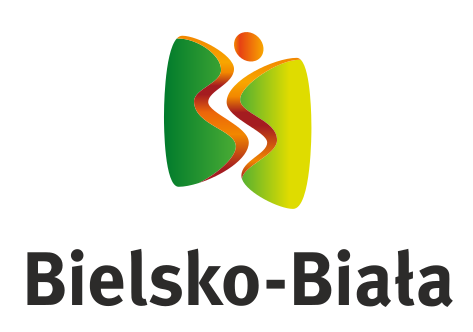
- Flag Coat of arms Brandmark

- Location within Poland
- Coordinates: 49°49′21″N 19°2′40″E
- Country: Poland
- Voivodeship: Silesian
- County: city county
- Town rights: Bielsko before 1312; Biała 1723 merged 1951

Government
  - City mayor: Jarosław Klimaszewski (PO)

Area
  - City county: 124.51 km^{2} (48.07 sq mi)
- Highest elevation: 1,117 m (3,665 ft)
- Lowest elevation: 262 m (860 ft)

Population (31 December 2024)
  - City county: 165,127 ▼ (22nd)
  - Density: 1,326.2/km^{2} (3,435/sq mi)
  - Metro: 335,000
- Demonym(s): bielszczanin (male) bielszczanka (female) (pl)
- Time zone: UTC+1 (CET)
  - Summer (DST): UTC+2 (CEST)
- Postal code: 43-300 to 43-382
- Area code: +48 33
- Car plates: SB
- Website: um.bielsko.pl

Bielsko-Biała (Polish: [ˈbjɛlskɔ ˈbjawa]; Silesian: Biylsko-Biołŏ; Czech: Bílsko-Bělá; German: Bielitz-Biala) is a city in the Silesian Voivodeship, southern Poland, with a population of approximately 166,765 as of December 2022, making it the 22nd largest city in Poland, and an area of 124.51 km^{2} (48.07 sq mi). It is the core of the broader metropolitan area with around 335,000 inhabitants. It serves as the seat of the Bielsko County, Euroregion Beskydy, Roman Catholic Diocese of Bielsko–Żywiec and the Evangelical Church Diocese of Cieszyn.

Situated north of the Beskid Mountains, Bielsko-Biała is composed of two former towns which merged in 1951—Bielsko in the west and Biała in the east—on opposite banks of the Biała River that divides the historical regions of Silesia and Lesser Poland. The history of Bielsko dates back to the 13th century, while Biała was founded in the 16th century and obtained city rights in 1723. Despite the administrative separation, both towns effectively functioned as one urban area already in the 19th century. Industrialization, especially the textile and automotive industries, was of great importance for its development in the past. Between 1975 and 1998, the city was the seat of Bielsko-Biała Voivodeship and currently lies within the Silesian Voivodeship.

Bielsko-Biała is the administrative, economic, academic and cultural centre for the Silesian-Lesser Polish border region, sometimes colloquially referred to as Podbeskidzie. (Note: Nevertheless, the use of this term is a subject of considerable controversy and is often rejected by people with a clear Silesian or Lesser Polish identity. See Borówka, Tomasz (6 November 2022). "Mamy na Śląsku wyimaginowaną krainę. Kto i kiedy właściwie wymyślił nazwę "Podbeskidzie"?" (in Polish). Ślązag.; Drost, Jacek (25 February 2016). "Co to jest Podbeskidzie? Podręcznik edukacji regionalnej utrwala taką nazwę" (in Polish). Dziennik Zachodni.; "Podbeskidzie? Małopolska? Górny Śląsk? Beskidy? – Czyli gdzie leży Żywiecczyzna". Stowarzyszenie Beskidzki Dom (in Polish). zywiec.info.pl. 22 May 2022.) It is also an important commercial and industrial hub, as well as a road and railway junction. It is a significant tourist destination due to its numerous architectural monuments (a popular slogan Little Vienna refers to many Revivalist and Art Nouveau buildings shaping the cityscape of the central districts) and its direct proximity to the mountains (fourteen mountain peaks lie within the city limits).

== Toponymy ==
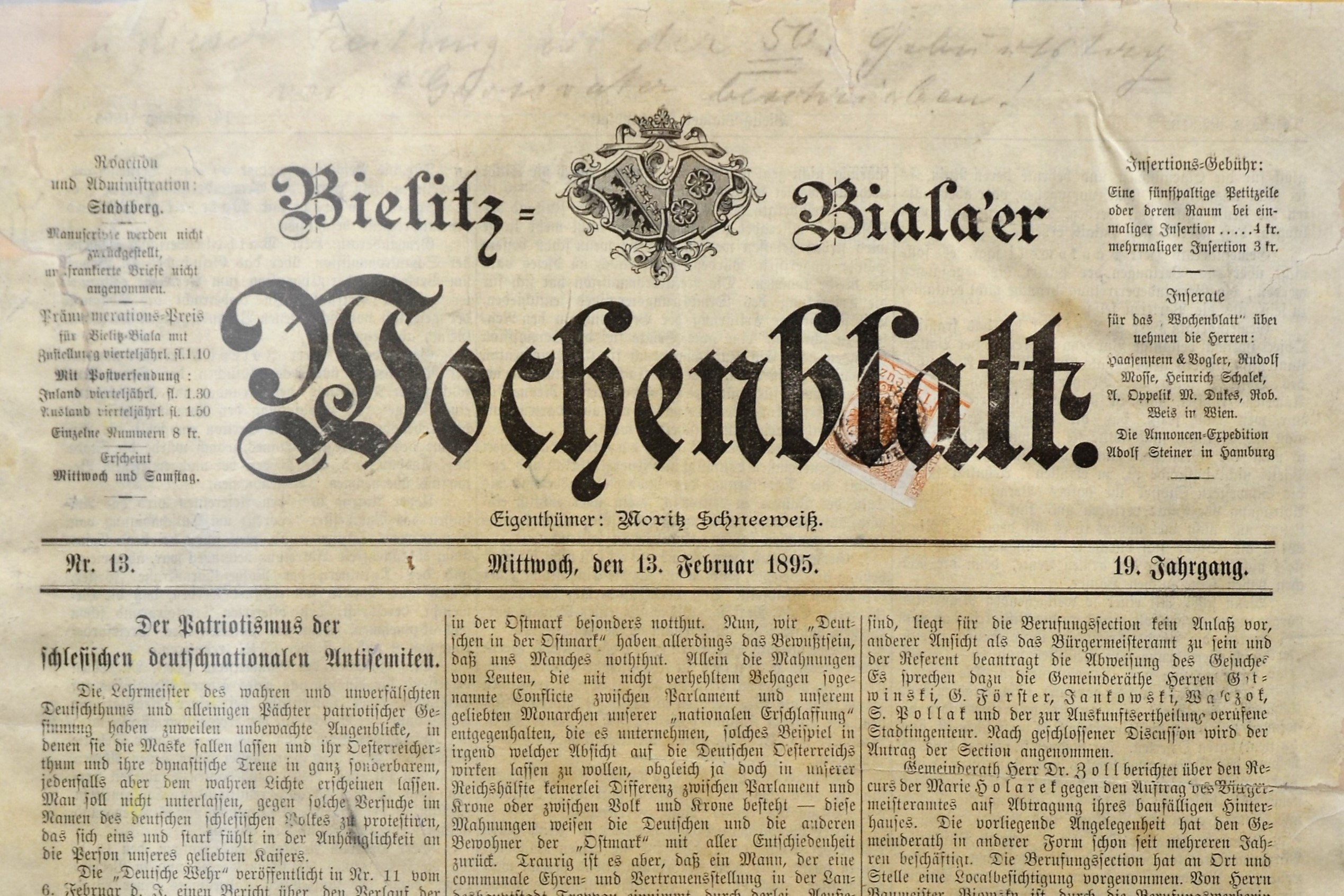
a German newspaper from the late 19th century whose title translates to "Bielsko-Biała Weekly"

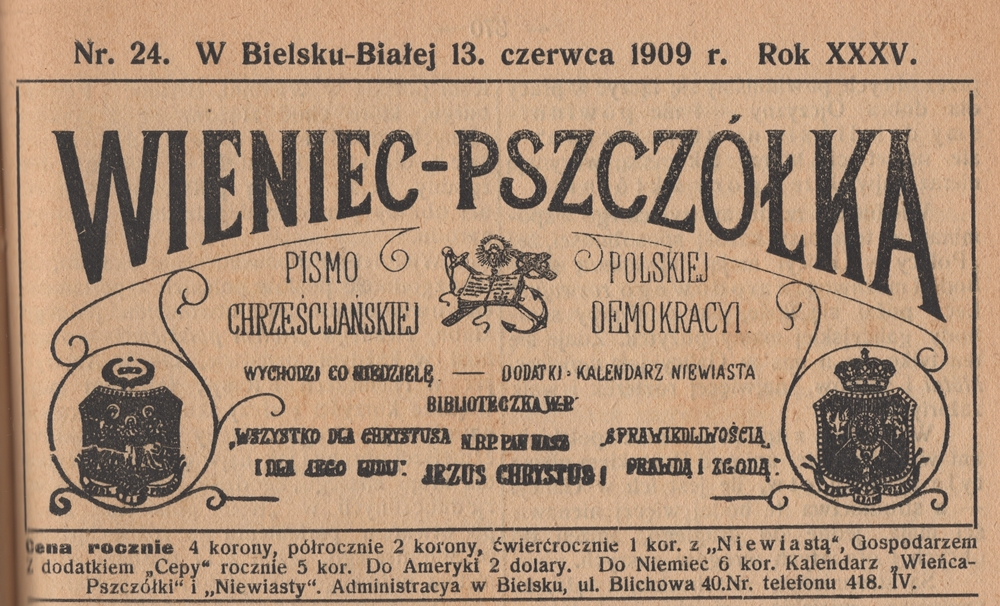
A Polish newspaper issued in 1909 "in Bielsko-Biała"

Both Bielsko and Biała derive their names from the Slavic stem *bělъ meaning "white" (in modern Polish biały, in modern Czech bílý). The river Biała was the first to be named in this way. The reason was probably the general impression of the color of the water: "white", that is, bright and clear. Some researchers also linked the city's name to the bleaching of fiber, which is questionable, however, due to the fact that in the 13th century the cloth industry in Bielsko was not yet developed.

The German name was derived from the Slavic one. In medieval and early modern documents, the name of the town appears both in a form close to modern Polish and Czech (Bilsko, Belsko) and German (Bilitz, Belicz, Bylitz). Over time, the official name Bielitz in German and Bílsko in Czech became established, while in Polish there were still various fluctuations in the 20th century, such as between Bielsko in the neuter gender and Bielsk in the masculine gender. In the case of Biała, the Polish wording of the name was the only official one, even when the town belonged to the Habsburg monarchy. The Germanized form Beil was used only in the local dialect. The Wymysorys language uses the form Byłc-Bejł which is close to how the two towns were called by the autochthonous German population.

The combined name Bielsko-Biała in Polish or Bielitz-Biala in German was used as early as the 19th century in the names of various societies, clubs, branches of institutions and businesses (e.g. Bielitz-Bialaer Leseverein, Bielitz-Bialaer Actienbrauerei or Bielsko-Bialski Związek Adwokatów), in the titles of local newspapers (e.g. Bielitz-Bialaer Anzeiger or Bielitz-Bialaer Wochenblatt), as the name of a railroad station, on maps printed jointly for both cities, and in many other publications.

== Geography ==
=== Location and relief ===
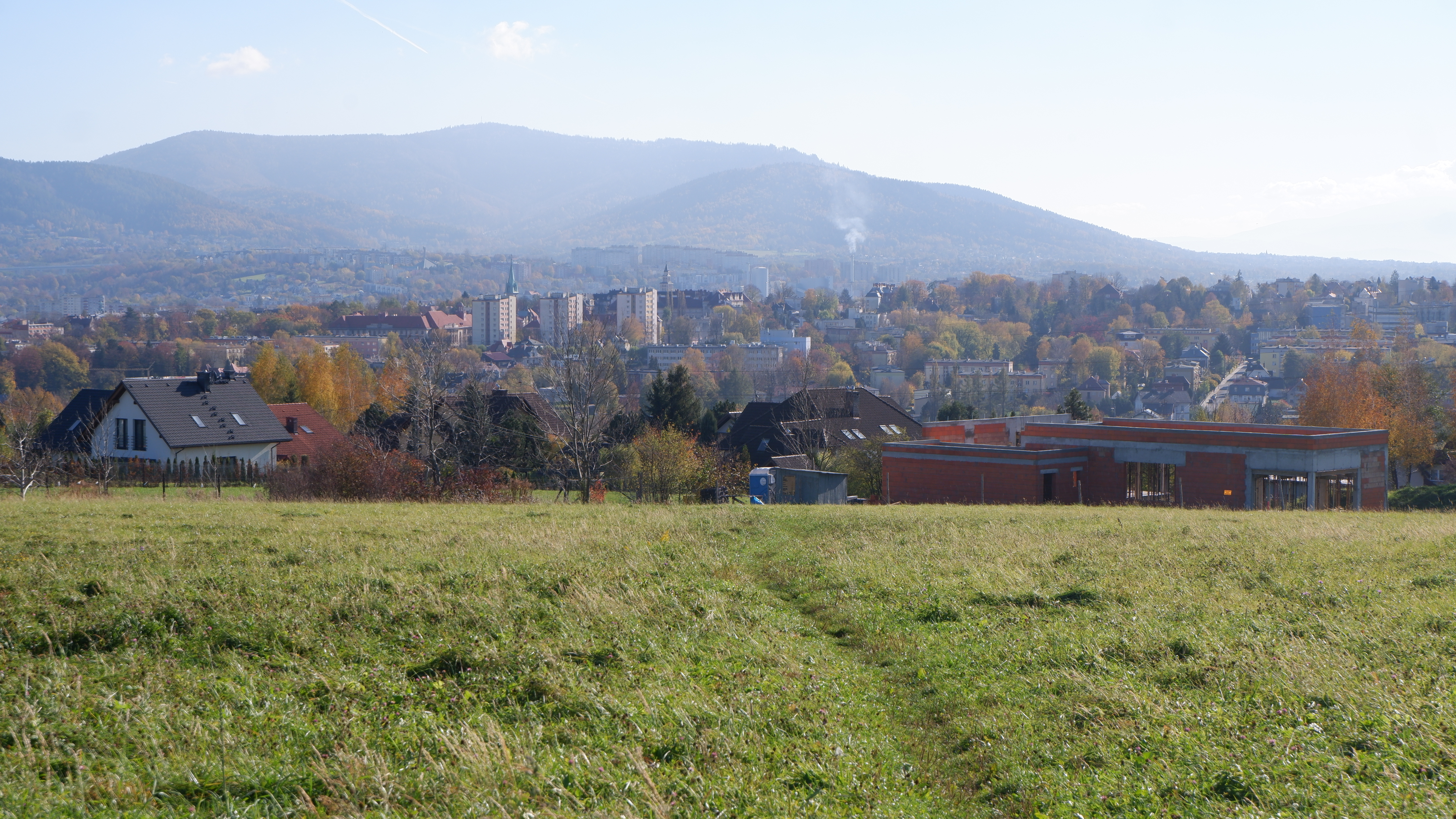
View from the Trzy Lipki hill towards the Silesian Beskids

Bielsko-Biała is located in the southern part of the Silesian Voivodeship, on the border of historical regions: Cieszyn Silesia (left-bank districts, 57.89% of the area) and Lesser Poland (right-bank districts, 42.11% of the area). The city represents 1.01% of the area of the voivodeship and 0.04% of the area of Poland. The latitudinal extent is approximately 13 km (8.1 mi) km and the meridional extent approximately 17.5 km (10.9 mi). The straight line distance from the city center to the Czech border is 31 km (19 mi), and to the Slovak border 35 km (22 mi).

The greater part of Bielsko-Biała lies in the Silesian Foothills (Pogórze Śląskie), which are part of the Western Beskid Foothills (Pogórze Zachodniobeskidzkie) physiographic macroregion. Within the administrative borders of Bielsko-Biała—in the southern districts—there are also mountain massifs of the Little Beskids (Beskid Mały) and the Silesian Beskids (Beskid Śląski). Most of the mountainous areas of Bielsko-Biała lie within two landscape parks: Little Beskids Landscape Park and Silesian Beskids Landscape Park. At the same time, they are protected under the Natura 2000 nature protection programme.

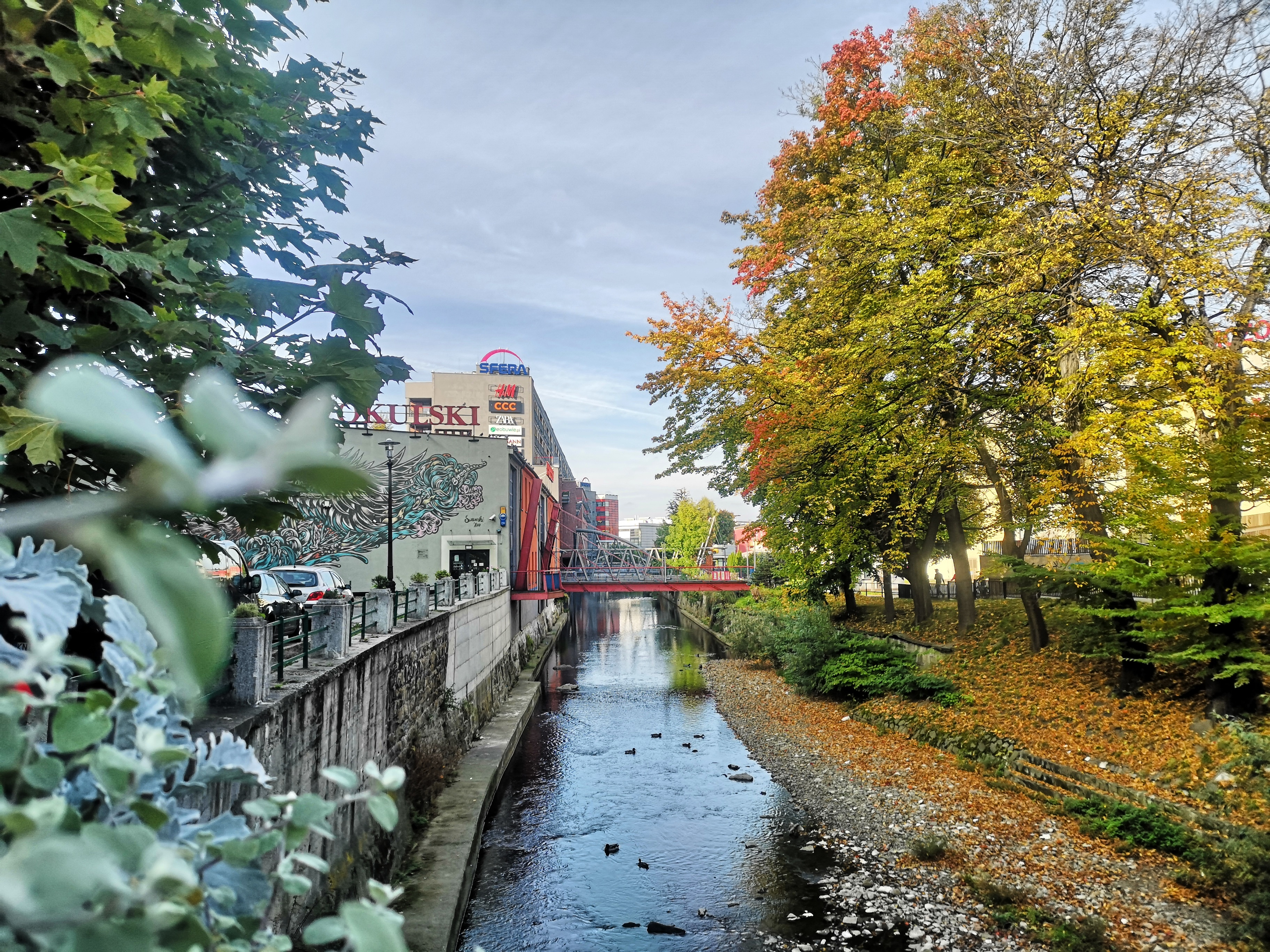
Biała River in the city centre

The relief of Bielsko-Biała is quite diverse. Within the administrative borders of the city there are both upland and mountainous areas. The centrally located Bolesław Chrobry Square is 313 m (1,027 ft) above sea level. The lowest point are Komorowice Ponds at 262 m (860 ft) above sea level, while the highest peak is Klimczok in Silesian Beskids at 1,117 m (3,665 ft) above sea level. The upland part of Bielsko-Biała consists of dozens of hills, separated by valleys of rivers and streams, the central one being the valley of the Biała River. The Beskid massifs are separated by the Wilkowice Gate (Brama Wilkowicka) connecting the Silesian Foothills (Pogórze Śląskie) with the Żywiec Basin (Kotlina Żywiecka). There are 14 mountain peaks within the city limits: Cyberniok, Dębowiec, Klimczok, Kołowrót, Kopany, Kozia Góra, Łysa Góra, Palenica, Przykra, Równia, Stołów, Szyndzielnia, Trzy Kopce and Wysokie. In addition, the slopes of Czupel, Gaiki and Magurka Wilkowicka mountains partly reach the peripheral districts of Bielsko-Biała. On the south-western slopes of Stołów is the Stołów Cave (Jaskinia w Stołowie), whose passages are 21 m (69 ft) long. In 2003, an entrance to the Deep Stołów Cave (Jaskinia Głęboka w Stołowie) was also discovered on the slopes of Stołów. With a length of 554 m (1,818 ft) and a depth of 25 m (82 ft), it is one of the largest caves in the Polish part of Carpathians. Several smaller caves can also be found in the Klimczok area.

=== Climate ===
Bielsko-Biała has an oceanic climate (Köppen: Cfb) with cold, damp winters and warm, wet summers. However, using the 0 °C isotherm, the climate is a Dfb-type called of humid continental climate, which explains its considerable thermal amplitude for Central Europe. The extremes may still be moderated by the western patterns and winds of this direction, which still maintains hybrid characteristics in the city's climate. Foëhn winds help maintain a milder winter in Bielsko-Biała and average about 4 °C lower than the surrounding mountains each year. The sunniest days are between late summer and early fall, with a few months reaching 9 sunny days. In the 1960s 55 cm of snow cover was recorded.

Climate data for Bielsko-Biała (1991–2020 normals, extremes 1951–present)
Month	Jan	Feb	Mar	Apr	May	Jun	Jul	Aug	Sep	Oct	Nov	Dec	Year
Record high °C (°F)	18.0 (64.4)	19.0 (66.2)	22.8 (73.0)	29.0 (84.2)	30.7 (87.3)	33.9 (93.0)	35.4 (95.7)	36.4 (97.5)	34.1 (93.4)	26.4 (79.5)	23.1 (73.6)	18.3 (64.9)	36.4 (97.5)
Mean daily maximum °C (°F)	2.2 (36.0)	3.5 (38.3)	7.6 (45.7)	14.1 (57.4)	18.6 (65.5)	21.9 (71.4)	24.0 (75.2)	23.9 (75.0)	18.6 (65.5)	13.5 (56.3)	8.2 (46.8)	3.3 (37.9)	13.3 (55.9)
Daily mean °C (°F)	−0.9 (30.4)	0.2 (32.4)	3.5 (38.3)	9.0 (48.2)	13.4 (56.1)	16.8 (62.2)	18.7 (65.7)	18.5 (65.3)	13.8 (56.8)	9.3 (48.7)	4.8 (40.6)	0.3 (32.5)	9.0 (48.2)
Mean daily minimum °C (°F)	−3.9 (25.0)	−3.0 (26.6)	−0.2 (31.6)	4.1 (39.4)	8.4 (47.1)	12.0 (53.6)	13.7 (56.7)	13.5 (56.3)	9.6 (49.3)	5.7 (42.3)	1.6 (34.9)	−2.6 (27.3)	4.9 (40.8)
Record low °C (°F)	−27.4 (−17.3)	−29.6 (−21.3)	−20.7 (−5.3)	−8.5 (16.7)	−3.1 (26.4)	−0.2 (31.6)	4.3 (39.7)	2.6 (36.7)	−2.4 (27.7)	−8.6 (16.5)	−19.8 (−3.6)	−26.0 (−14.8)	−29.6 (−21.3)
Average precipitation mm (inches)	45.2 (1.78)	46.6 (1.83)	58.6 (2.31)	67.8 (2.67)	128.7 (5.07)	131.6 (5.18)	143.2 (5.64)	92.0 (3.62)	110.2 (4.34)	72.7 (2.86)	56.8 (2.24)	45.2 (1.78)	998.3 (39.30)
Average extreme snow depth cm (inches)	21.2 (8.3)	27.4 (10.8)	19.7 (7.8)	9.9 (3.9)	0.5 (0.2)	0.0 (0.0)	0.0 (0.0)	0.0 (0.0)	0.0 (0.0)	4.1 (1.6)	9.5 (3.7)	14.2 (5.6)	27.4 (10.8)
Average precipitation days (≥ 0.1 mm)	17.03	16.34	15.57	13.93	16.80	15.73	15.60	12.77	13.13	14.20	14.57	15.77	181.44
Average snowy days (≥ 0 cm)	26.7	25.3	20.7	6.5	0.2	0.0	0.0	0.0	0.0	2.8	10.9	23.5	116.6
Average relative humidity (%)	81.4	78.5	73.6	67.3	71.4	72.8	71.9	72.3	77.5	79.0	80.8	82.4	75.7
Source 1: Institute of Meteorology and Water Management
Source 2: Meteomodel.pl (records, relative humidity 1991–2020)

=== Air pollution ===
Bielsko-Biała is a city with relatively high air pollution. According to a 2016 report by the World Health Organization, it was ranked as the twenty-seventh most polluted city in the European Union. Then in a 2020 report by the IQAir company, it was ranked thirty-eighth in Europe and fifth in Poland. The biggest contributor to air pollution is the fact that many households, including in the inner city area, still use traditional heating systems based on burning coal. The environmental situation in the city has been gradually improving in recent years. This is influenced by municipal measures such as the "Low Emission Economy Plan", which has been implemented since 2015. In 2020, 454 coal-fired boilers in residentional buildings were replaced by gas or district heating using municipal subsidies.

Bielsko-Biała belongs to the cities where the environmental condition has been gradually improving over the past few years. The number of days when the permissible daily concentration of suspended particulate matter PM10 was exceeded in the years 2018-2022 were as follows: 52, 30, 33, 41, 24, respectively.

The main contributors to air pollution are the use of outdated solid fuel sources in households, emissions of gases and particles from industrial plants, and traffic.

The operation of outdated heating systems and solid fuel combustion sources within the city promotes the formation of smog during the heating season. Smog has a negative impact on human health and can also have destructive effects on buildings, especially historical ones.

Pollution from traffic is concentrated within densely built-up areas known as "street canyons." The city's air quality is significantly influenced by transregional factors, such as the influx of pollutants from neighboring municipalities.

The quality of the water flowing through the city has been gradually improving. However, in 2022, the state of a significant portion of surface water, both in the Biała and Wapienica rivers, was classified as poor.

The city's ecological situation has been gradually improving in recent years, thanks in part to the actions of municipal authorities, such as the implementation of the "Low-Emission Economy Plan" since 2010. Between 2008 and 2022, with the city's support, over 7200 solid fuel boilers and furnaces were eliminated in residential buildings in Bielsko-Biała.

The municipal Energy Management Bureau in Bielsko-Biała was established in 1997 and now operates as an energy-management team within the city's Department of Environmental Protection and Energy.

In 2022, there were three monitoring stations in the city as part of the National Air Quality Monitoring System, and the city installed 36 air quality sensors in urban areas to depict the distribution of pollutants within the city [Source: Data from the Department of Environmental Protection and Energy, Municipal Office in Bielsko-Biała].

=== Districts ===
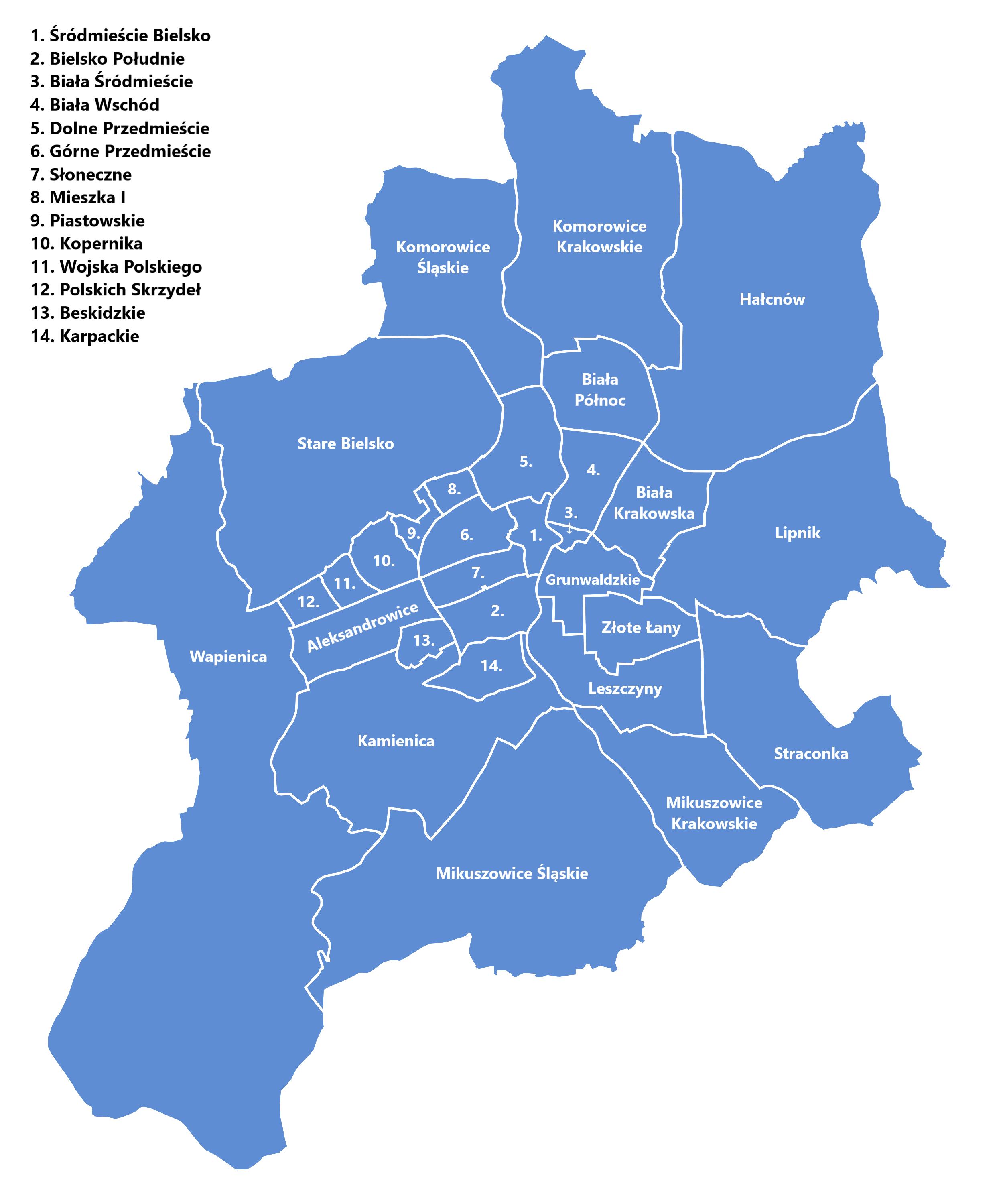
Division of Bielsko-Biała into osiedla / dzielnice

Bielsko-Biała is officially divided into 30 osiedla / dzielnice, which are auxiliary units of the municipality.

Aleksandrowice; Biała Krakowska; Biała Śródmieście; Biała Północ; Biała Wschód; Bielsko Południe; Dolne Przedmieście; Górne Przedmieście; Hałcnów; Kamienica; Komorowice Krakowskie; Komorowice Śląskie; Leszczyny; Lipnik; Mikuszowice Krakowskie	Mikuszowice Śląskie; Osiedle Beskidzkie; Osiedle Grunwaldzkie; Osiedle Karpackie; Osiedle Kopernika; Osiedle Mieszka I; Osiedle Piastowskie; Osiedle Polskich Skrzydeł; Osiedle Słoneczne; Osiedle Wojska Polskiego; Stare Bielsko; Straconka; Śródmieście Bielsko; Wapienica; Złote Łany

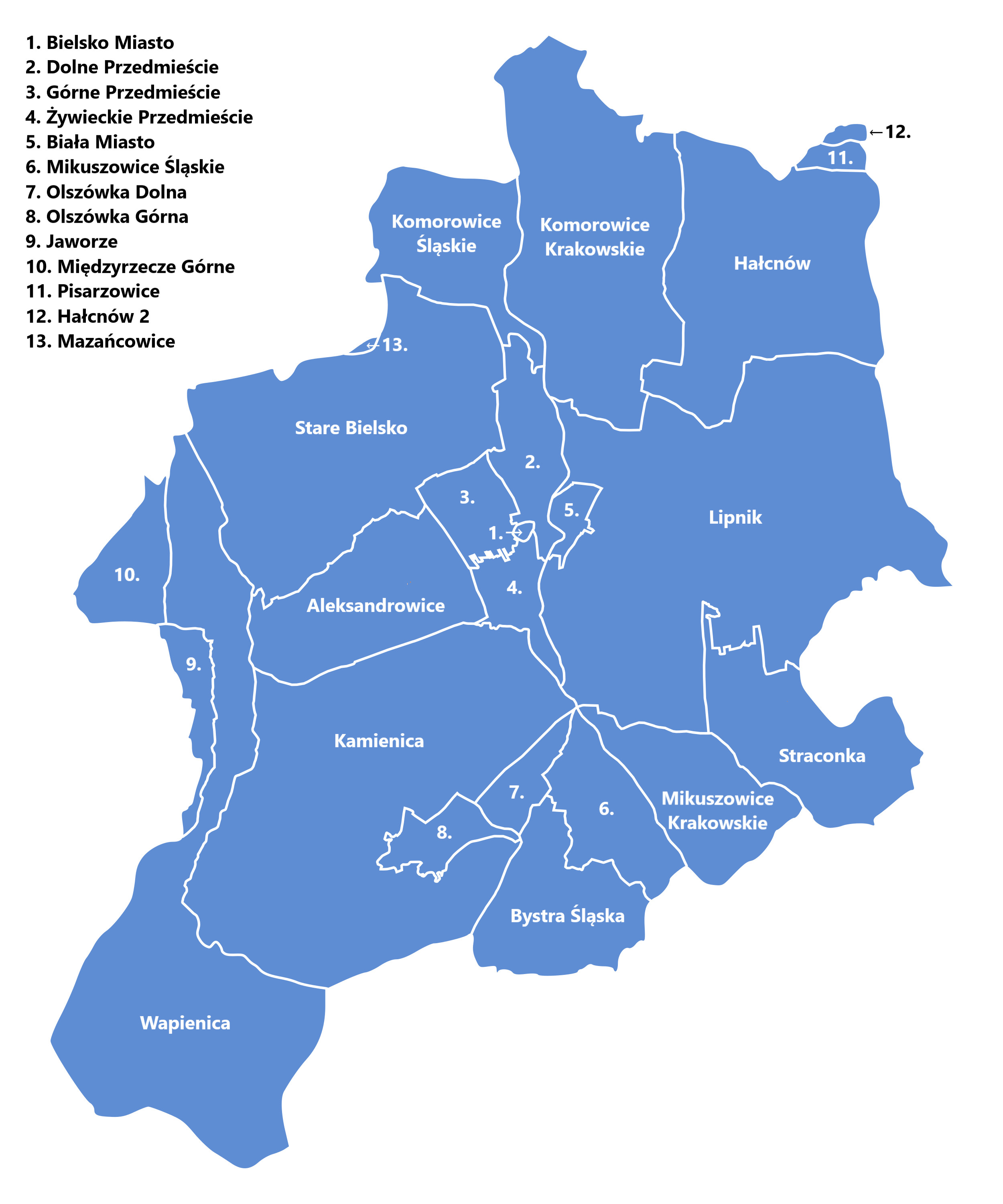
Division of Bielsko-Biała into obręby ewidencyjne

In parallel, there is a division into obręby ewidencyjne (cadastral areas), the boundaries of which reflect the former boundaries of the municipalities gradually incorporated into Bielsko-Biała in the 20th century, as well as the boundaries of the historical districts (suburbs) of Bielsko. These are:

- Bielsko Miasto (comprises the Old Town of Bielsko)
- Biała Miasto (comprises Biała within the original boundaries from the 18th century)
- Dolne Przedmieście (formally divided into thirteen small areas)
- Górne Przedmieście
- Żywieckie Przedmieście
- Aleksandrowice
- Hałcnów and Hałcnów 2
- Lipnik
- Kamienica
- Komorowice Śląskie
- Komorowice Krakowskie
- Mikuszowice Śląskie
- Mikuszowice Krakowskie
- Olszówka Dolna
- Olszówka Górna
- Stare Bielsko
- Straconka
- Wapienica

Some peripheral areas are also included within obręby ewidencyjne of Bystra Śląska, Jaworze, Mazańcowice, Międzyrzecze Górne and Pisarzowice, which is a result of the incorporation of parts of these villages into Bielsko-Biała. In some cases (e.g. Mikuszowice Krakowskie, Stare Bielsko, Straconka) the boundaries of osiedla and obręby ewidencyjne are similar, in many others (e.g. Aleksandrowice, Dolne Przedmieście, Lipnik, Mikuszowice Śląskie) osiedla and obręby ewidencyjne with the same names do not correspond territorially. The commons understanding of 'districts' in Bielsko-Biała and the belonging of particular areas to them draws loosely on both types of division.

== History ==
=== Bielsko ===
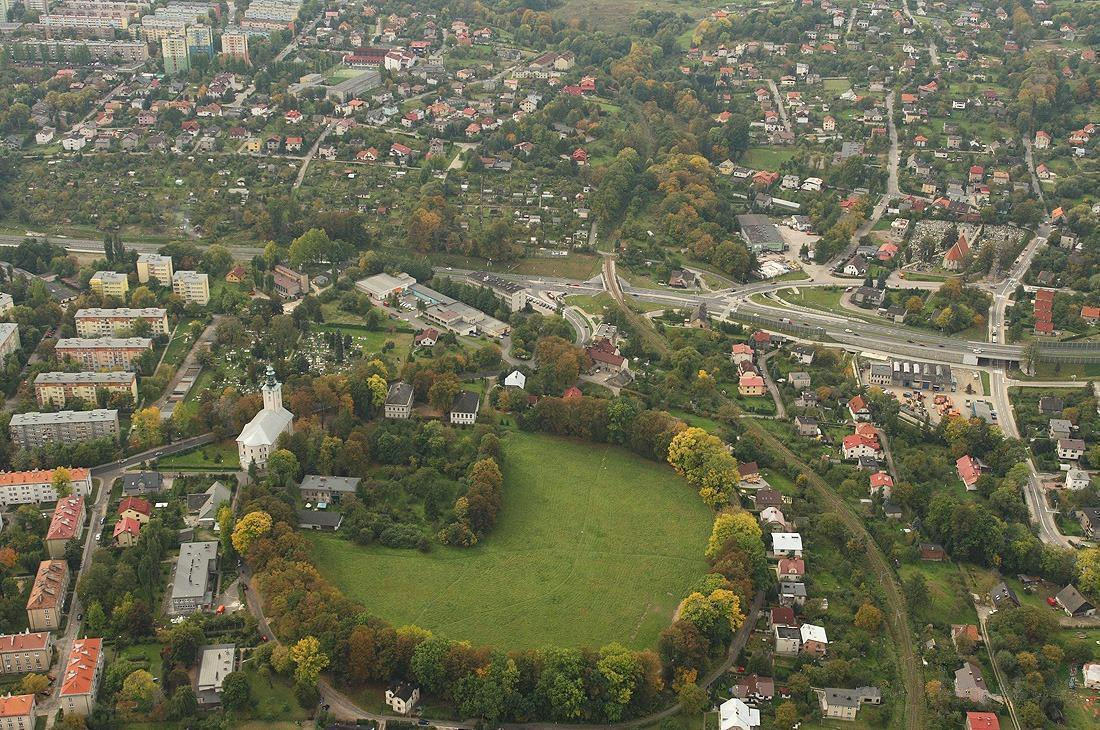
Remnats of the Stare Bielsko hillfort

There has been human habitation in Bielsko since around 1400 BC, wooden tools have been found along with stone axes dating from 1000 BC. The remnants of a fortified settlement in what is now the Stare Bielsko (Old Bielsko) district of the city were discovered between 1933 and 1938 by a Polish archaeological team. The settlement was dated to the 12th – 14th centuries. Its dwellers manufactured iron from ore and specialized in smithery. The current centre of the town was probably developed as early as the first half of the 13th century. At that time a castle (which still survives today) was built on a hill.

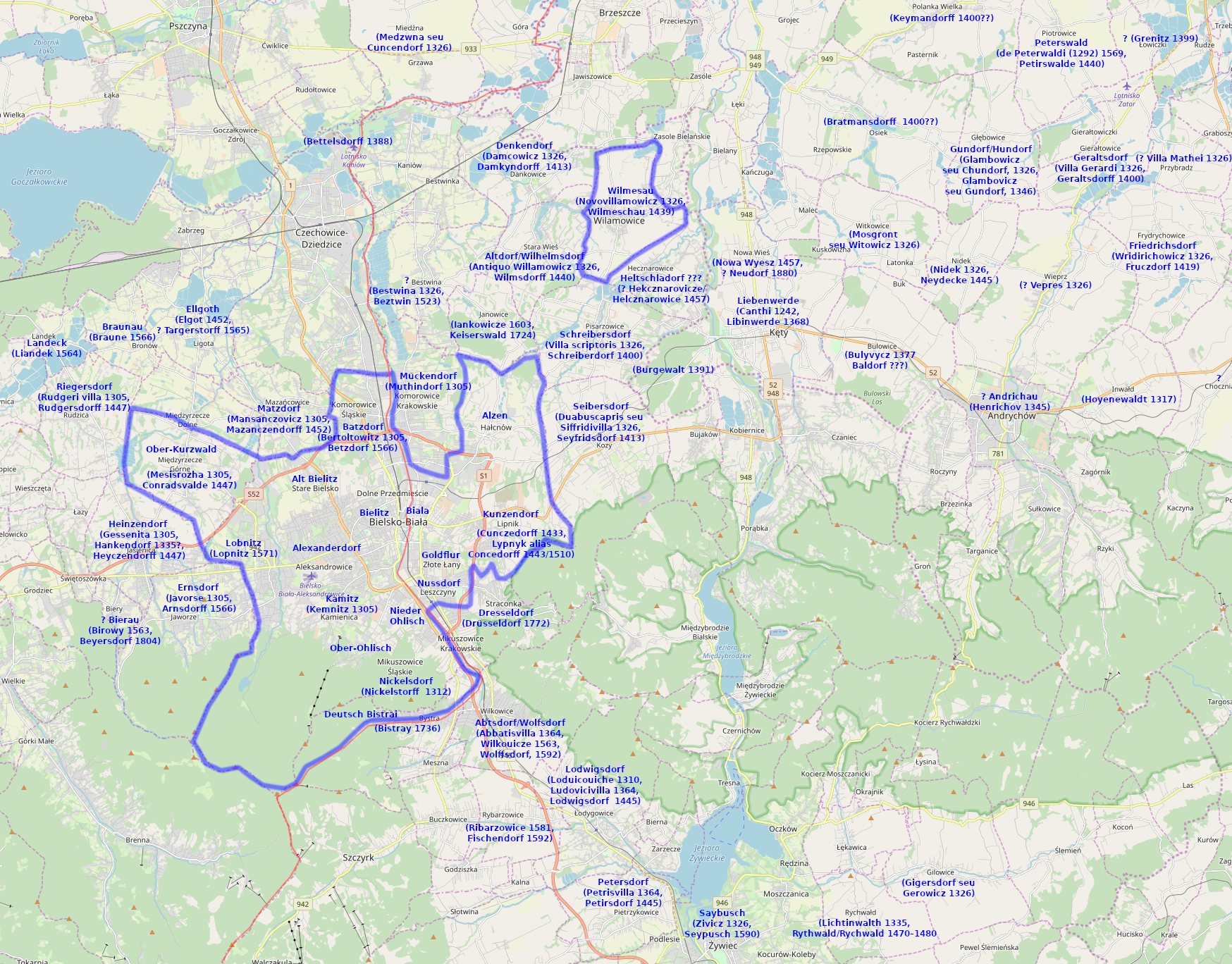
Boundaries of the Bielsko-Biała German linguistic island (Bielitz-Bialaer Sprachinsel)

In the second half of the 13th century, the Piast dukes of Opole invited German settlers to colonize the Silesian Foothills. As the dukes then also ruled over the Lesser Poland lands east of the Biała River, settlements arose on both banks like Bielitz (now Stare Bielsko), Nickelsdorf (Mikuszowice Śląskie), Kamitz (Kamienica), Batzdorf (Komorowice Śląskie) and Kurzwald in the west as well as Kunzendorf (Lipnik), Alzen (Hałcnów) and Wilmesau (Wilamowice) in the east. Nearby settlements in the mountains were Lobnitz (Wapienica) and Bistrai (Bystra). Those settlements did not undergo Slavonicisation in the following centuries, which led to the creation of a German language island (Bielitz-Bialaer Sprachinsel) that survived until the 20th century.

After the partition of the Duchy of Opole in 1281, Bielsko passed to the Dukes of Cieszyn within fragmented Poland. The town was first documented in 1312 when Duke Mieszko I of Cieszyn granted a town charter. The Biała again became a border river, when in 1315 the eastern Duchy of Oświęcim split off from Cieszyn as a separate under Mieszko's son Władysław. After the Dukes of Cieszyn had become vassals of the Bohemian kings in 1327 and the Duchy of Oświęcim was sold to the Polish Crown in 1457, returning to Lesser Poland after three centuries, the Biała River for next centuries marked the border between the Bohemian crown land of Silesia within the Holy Roman Empire and the Lesser Poland Province of the Kingdom of Poland and the Polish–Lithuanian Commonwealth.

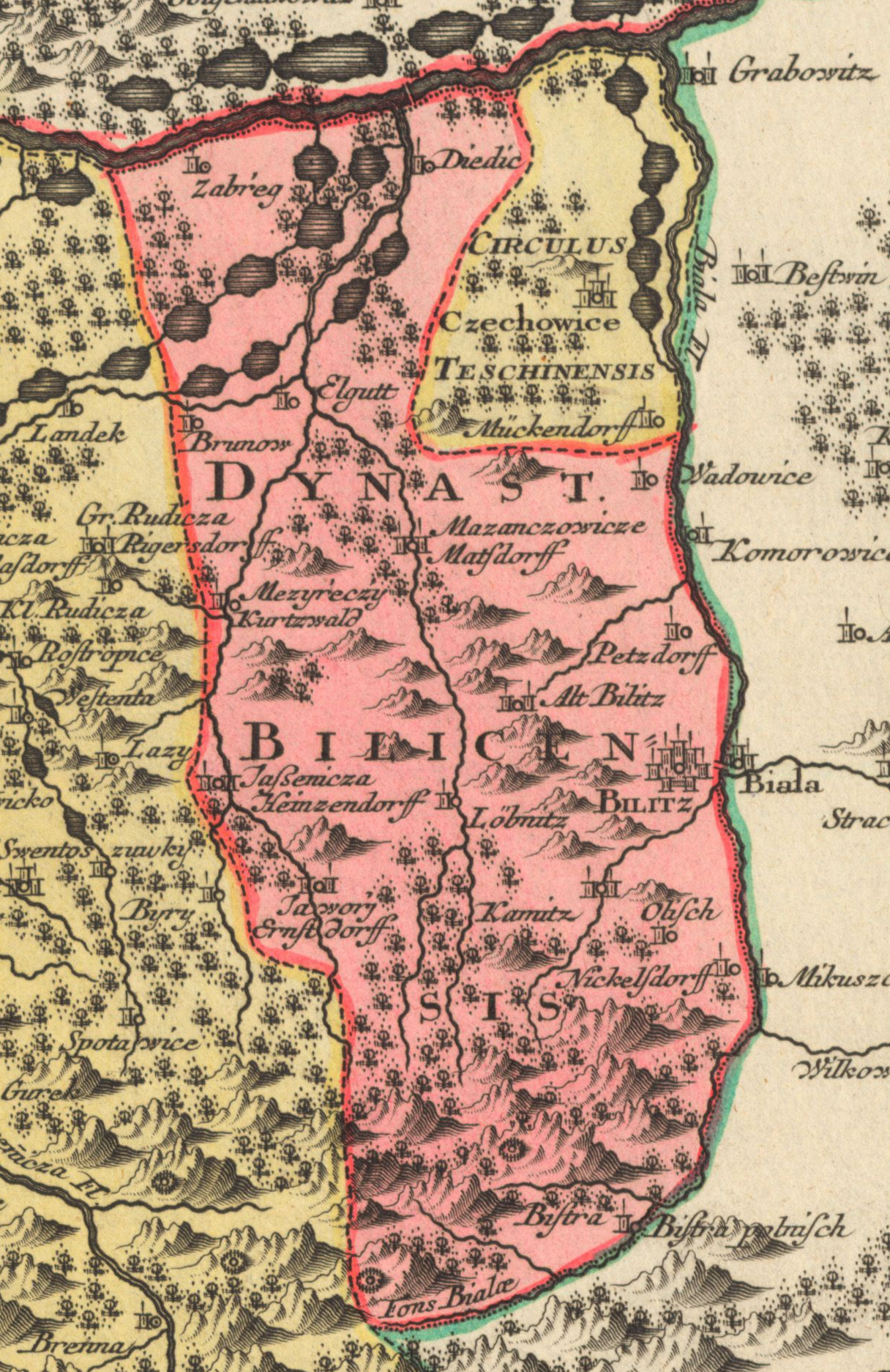
Duchy of Bielsko

With Bohemia and the Upper Silesian Duchy of Cieszyn, Bielsko in 1526 was inherited by the Austrian House of Habsburg and incorporated into the Habsburg monarchy. From 1560 Bielsko was held by Frederick Casimir of Cieszyn, son of Duke Wenceslaus III Adam, who due to the enormous debts his son left upon his death in 1571, had to sell it to the Promnitz noble family at Pless. With the consent of Emperor Maximilian II, the Promnitz dynasty and their Schaffgotsch successors ruled the Duchy of Bielsko as a Bohemian state country; acquired by the Austrian chancellor Count Friedrich Wilhelm von Haugwitz in 1743, and afterwards by Polish aristocrat Aleksander Józef Sułkowski in 1752, the ducal status was finally confirmed by Empress Maria Theresa in 1754. It remained in possession of the Polish Sułkowski family until the dissolution of the duchy in 1849, while the castle was still owned by the Sułkowskis until World War II.

Bielsko was the first town in the Duchy of Cieszyn where the teachings of Martin Luther spread in the late 1530s, even before Duke Wenceslaus III Adam adopted Lutheranism in 1545. Also later, Bielsko was home to the strongest Protestant community in the whole of Cieszyn Silesia, which in 1587 obtained a privilege guaranteeing that only Lutheran services would be held in the town. Jiří Třanovský was active in the Bielsko castle. Bielsko retained its Protestant character also after the Thirty Years' War. The recatholisation campaign, which started in the second half of the 17th century, was not very successful. Throughout the Counter-Reformation period, Lutheran services were held—at first in the Holy Trinity Church with the permission of the authorities, later in homes or in the surrounding Beskid forests (the so-called forest churches)—and immediately after the issuing of the Patent of Toleration by Emperor Joseph II in 1781, an Evangelical district was established north of the historical centre, with the Church of the Saviour, the present seat of the Lutheran bishop and schools, known as the Bielsko Zion (Bielski Syjon). To this day, it remains a Protestant cultural centre of supra-regional significance. In 1900, a monument to Martin Luther was unveiled there. It was one of only two in the whole of Austria-Hungary (the other was erected in the Bohemian town of Aš), and now is the only one within the borders of Poland. In the second half of the 19th century, Lutherans ceased to constitute the majority of the population due to the influx of new inhabitants, mostly Catholic or Jewish.

After the Prussian king Frederick the Great had invaded Silesia, Bielsko remained with the Habsburg monarchy as part of Austrian Silesia according to the 1742 Treaty of Breslau. In late 1849 Bielsko became a seat of political district. In 1870 it became a statutory city.

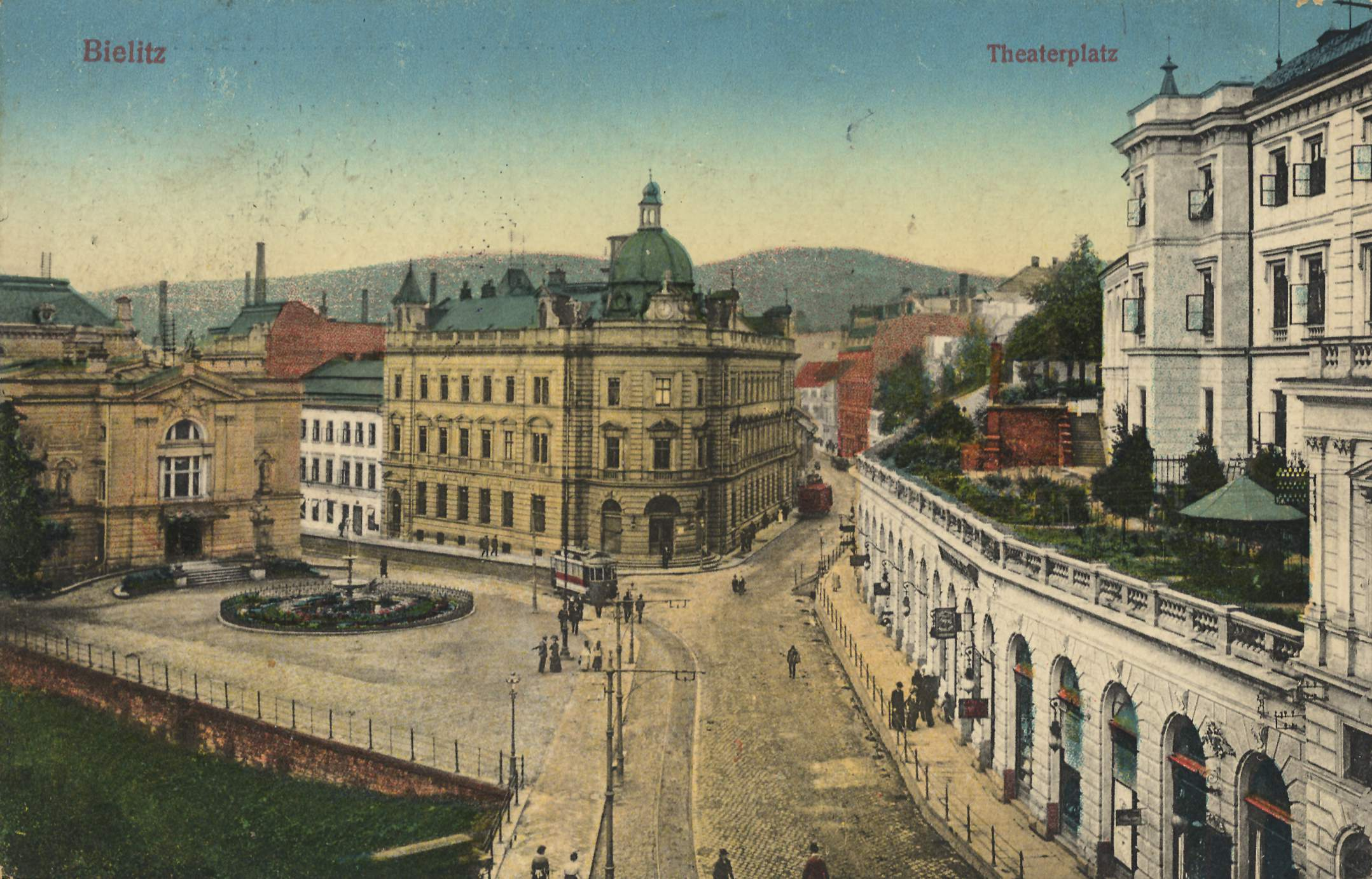
From left: the theater, the main post office and the Bielsko Castle

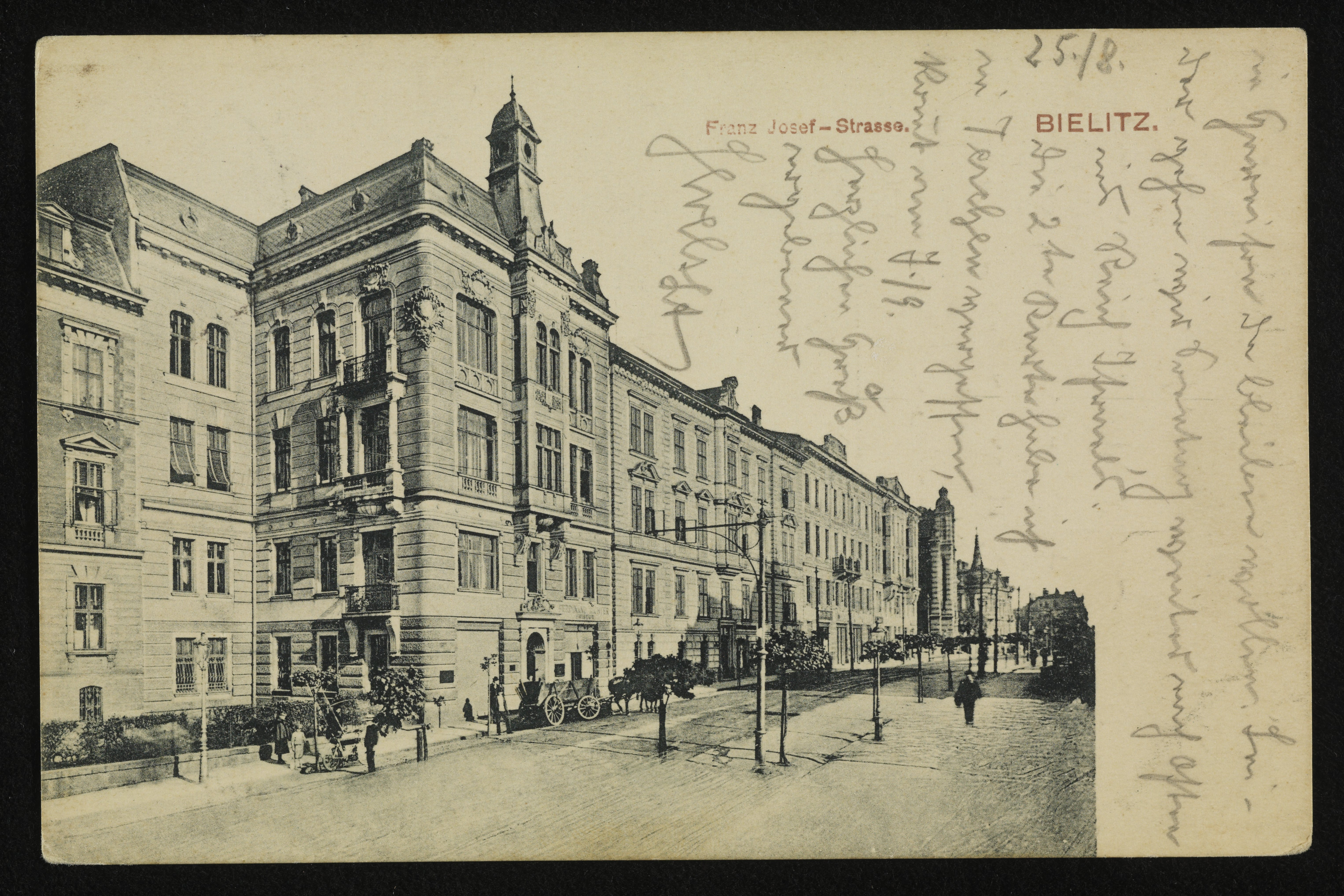
A 1905 postcard of Franz-Josef-Strasse (now 3 Maja Street) connecting the Old Town with the railway station

The town's development in the 19th century was primarily linked to the textile industry, and to a lesser extent the engineering industry. The Bielsko-Biała area was described as the third largest centre of the textile industry in the Austro-Hungarian monarchy, after Brno and Liberec. In the second half of the 19th century, new tenements, villas of wealthy industrialists and public buildings in Revival and Art Nouveau styles began to spring up in the landscape of the city. These were often inspired by the architecture of Vienna, to which the slogan "Little Vienna", which is still popular today, refers. The local architect of the Jewish origin Carl Korn had the greatest influence on the architecture of the late 19th and early 20th centuries, shaping the character of "Little Vienna", while the plan for urban regulation was prepared in 1899 by the Viennese urban planner Max Fabiani. In 1855 a branch of the Emperor Ferdinand Northern Railway was built from Dziedzice to Bielsko, which in 1877 was extended to Żywiec and connected to the Galician Transversal Railway. A 268 metres (879 ft) long tunnel under the centre of Bielsko was then built. In 1888, a railway connection to Cieszyn and Kalwaria Zebrzydowska was opened. In 1895, an electric tram line was established in Bielsko. It connected the railway station with Zigeunerwald/Cygański Las, which in the meantime was transformed into a forest-park complex on the model of the Vienna Forest with many summer villas of Bielsko's factory owners built in its surroundings.

However, the demographic boom was weaker than, for example, in the Upper Silesian conurbation, due to the restriction of the settlement of workers in the city proper. Many of them lived in the surrounding villages, which formally remained separate, even though they were taking on an increasingly urban character. According to the 1910 census, Bielsko had a population of 18,568. 84.3% used German in their domestic interactions, 14.3% used Polish, 0.7% used Czech or Slovak, and 0.7% used another language. 55.9% were Roman Catholic, 27.6% Lutheran, 16.3% Jewish, and 1.1% were of another denomination or with no religion.

After 1918, when Austria-Hungary collapsed, Bielsko found itself within a disputed territory between Poland and Czechoslovakia. Attempts to incorporate the city into the Republic of German-Austria failed. In July 1920, the Conference of Ambassadors decided to divide Cieszyn Silesia in such a way that Bielsko became part of the autonomous Silesian Voivodeship in the Second Polish Republic.

Political life during the interwar period was marked by ethnic and national tensions. The influx of Polish officials and teachers increased the proportion of the Polish population, although the city retained a significant German-speaking community.

In the 1930s, some ethnic German residents, under the leadership of Rudolf Wiesner, organized the Jungdeutsche Partei, an anti-Polish and antisemitic political movement that functioned as a de facto branch of the NSDAP. A considerable number of young Germans joined the party during the mid-1930s.

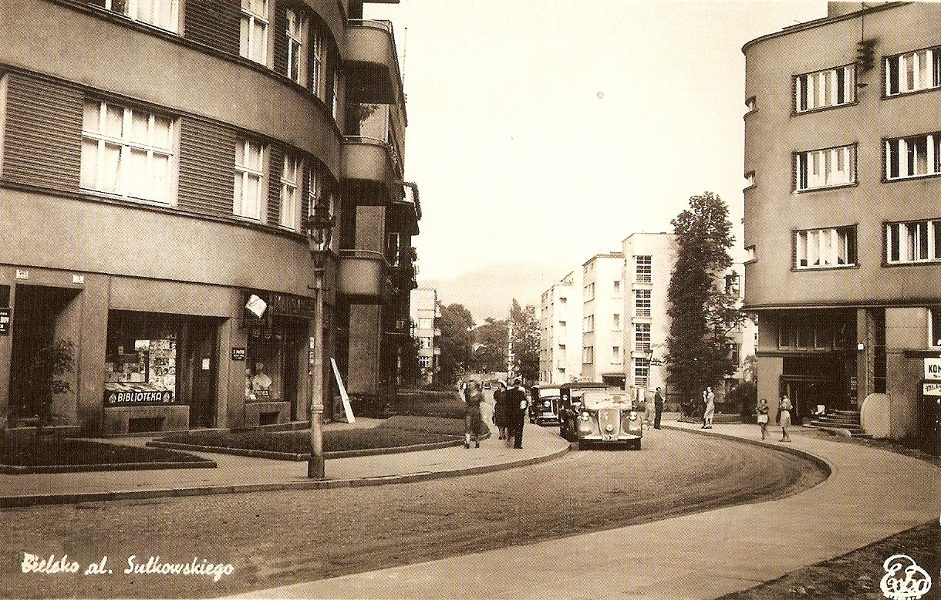
New residential district built in the 1930s

The interwar period also brought significant urban development. A new residential district in Modernist style was built beginning in 1934 on the site of the former castle gardens, and the first Polish high school (today the Nicolaus Copernicus High School) was opened in 1927. In 1938, the nearby municipality of Aleksandrowice was incorporated into the city, where an airport and a pilot school were established.

=== Biała ===
The territorial evolution of Biała over centuries

The history of Biała dates back to the second half of the 16th century. The first written mention comes from 1564 and describes a small craftsmen settlement of thirteen houses. It was located near the mouth of Niwka to the Biała River, in the area of today's Łukowa Street. Administratively, it belonged to the Silesian County of the Kraków Voivodeship within the Kingdom of Poland. The first residents most likely came from the suburbs of neighboring Bielsko. They crossed to the other side of the river tempted by the opportunity to build new houses in the face of restrictions imposed by the Bielsko town council and disputes between the suburban population and the privileged burghers of the Old Town. The settlement was established on the land of the village of Lipnik, from which it became independent in 1613. Further development of the village was associated with the influx of refugees from neighboring Silesia during the Thirty Years' War and the Counter-Reformation.

Though already named a town in the 17th century, Biała officially was granted borough rights by the Polish king Augustus II the Strong in 1723. At that time it counted only 40 inhabited houses and about 300 residents, mostly German-speaking and Lutheran. There has been a new urban layout made, in the center of which was a rectangular market square - today's Wojska Polskiego Square.

In the course of the First Partition of Poland in 1772, Biała was annexed by the Habsburg Empire and incorporated into the crownland of Galicia. After that the town underwent major urban transformations in the 1780s in connection with the construction of the Central Galician Road, part of which is today's 11 Listopada Street. At that time, the New Market was also delineated - the present Wolności Square.

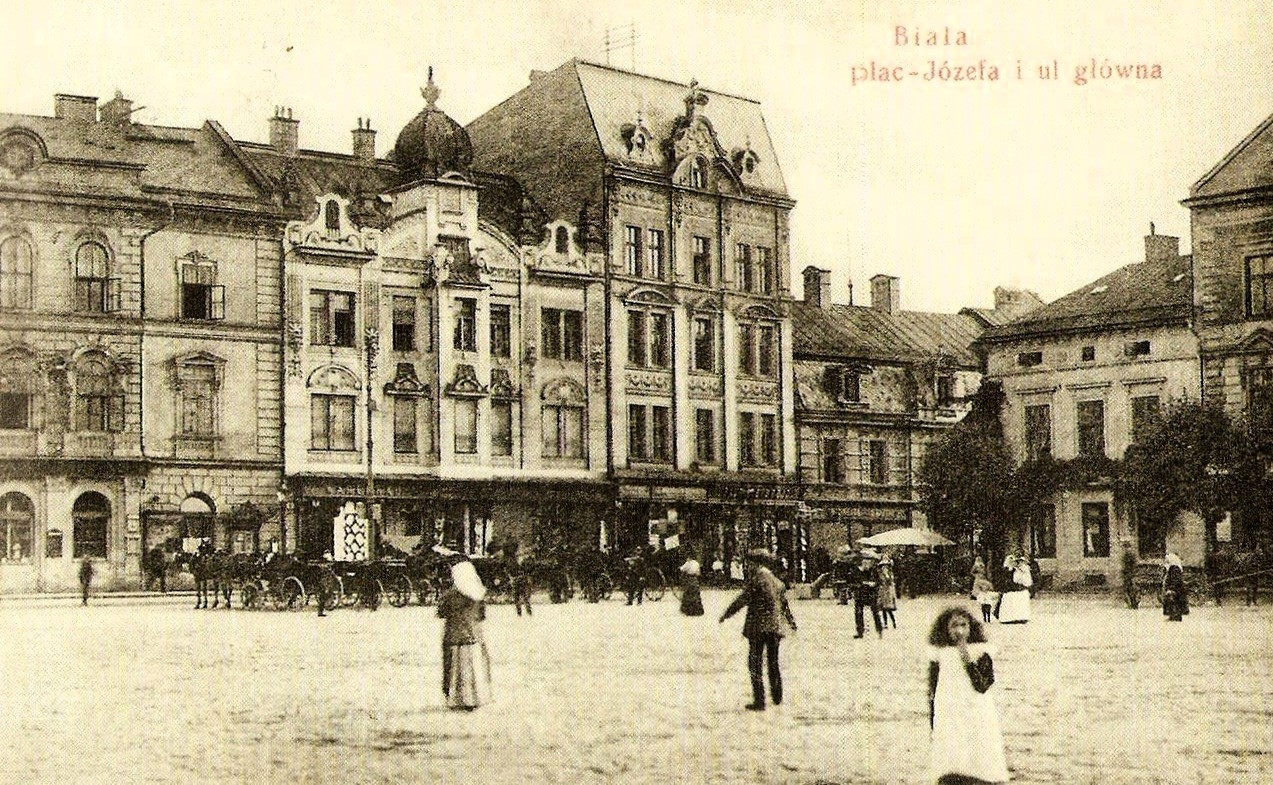
Market Square in Biała around 1910

The town's boundaries were artificially limited as a result of disputes with the Lipnik municipality, which refused to give up part of its territory, even though the western part of Lipnik formed an urban and functional unity with Biała. West Lipnik also formed the de facto Jewish quarter of Biała, due to the official ban on Jewish settlement in the town, which was in effect from 1757 to 1848. Joachim Adler's cloth factory, considered the first mechanized factory in the Bielsko-Biala area, was also established within Lipnik's borders in 1810. Lipnik was finally incorporated into Biała in 1925. The town thus expanded its territory more than sixteen times (before 1925 it had only 1.22 square kilometres (0.47 sq mi), while Lipnik had 20.76 square kilometres (8.02 sq mi)), and the population increased two and a half times.

In the 19th century, Biała formed a single industrial region with Bielsko, also with a predominance of textile industry. From 1867 it was the capital of Biała County. At the turn of the 20th century, a number of "Vienna-like" buildings were constructed in Biała, too, including a pompous Neo-Renaissance town hall in 1895–1897.

According to the 1910 census, Biała had a population of 8,668. 69.3% used German in their domestic interactions, 29.3% used Polish, and 1.4% used another language (mainly Czech or Ukrainian). 72.1% were Roman Catholic, 17.7% Jewish and 12.3% Lutheran. Of the remaining 0.9%, there were small groups of Greek Catholics, Orthodox Christians, Calvinists and five people with no religion.

With the dissolution of Austria-Hungary in 1918, Biała became part of the Second Polish Republic. Throughout the interwar period it belonged to the Kraków Voivodeship. From 1925, the official name of the town was Biała Krakowska.

=== Bielsko-Biała ===
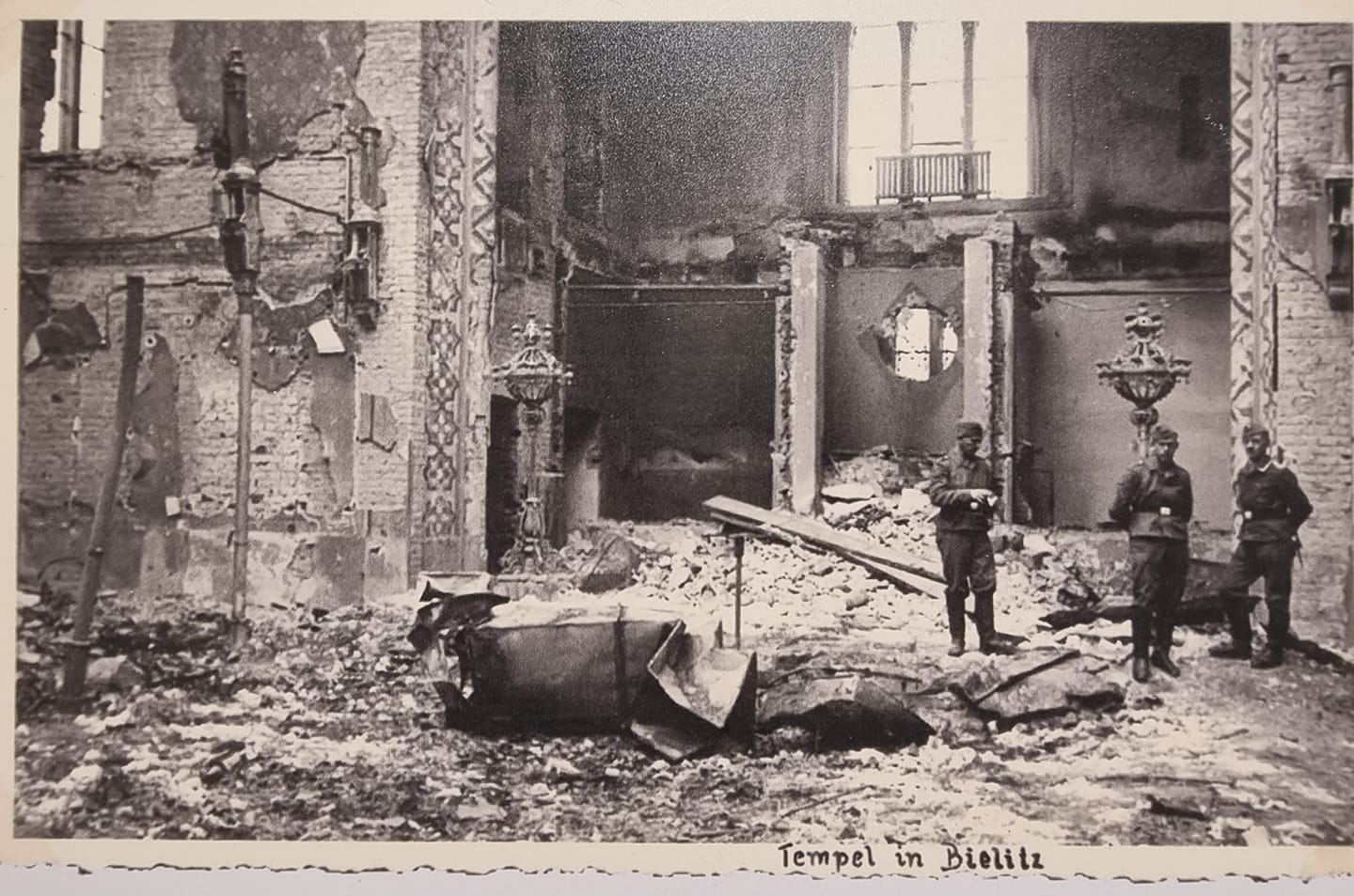
German soldiers in the ruins of a destroyed synagogue in 1939

Although the two towns effectively functioned as one urban area for a long time, they were administratively combined for the first time by the Nazi authorities after the invasion of Poland in September 1939. Biała became a district of Bielsko under the name Bielitz-Ost. During the World War II, the city was occupied by the Nazi Germany, within the province of Upper Silesia. Germans committed various crimes against the Polish and Jewish population. Several Polish teachers and principals were deported to Nazi concentration camps and murdered there. Many Jewish residents were murdered at the nearby Auschwitz extermination camp. Only less than 1000 people of the city's Jewish community of nearly 8000 survived the war. Several widely known Holocaust survivors from Bielsko-Biała were Roman Frister, Gerda Weissmann Klein and Kitty Hart-Moxon, all of whom wrote accounts of their experiences during the war. However, when it comes to material losses, the city survived the war almost intact. It was not bombed, and fighting during the Soviet offensive in the winter of 1945 was limited to today's peripheral districts, such as Hałcnów and the eastern part of Lipnik.

After World War II, the ethnic structure of the place changed. Most of the German population was expelled and those who remained assimilated with the Poles. In the 21st century, there is only a small German minority circle in the town. Poles transferred from the eastern areas that had been annexed to the USSR, as well as new settlers from central Poland, especially Lesser Poland, came to Bielsko-Biała.

The new Polish authorities initially restored the pre-war borders, including the division into Bielsko and Biała in two different voivodeships. But soon the decision to re-unify the two towns was made. The new municipality under the name Bielsko-Biała was created on 1 January 1951. Until 1975, it was part of the Katowice Voivodeship.

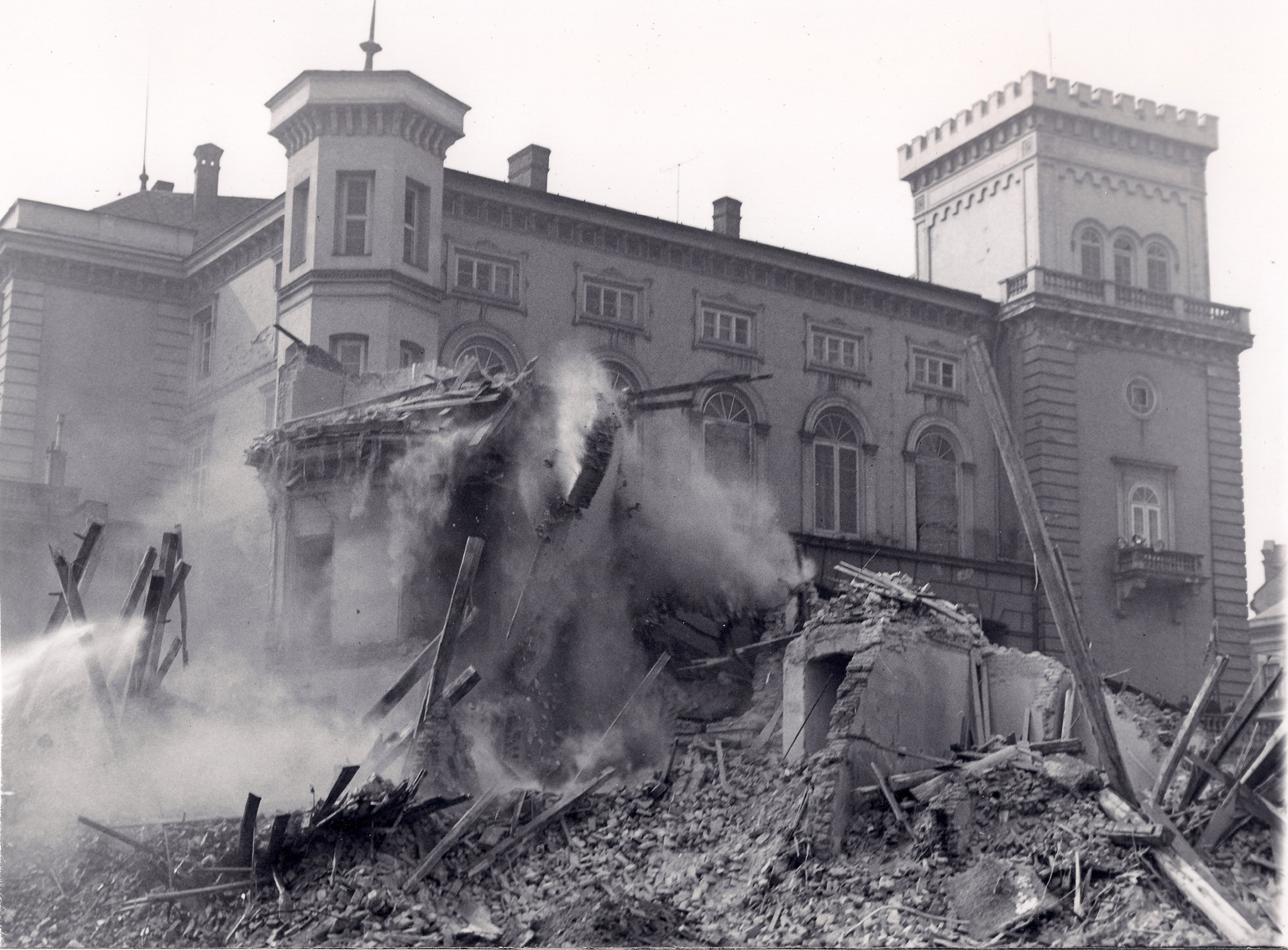
Demolition of the so-called Castle Markets to build a two-lane thoroughfare through the inner city in 1974

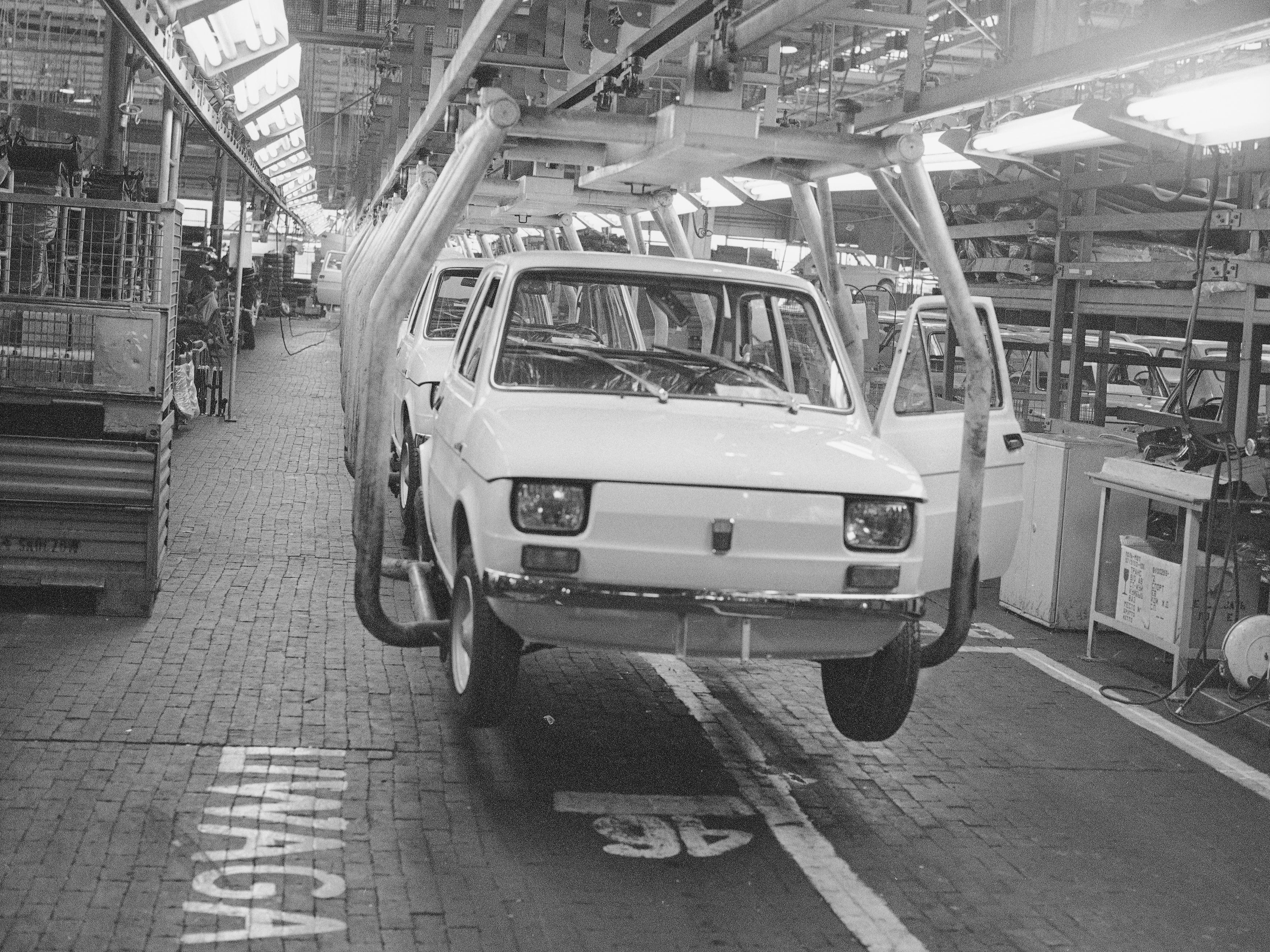
Production of the Polski Fiat 126p "Maluch" in the FSM factory (1970s)

In post-war Poland, the city has remained an important centre of textile industry (second only to Łódź), alongside which new branches have developed: in 1946 the Gliding Institute was established and in 1948 the car engine plant WSM, on the basis of which the FSM Automobile Factory was founded in 1972. The factory was born from an agreement between the FSO and Fiat for the construction of a new model, the Polski Fiat 126p, Polish version of Fiat 126 commonly known as Maluch. A huge industrial complex has been built in the northern part of the city. Thousands of people came from all over Poland to work then; in the 1970s Bielsko-Biała observed the biggest population boom in its history. The influx of new residents was associated with the construction of new housing estates with large panel system-buildings, like Złote Łany (1970–1975), Wojska Polskiego (1976–1980), Beskidzkie (1976–1982) or Karpackie (1979–1982). The population has also increased due to the incorporation of surrounding communes: Kamienica and Mikuszowice (together with Olszówka) in 1969, Straconka in 1973, Stare Bielsko, Komorowice, Hałcnów and Wapienica in 1977.

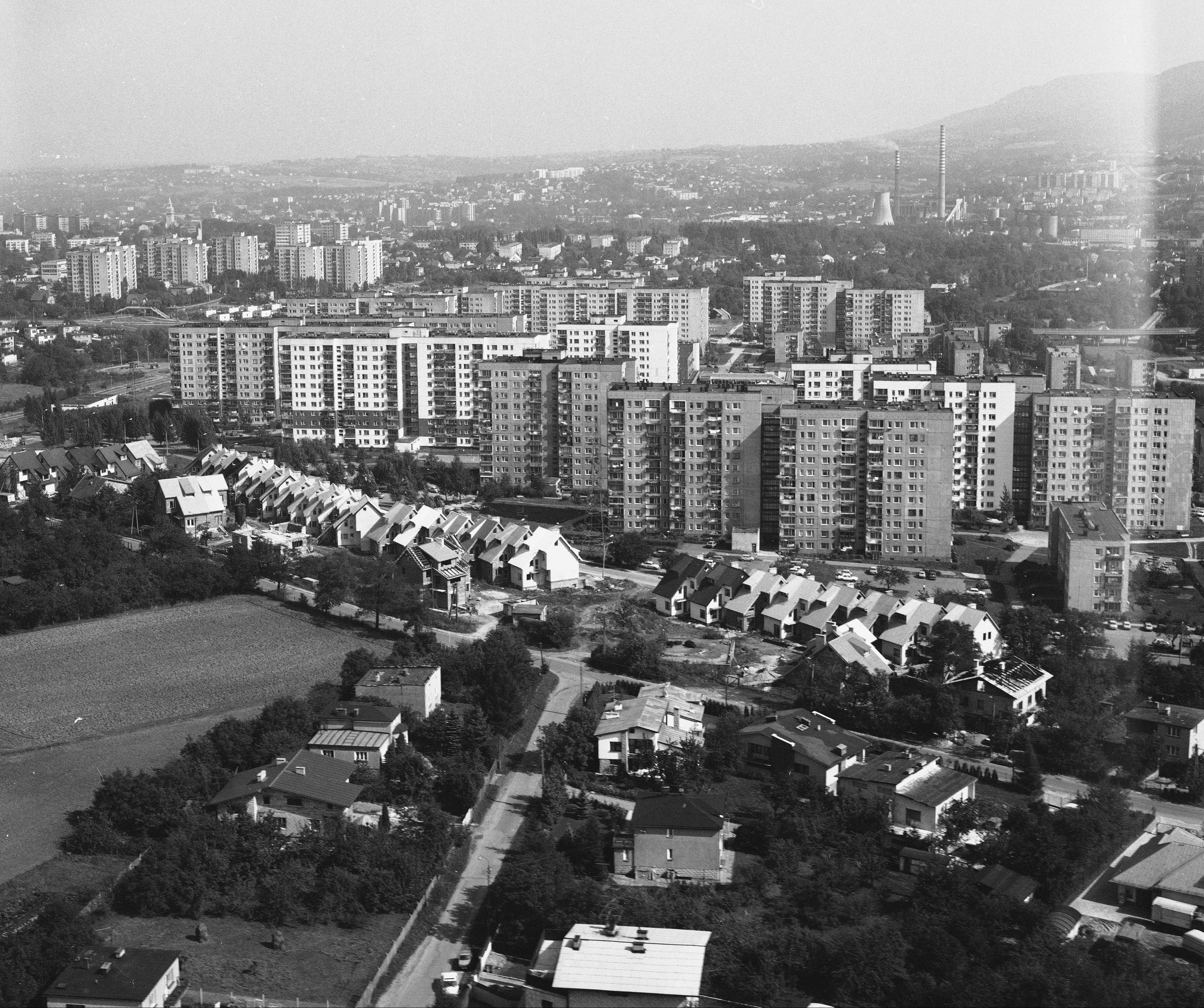
Beskidzkie housing estate in the 1980s

Bielsko-Biała was made famous on a large scale by the Studio Filmów Rysunkowych (Animated Film Studio), founded in 1947. It was one of five animation studios in post-war Poland. Among the children's TV series produced here were Reksio, Bolek i Lolek, Margo the Mouse and Porwanie Baltazara Gąbki.

The general strike launched by the workers of the Bewelana textile factory in January 1981 is considered the most effective strike of the first wave of Solidarity. The strikers forced the mayor of the city, the provincial governor, the commander of Milicja Obywatelska and the municipal and voivodeship secretaries of the Communist party to resign.

From 1975 to 1998, Bielsko-Biała was the capital of the Bielsko-Biała Voivodeship, covering most of Polish Cieszyn Silesia and south-western Lesser Poland (counties of Żywiec, Oświęcim, Wadowice and Sucha Beskidzka). To describe its territory, the name Podbeskidzie was adopted, which is still popular among Bielsko-Biała residents ("Bielsko-Biała - the capital of Podbeskidzie"), but elsewhere it is criticized as an artificial term that is trying to replace traditional historical and geographical lands. The subject of a lively public debate is the long-term effects of the loss of the status of a provincial capital as a result of the administrative reform in 1998, when the area of the former Bielsko-Biała Voivodeship was divided and Bielsko-Biała was incorporated into the Silesian Voivodeship.

The economic transformation after 1989 affected the industrial city with a serious socio-economic crisis. The textile industry, which almost disappeared from Bielsko-Biała, was the most affected. The car factory bought directly by Fiat limited its production only to components. The bad condition of the historic Old Town was the clearest sign of the city's decline in the 1990s, while its gradual revitalization started in 2002 became an important symbol of changes for the better. During the first and second decades of the 21st century, Bielsko-Biała managed to return to the path of economic prosperity. Between 2001 and 2009, on the site of the demolished Lenko and Finex textile factories, a large shopping mall, Galeria Sfera, was built. It is a characteristic post-modernist architectural structure on the banks of the Biała river, however criticised for its negative influence on the traditional commercial zone located around the nearby 11 Listopada Street pedestrian zone. Like other contemporary cities, Bielsko-Biała is strongly affected by suburbanization, which results in a decrease in the number of inhabitants while the population of the neighboring communes is increasing.

== Demographics ==
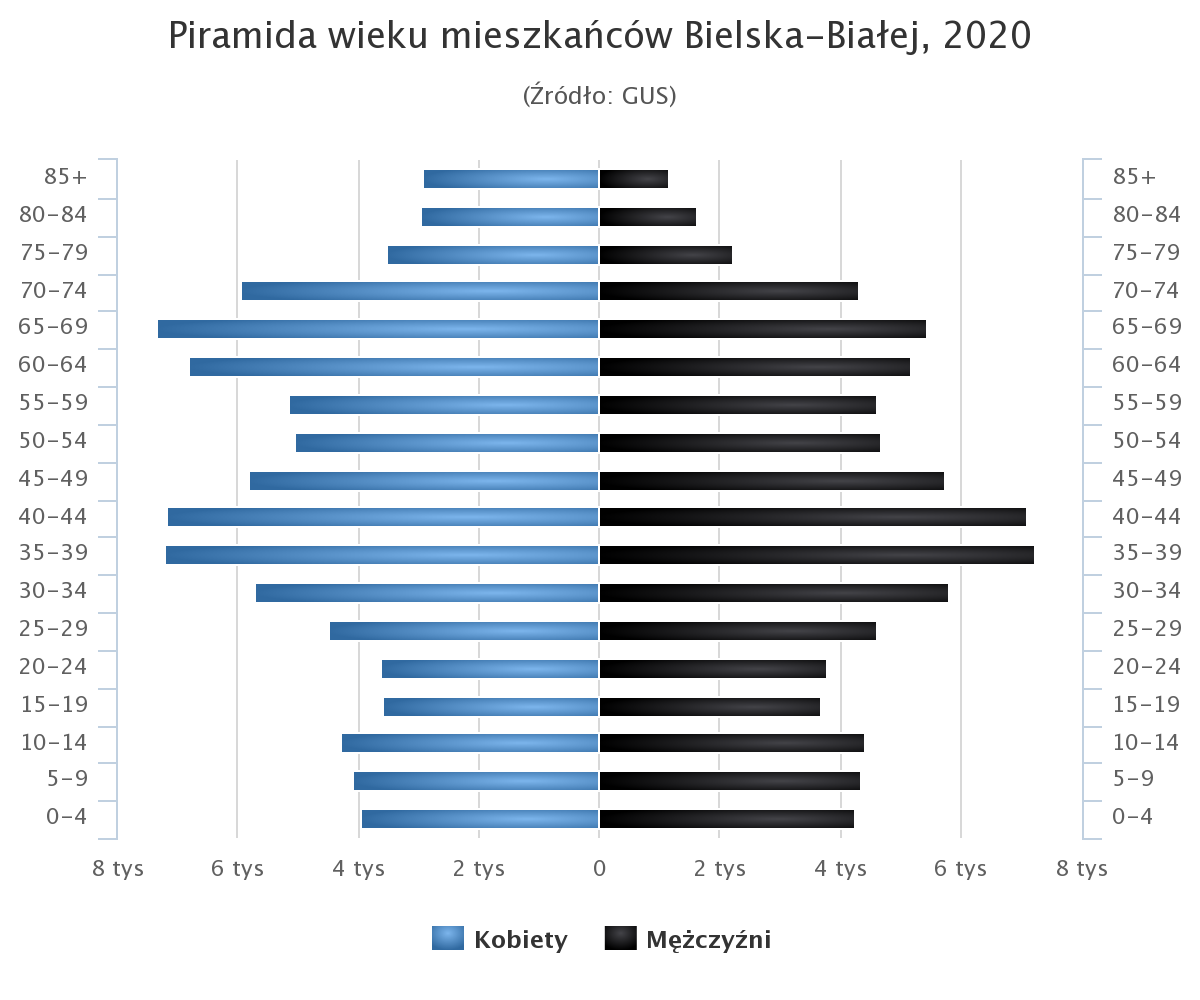
Population pyramid of the inhabitants

On December 31, 2021, the population of Bielsko-Biała was 168,835, including 79,740 (47.2%) men and 89,095 (52.8%) women. This means that there were 112 women for every 100 men. 56.4% of Bielsko-Biała's residents were of working age, 17.5% were of pre-working age, and 26.0% of residents were of post-working age. The city's population accounted for 3.77% of the population of the Silesian Voivodeship. Population density was 1,356 people per square kilometer.

The natural increase, according to data for 2020, was negative, at -610 (-3.58 per thousand residents). 1519 children were born and 2129 deaths were registered. The fertility rate at 1.44 was slightly higher than that of the voivodeship and Poland as a whole. The balance of internal migration was -355 in 2020, while foreign migration was +24. 592 marriages were concluded. 28.6% of residents were single, 55.0% were married, 6.9% were divorced, and 9.4% were widows and widowers.

At the time of the merger of Bielsko and Biała in 1951, the city had a population of about 60,000. Over the years, the population increased with the development of industry and the incorporation of nearby municipalities, particularly fast in the 1970s. Bielsko-Biała reached its highest population (184,421) in 1991. Since then, as in most cities in Poland, there has been a gradual decline in population. Between 2002 and 2021, the population declined by 5.1%. According to forecasts by the Central Statistical Office, Bielsko-Biala is expected to have a population of 161,900 in 2025, 150,400 in 2035 and 133,300 in 2050.

In the 2021 Polish census 99.30% of the population of Bielsko-Biała (167,913 people) declared Polish ethnicity. 2.30% declared another ethnicity (there were a possibility to declare dual ethnicity, so percentages do not add up to 100%), of which: 0.66% (1,108 people) Silesian, 0.21% (321 people) German, 0.20% (335 people) Ukrainian, 0.19% (313 people) English and 0.13% (222 people) Italian. 99.70% of the population (168 582 people) speak Polish at home. Other most commonly used languages (exclusively or together with Polish) are: English (2.30% or 3,893 people), German (0.44% or 743 people), Italian (0.23% or 388 people), Silesian (0.19% or 319 people), Ukrainian (0.16% or 275 people) and Russian (0.13% or 227 people). Detailed statistics on the religious structure are not available.

Historical population

Year	Pop.	±%
1880	20,312	—
1890	22,195	+9.3%
1900	24,854	+12.0%
1910	27,236	+9.6%
1921	36,857	+35.3%

Year	Pop.	±%
1931	47,465	+28.8%
1939	54,723	+15.3%
1946	45,289	−17.2%
1960	75,527	+66.8%
1970	105,700	+39.9%

Year	Pop.	±%
1980	163,741	+54.9%
1990	181,278	+10.7%
2000	178,611	−1.5%
2010	175,008	−2.0%
2020	169,756	−3.0%

For the period before 1951, aggregated data for Bielsko and Biała. Source: Polska w liczbach web site for data since 1995, Monografia Bielska-Białej for data before 1945, Roczniki statystyczne for data 1945–1990

=== Ethnic and linguistic structure ===
In the National Census of Population and Housing 2021, 99.30% of Bielsko-Biala residents (167,913 people) declared Polish nationality. 2.30% declared a different nationality (as the only one or together with Polish), including: 0.66% (1108 people) Silesian, 0.21% (321 people) German, 0.20% (335 people) Ukrainian, 0.19% (313 people) English and 0.13% (222 people) Italian.

In the light of the same census, 99.70% of Bielszczans (168,582 people) speak Polish at home. The other most commonly used languages (exclusively or jointly with Polish) are: English (2.30%, 3893 people), German (0.44%, 743 people), Italian (0.23%, 388 people), Silesian (0.19%, etc%, 319 people), Ukrainian (0.16%, 275 people) and Russian (0.13%, 227 people).

== Sights ==
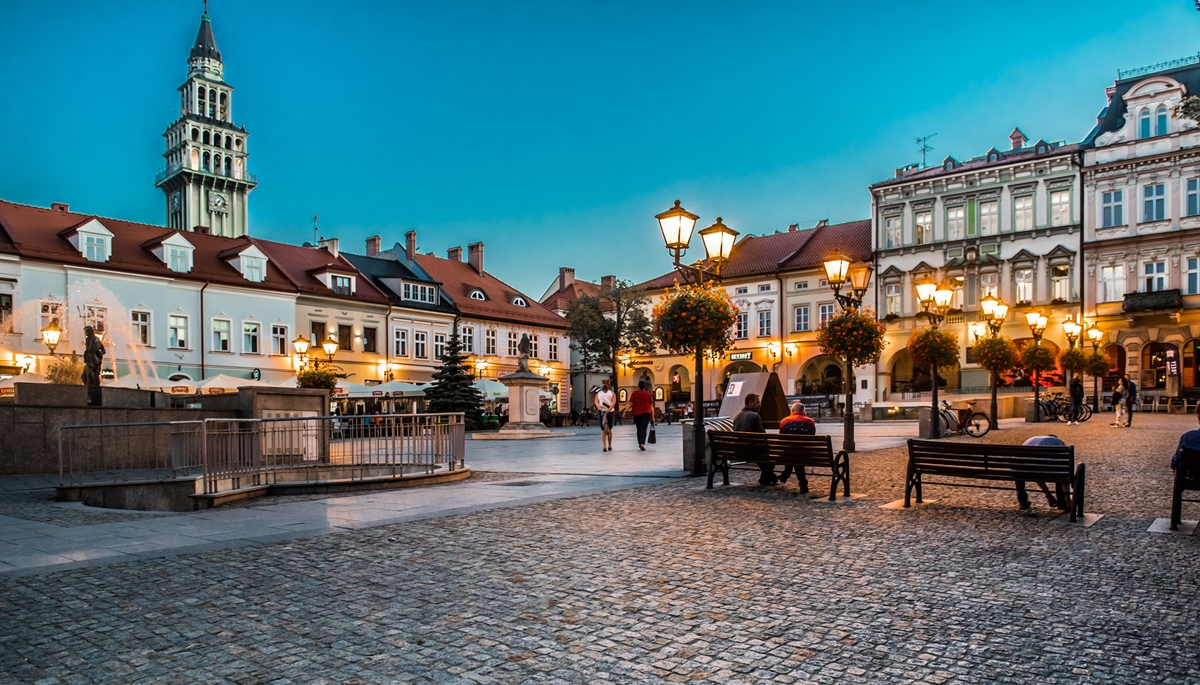
Bielsko Market Square

The Old Town of Bielsko is located on the Town Hill. It is characterized by an oval urban layout with a regular street grid running out from the corners of the rectangular Market Square (Rynek), typical of towns founded in the 13th century under the Magdeburg Law. The external appearance of the buildings dates mainly from the first half of the 19th century, when the town was restored after the fires of 1808 and 1836. Among the most picturesque corners are Podcienie Street, where 18th-century arcades are still preserved, and Schodowa Street, which is a step street. Along Orkana, Waryńskiego and Zamkowa Street, fragments of the outer belt of town walls completed in the 16th century have been preserved.

Within the Old Town are two iconic historic buildings:

- Bielsko Castle, also known as the Castle of the Sułkowski Princes (Zamek książąt Sułkowskich), after the family that inhabited it from 1752 to 1945. The history of the castle dates back to the medieval frontier stronghold of the Dukes of Teschen, but its current appearance is the result of an eclectic reconstruction carried out in 1855–1864. It now houses the Historical Museum of Bielsko-Biala.
- Cathedral of St. Nicholas, a Roman Catholic parish church located on the site since the Middle Ages, which was rebuilt to its present form in 1909–1912 according to a design by Leopold Bauer. In 1992, the church became the cathedral of the newly created diocese of Bielsko and Żywiec.

To the north of the Old Town lies the Bielsko Zion (Bielski Syjon), a Lutheran quarter founded after Emperor Joseph II issued the 1782 Edict of Tolerance. There are important monuments associated with the Lutheran community here: the Church of the Saviour (1782-1790, then extended several times in the 19th century, including between 1881 and 1882 by Heinrich Ferstel), the only Luther Monument in present-day Poland, unveiled in 1900, a complex of school buildings from the 19th century, and the Old Lutheran Cemetery.

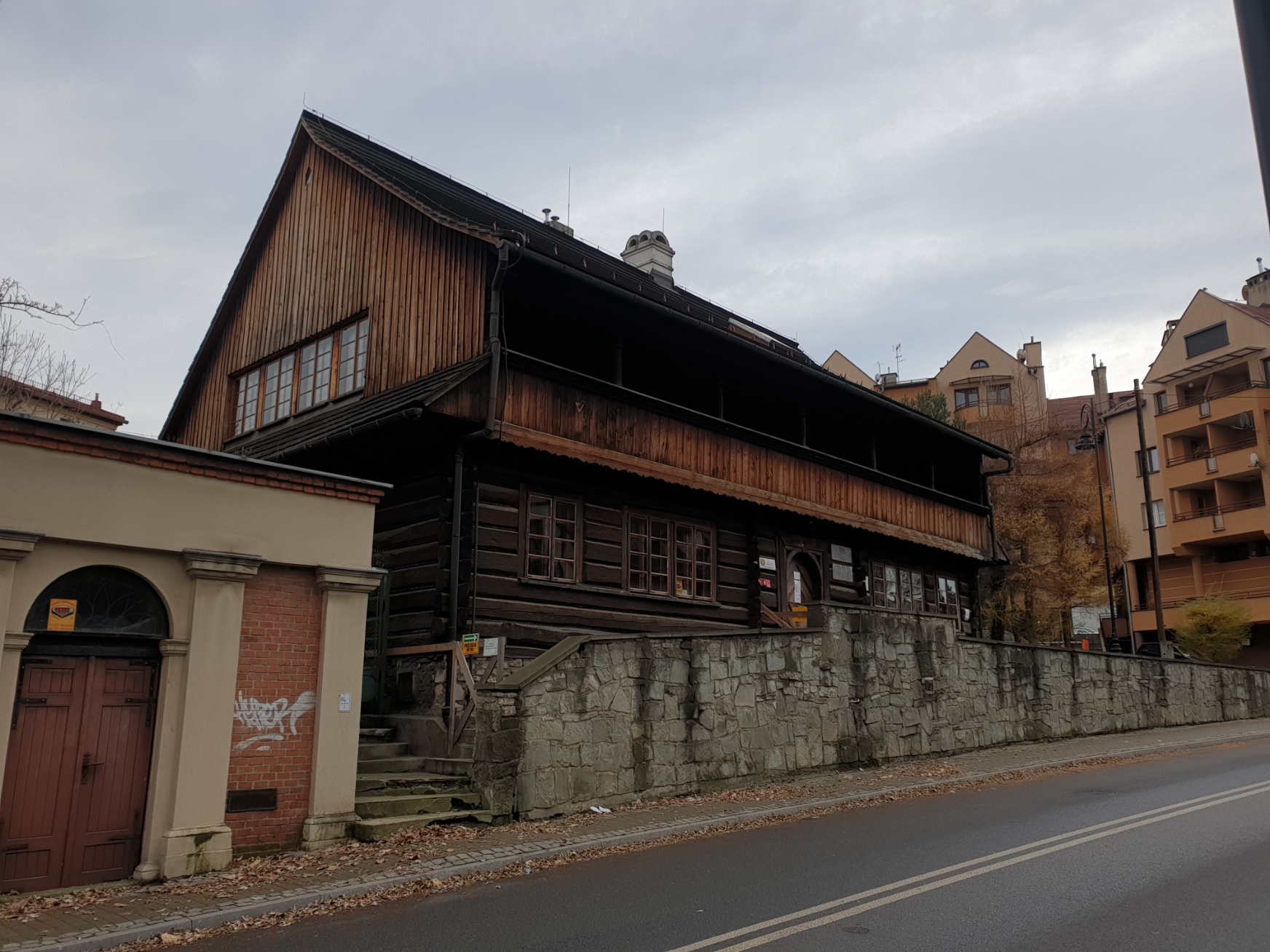
The Weaver's House

To the west of the Old Town, along Cieszyńska and Sobieskiego Street, extends the Upper Suburb (Górne Przedmieście). It is a former clothmakers' quarter with characteristic small-town buildings. Particularly notable among them is the wooden Weaver's House with a museum dedicated to the life and work of the clothiers in the pre-industrial era. Somewhat tucked away in Zdrojowa Street stands one of the oldest still preserved villas of Bielsko's rich factory owners - the Neo-Renaissance Villa Bartelmuss from 1872.

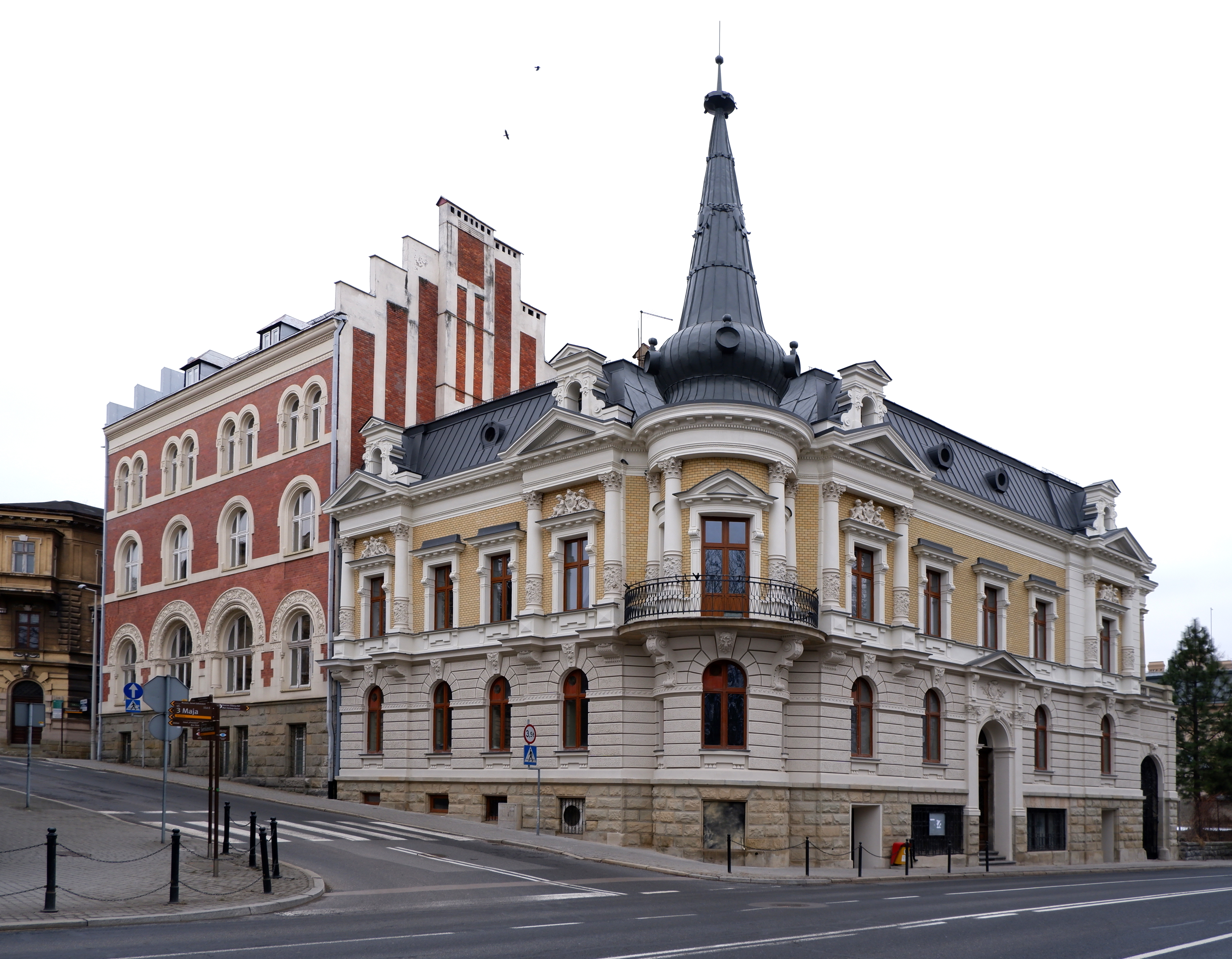
The Michl's House, an example of a neo-Baroque townhouse at 3 Maja Street, built in 1895, and the former seat of the Jewish community from 1904 (on the left)

The Lower Suburb (Dolne Przedmieście), which extends to the north, is dominated by the turn-of-the-20th-century architecture. This is where the greatest concentration of Revivalist and Art Nouveau buildings to which Bielsko-Biała owes the term "Little Vienna" is to be found: the own house of the architect Carl Korn (1883), Villa Sixt (1883), Jędrzej Śniadecki School of Electrical, Electronic and Mechanical Engineering (originally "the High Schools Building", 1883), the former Municipal Savings Bank (Komunalna Kasa Oszczędności, 1889, with an extension of 1901 by Max Fabiani and another extension of 1908–1910), Main Train Station (1890), Theatre (1890), Hotel President (1893), Main Post Office (1898), the former district office (1903, now one of the seats of the Regional Court), Villa Schneider (1904), Bielsko Industrial School (Bielska Szkoła Przemysłowa, 1912). Architecturally valuable are the complexes of the bourgeois townhouses along 3 Maja, 11 Listopada, Barlickiego or Mickiewicza Street. Bolesława Chrobrego Square, commonly known as Pigal, stretching between the Bielsko Castle and the former Municipal Savings Bank, is the de facto central square of the city today. A much lesser role is now played by Franciszka Smolki Square which is the historic Lower Market.

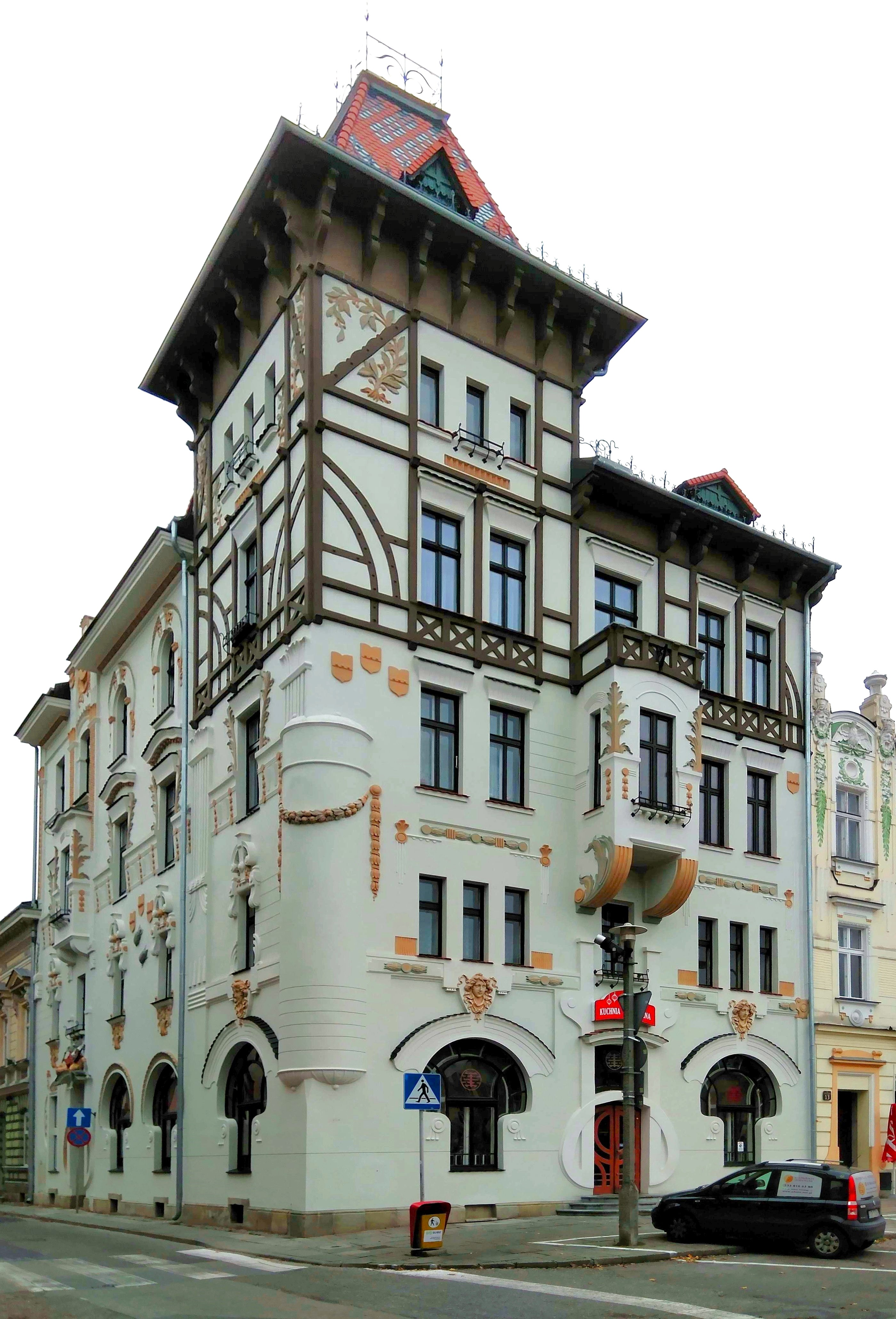
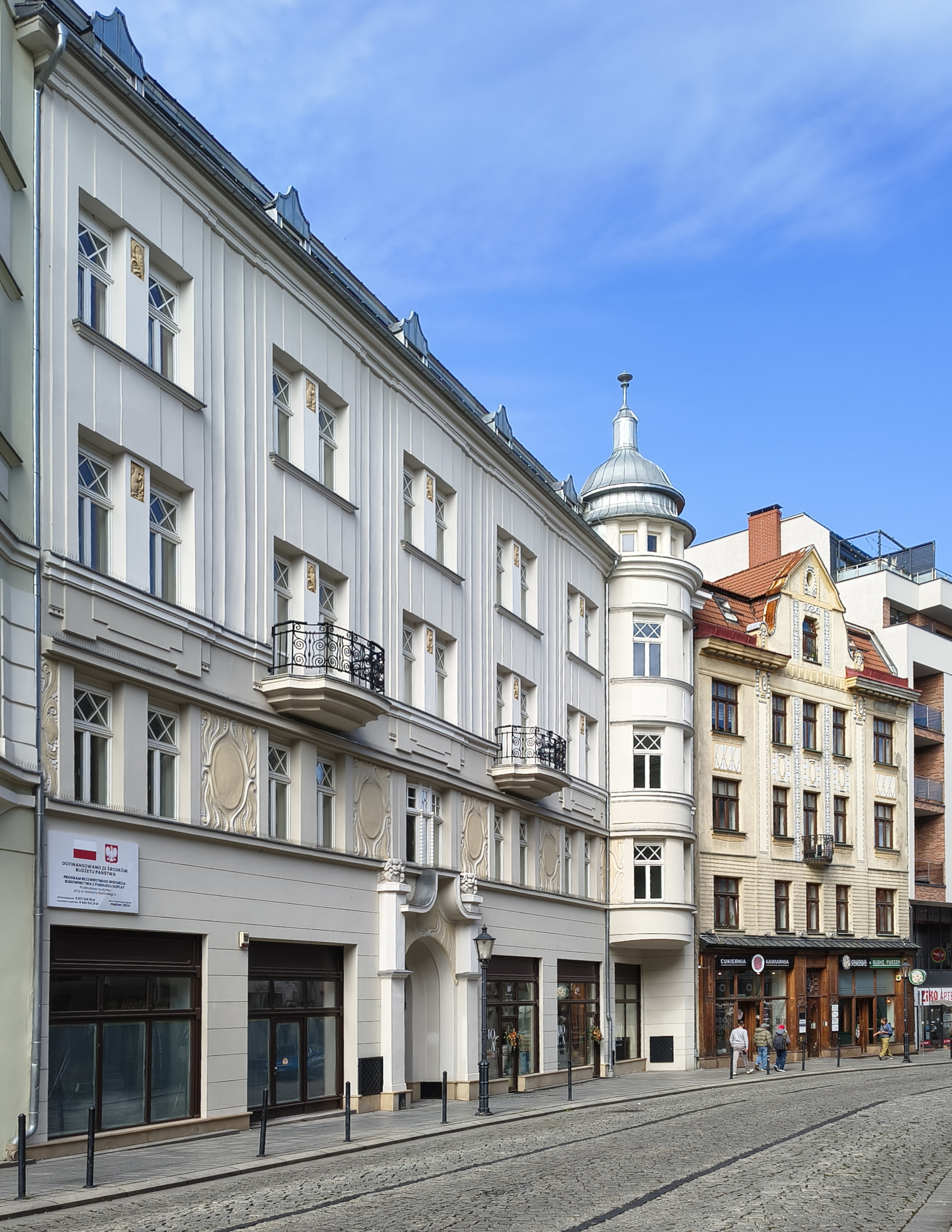
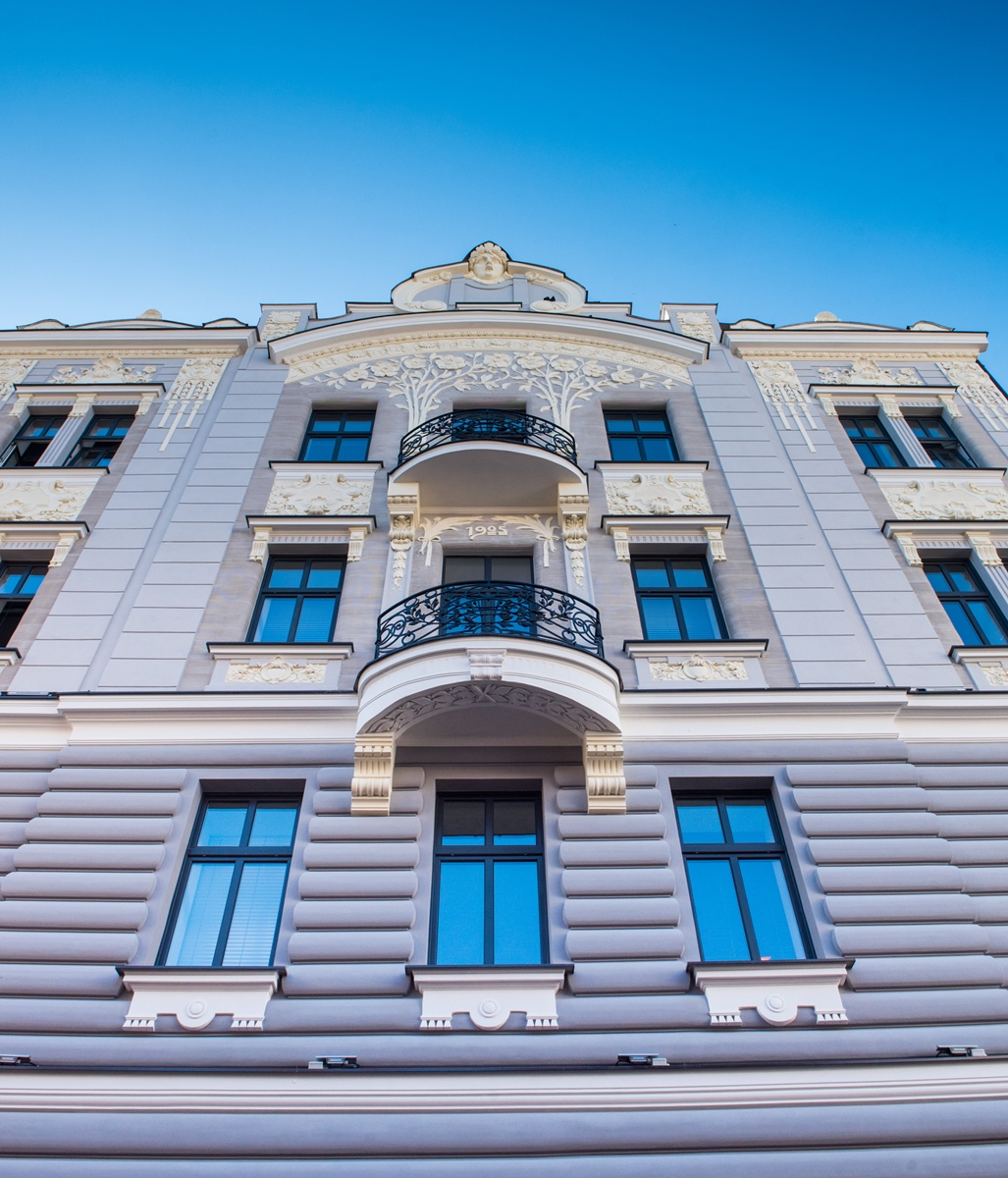
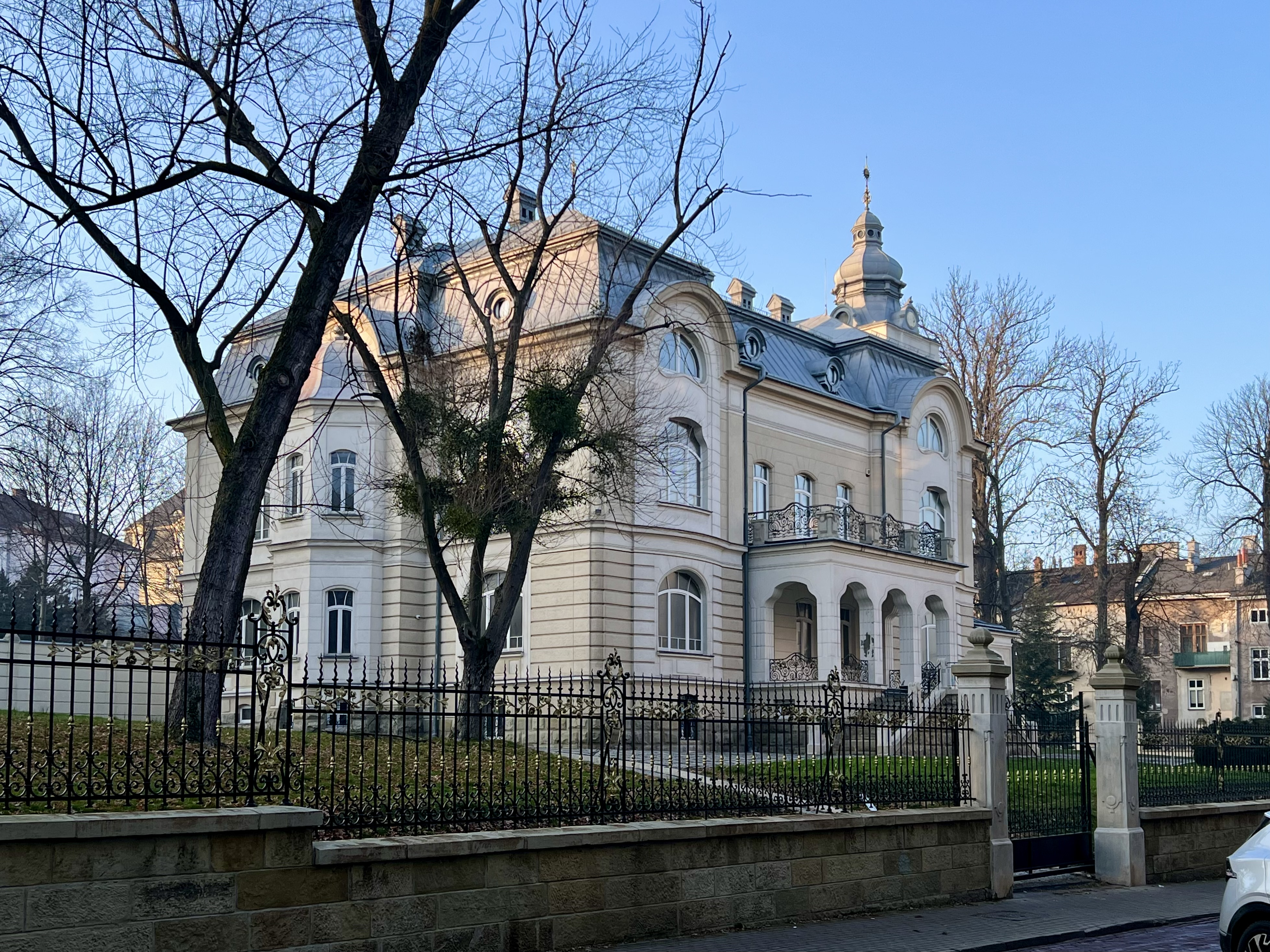
Art Nouveau architecture in Bielsko-Biała, clockwise from upper left: Frog House, Barlickiego streetview, a tenement house at Mickiewicza Street and the Villa Schneider

The axis of the historic centre of Biała is the right bank section of 11 Listopada Street, laid out in the 1780s. Numerous townhouses representing the so-called Josephine style (named after Emperor Joseph II) with Baroque and Neoclassical features have been preserved along it. The street, which today serves as the main promenade, passes through two of Biała's historic markets: Wojska Polskiego Square (delineated in 1723) and Wolności Square (delineated in the 1780s). The two main churches in Biała also date from the late 18th century: the Lutheran Church of Martin Luther (1782–1788) and the Roman Catholic Church of the Divine Providence (1769, expanded in the 19th century). The Lutheran church is located next to Wojska Polskiego Square, while the Catholic church is on what used to be outskirts of the town, near the border with Lipnik.

Biała's Town Hall, built between 1895 and 1897 in Neo-Renaissance style according to a design by Emanuel Rost Junior, today serves as the City Hall for the combined city. Other important architectural monuments from the turn of the 20th century in Biała are: the former Polish elementary school at Legionów Street (1898), Jakubecki House at 51 Stojałowskiego Street (1903, by Leopold Bauer), Frog House (Kamienica Pod Żabami, 1903, a prominent example of Art Nouveau), Pedagogical Library (1903, originally the villa of the architect Emanuel Rost Junior), the former hotel Under the Eagle (Hotel Pod Orłem, 1904) and the Economic High School (Zespół Szkół Ekonomicznych, 1910, originally the Polish Teachers' Seminary).

The architecture of the interwar period also plays an important role in the cityscape. The largest concentration of early Modernist housing is in the area of Bohaterów Warszawy, Wilsona and Grota-Roweckiego Street, which has been built up since 1934 (before that, the castle gardens stretched here). The public buildings of the 1920s and 1930s include: Nicolaus Copernicus High School (Liceum Kopernika, 1925–1927), a complex of buildings at the intersection of Sixta and Krasińskiego Street (1922–1930), the fire station on Grunwaldzka Street (1928), and the new headquarters of the Municipal Savings Bank on the other side of Bolesława Chrobrego Square (1938).

Old industrial buildings intersect with urban development in many places, especially in the Lower Suburb near the Biała River, in the Żywiec Suburb (Żywieckie Przedmieście), which is the southern part of Bielsko, and in Biała. The Old Factory Museum (Stara Fabryka) in the former Büttner's textile factory ("Bewelana" during the socialist period), the former Jacob Gross's vodka and liqueur factory (later "Polmos") converted into lofts at Stojałowskiego Street, the former Gustav Josephy's machine factory complex ("Befama") at Powstańców Śląskich Street, or the whole area around Podwale and Grażyńskiego Street are some notable examples. In the area of Michałowicza Street a workers' housing estate with familoks was built between 1892 and 1911.

Significant examples of post-war architecture in the central districts include: Grunwaldzkie housing estate (1951–1957), the bus station (1972), Library of Beskids (1973), Church of the Sacred Heart of Jesus (1984), "Klimczok" Cooperative Department Store (1988) and Art Exhibition Bureau (1989, now Galeria Bielska BWA). Post-modern and contemporary architecture is represented by the Galeria Sfera shopping mall (2000–2001, with an extension from 2007–2011) and by the blob concert hall Cavatina Hall (2019–2021).

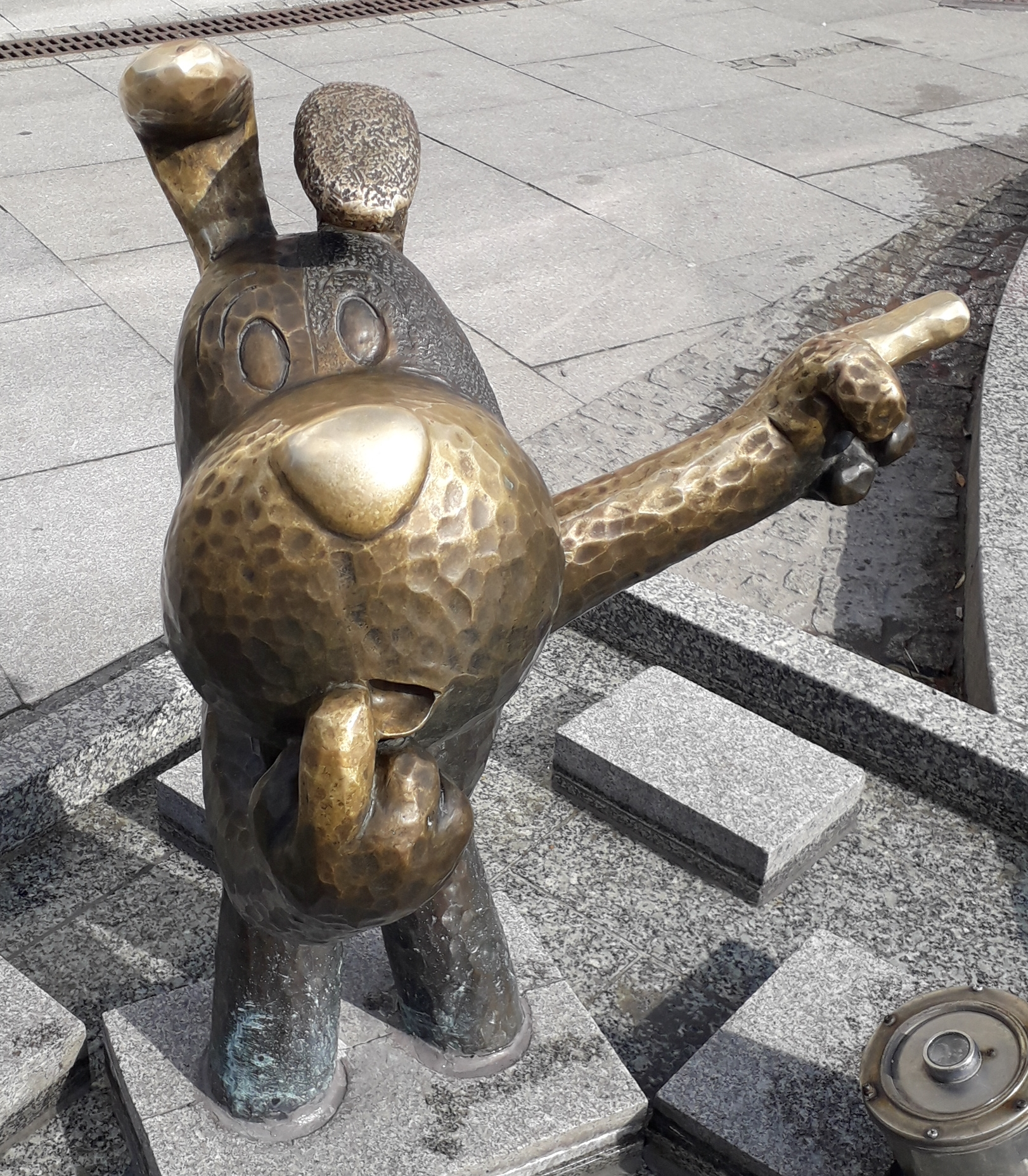
Reksio monument

Murals have been created in many places in the inner city in recent years. The street art tourist trail counted 25 sites in 2022. As part of the "Fairytale Bielsko-Biala" trail, small monuments to characters from animated films produced by Studio Filmów Rysunkowych are being erected. By 2023, they have been created: Reksio, Bolek and Lolek, Baltazar Gąbka with the Wawel Dragon, Pampalini the Animal Hunter, and Don Pedro de Pommidore.

Cygański Las (literally "Gypsy Forest") is a forest park located between the districts of Mikuszowice Śląskie and Olszówka Dolna, at the foot of the Kozia Góra and Równia mountains. At the end of the 19th century, it was arranged as a space for walking and relaxation for the inhabitants in imitation of the Vienna Woods and connected to the centre by a tram line (existing until 1971). Adjacent to Cygański Las there is a meadow area known as Błonia used as a sports and recreation area. An important attraction of Olszówka Dolna and Mikuszowice Śląskie is a number of bourgeois summer villas from the turn of the 20th century.

Another favourite destination for suburban excursions is the Szyndzielnia mountain, 1,001 metres (3,284 ft), which is accessible by a gondola lift. The tourist hostel on Szyndzielnia was opened in 1897. Attractions on the Dębowiec mountain, 686 metres (2,251 ft), are a ski complex and a toboggan run. Both Dębowiec and Szyndzielnia offer extensive views of the city.

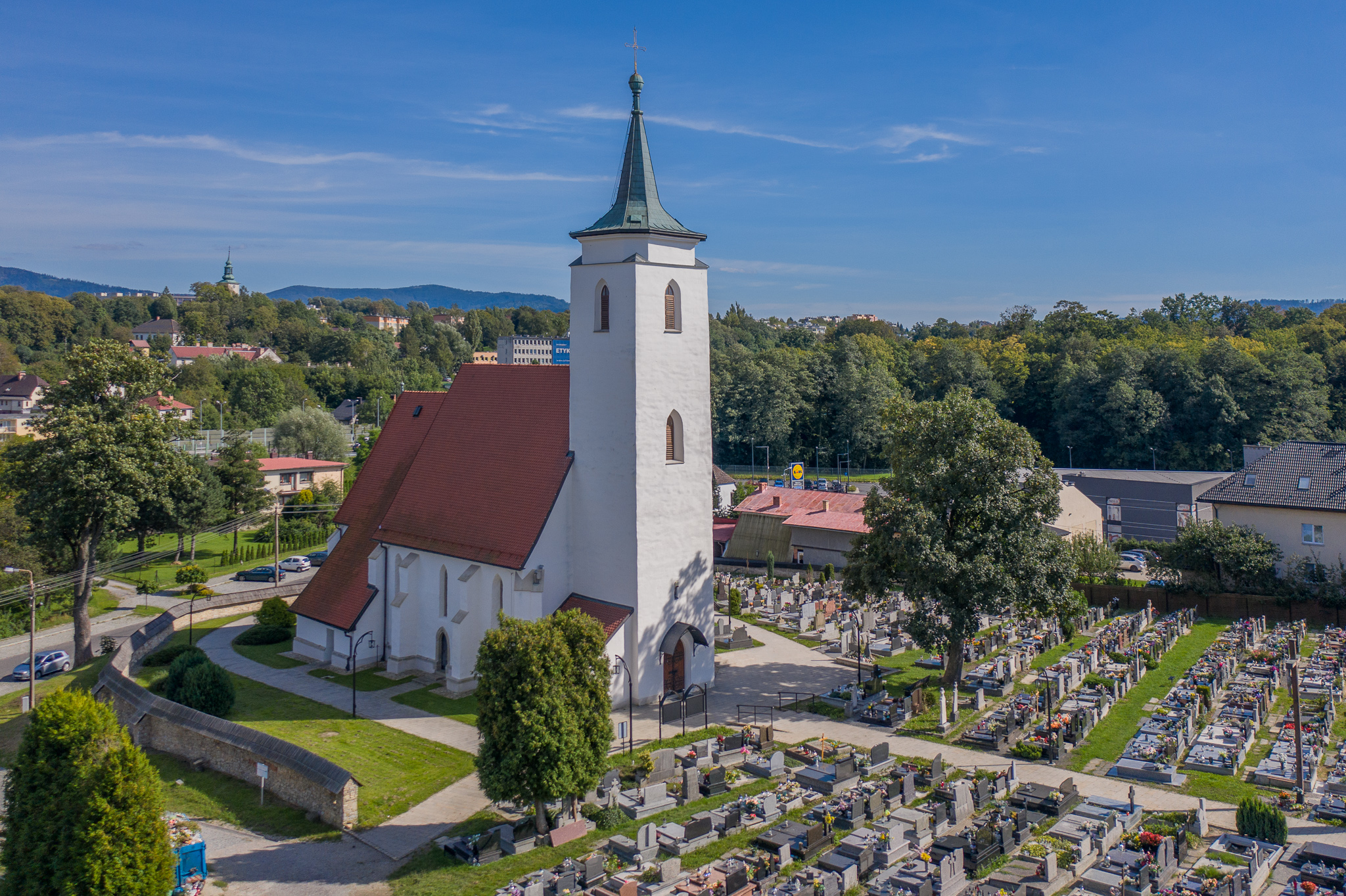
Church of St. Stanislaus in Stare Bielsko

In Stare Bielsko there is the Roman Catholic Church of St. Stanislaus, built around 1380, with well-preserved fragments of Gothic polychromies and a valuable altar triptych from the 16th century. The second temple of Stare Bielsko is the Lutheran Church of Saint John the Baptist in Neoclassical style from 1818. Adjacent to it there is a circular undeveloped area that is a remnant of a medieval hillfort (Grodzisko), a settlement that existed at this location before the city was founded.

Another important religious monument are Roman Catholic churches of St. Barbara in Mikuszowice Krakowskie (wooden, built in 1690) and of the Visitation of the Blessed Virgin Mary in Hałcnów (from the 18th century, it serves as a local pilgrimage site). There is also a well-preserved Jewish cemetery in Aleksandrowice with a Moorish-style pre-burial house from 1885.

== Culture ==
=== Cultural centres ===
The most important public institutions organising cultural life in the city are: Maria Koterbska Bielsko-Biała Cultural Centre (Bielskie Centrum Kultury im. Marii Koterbskiej, BCK), Regional Cultural Centre (Regionalny Ośrodek Kultury, ROK), Municipal House of Culture (Miejski Dom Kultury, MDK) made up of thirteen facilities including district culture centers including eight district cultural centres, Military Cultural Centre "Soldier's House" (Wojskowy Ośrodek Kultury "Dom Żołnierza") and Cooperative Cultural Centre BEST (Spółdzielczy Dom Kultury BEST).

=== Theatres and cinemas ===
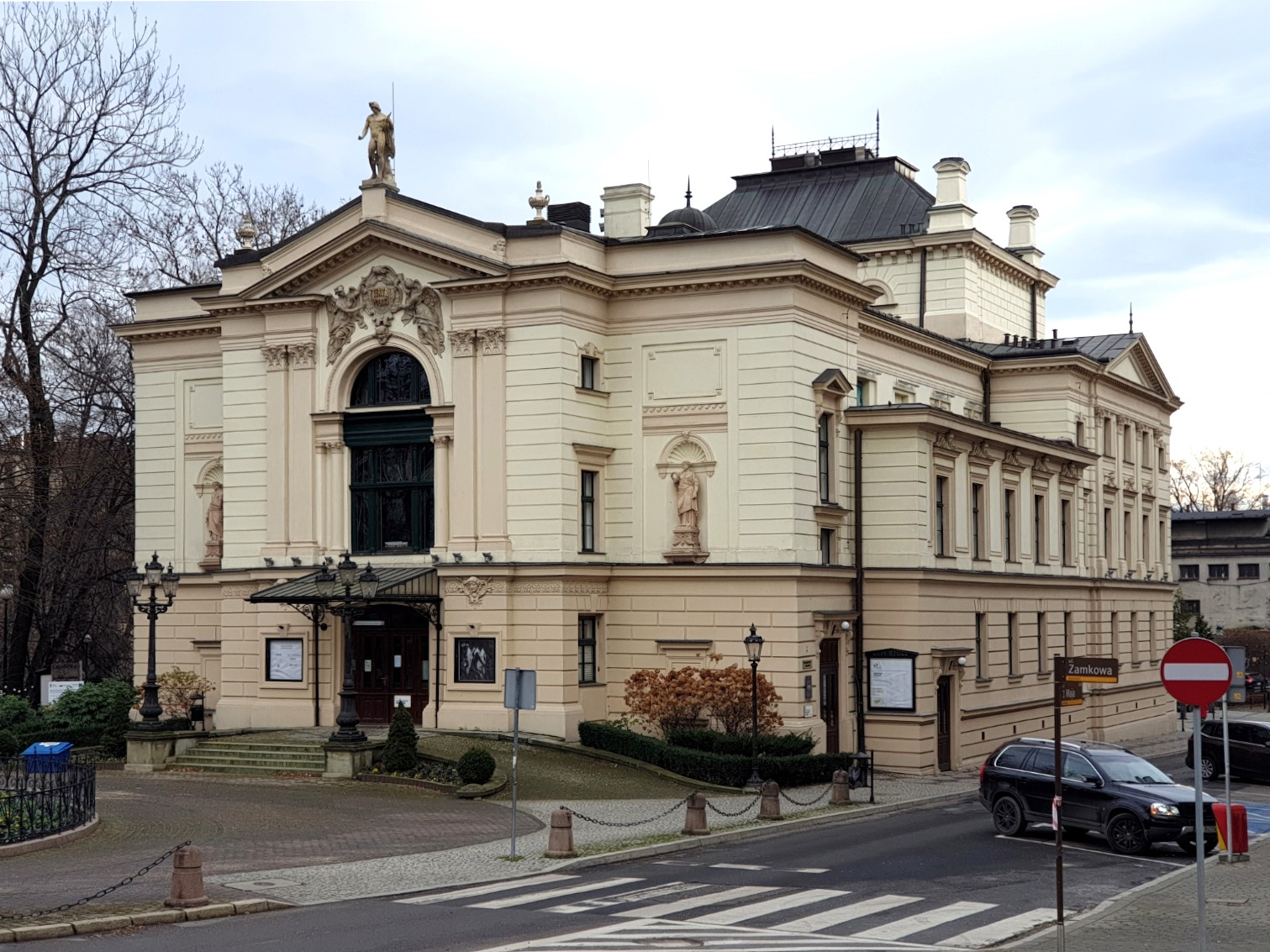
Polish Theatre

Polish Theatre (Teatr Polski) is a drama theater that was established after World War II as a successor to the German Stadttheater Bielitz, founded in 1890, and took over its historic building at 1 Maja Street. Banialuka Puppet Theatre (Teatr Lalek Banialuka) was founded in 1947 on the initiative of Jerzy Zitzman and Zenobiusz Zwolski. It is one of the leading institutions of its kind in Poland. In addition, numerous performances are staged at BCK cultural centre, and non-professional theater activities are conducted by the Bielsko-Biała Artistic Association Teatr Grodzki, founded in 1999.

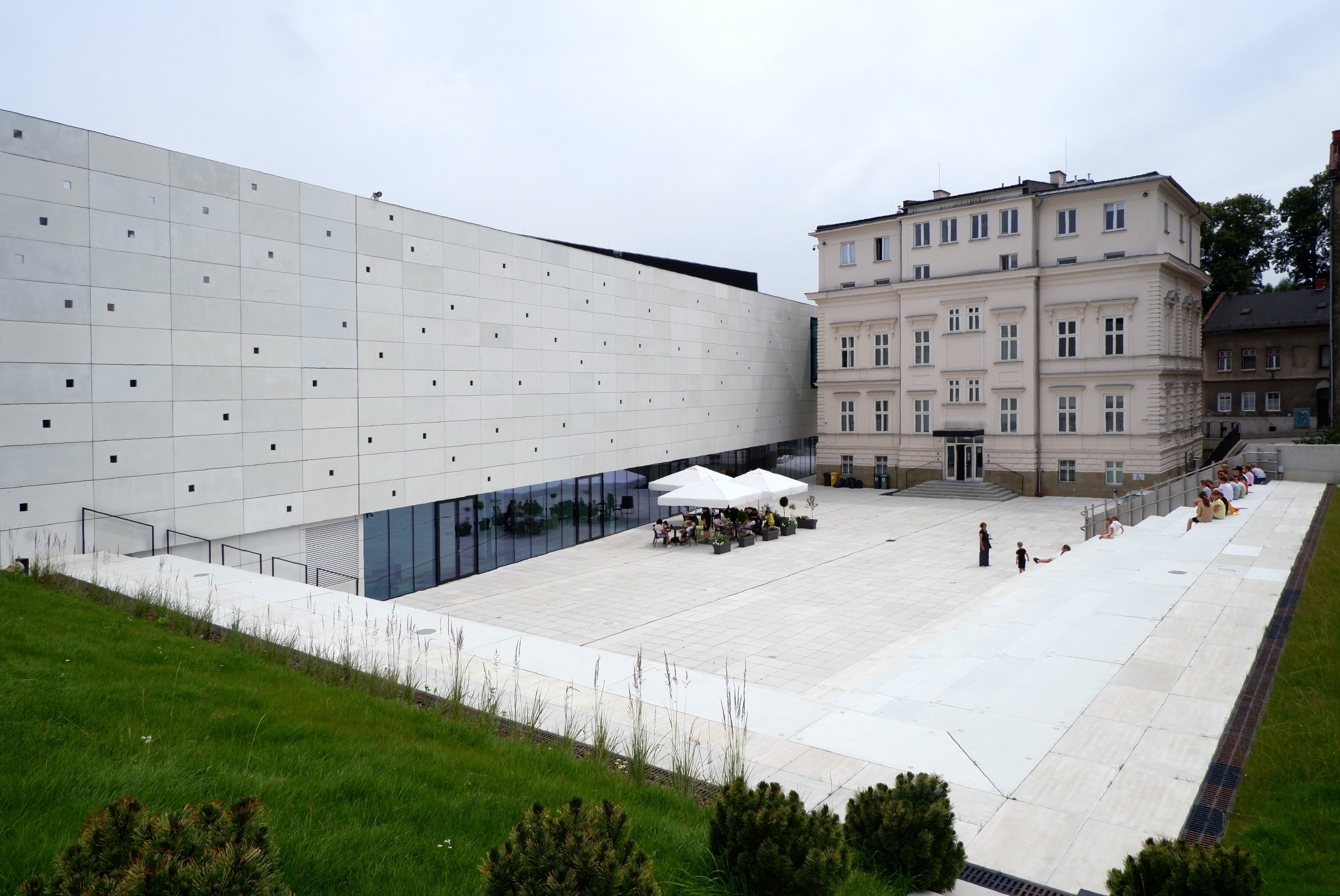
Headquarters of the animation studio and the Interactive Centre of Fairy Tales and Animation in 2024

Bielsko-Biała is known as the city where Studio Filmów Rysunkowych (SFR)—one of five animation studios established in post-war Poland—is headquartered. It has existed since 1947, and has produced such cartoons as Reksio, Bolek and Lolek, Margo the Mouse and a number of others. Among the most recent works is the series Kuba i Śruba, filmed between 2011 and 2016. In 2024, the OKO Interactive Fairy Tale and Animation Centre (Interaktywne Centrum Bajki i Animacji OKO) was opened on the studio premises at 22-24 Cieszyńska Street, which serves as a museum and thematic entertainment and educational centre based on the SFR's heritage. The centre includes the Kreska cinema, the only arthouse cinema in the city. Apart from it, Bielsko-Biala has two multiplexes: Helios in the Galeria Sfera shopping mall and Cinema City in the Gemini Park shopping mall.

=== Art galleries ===
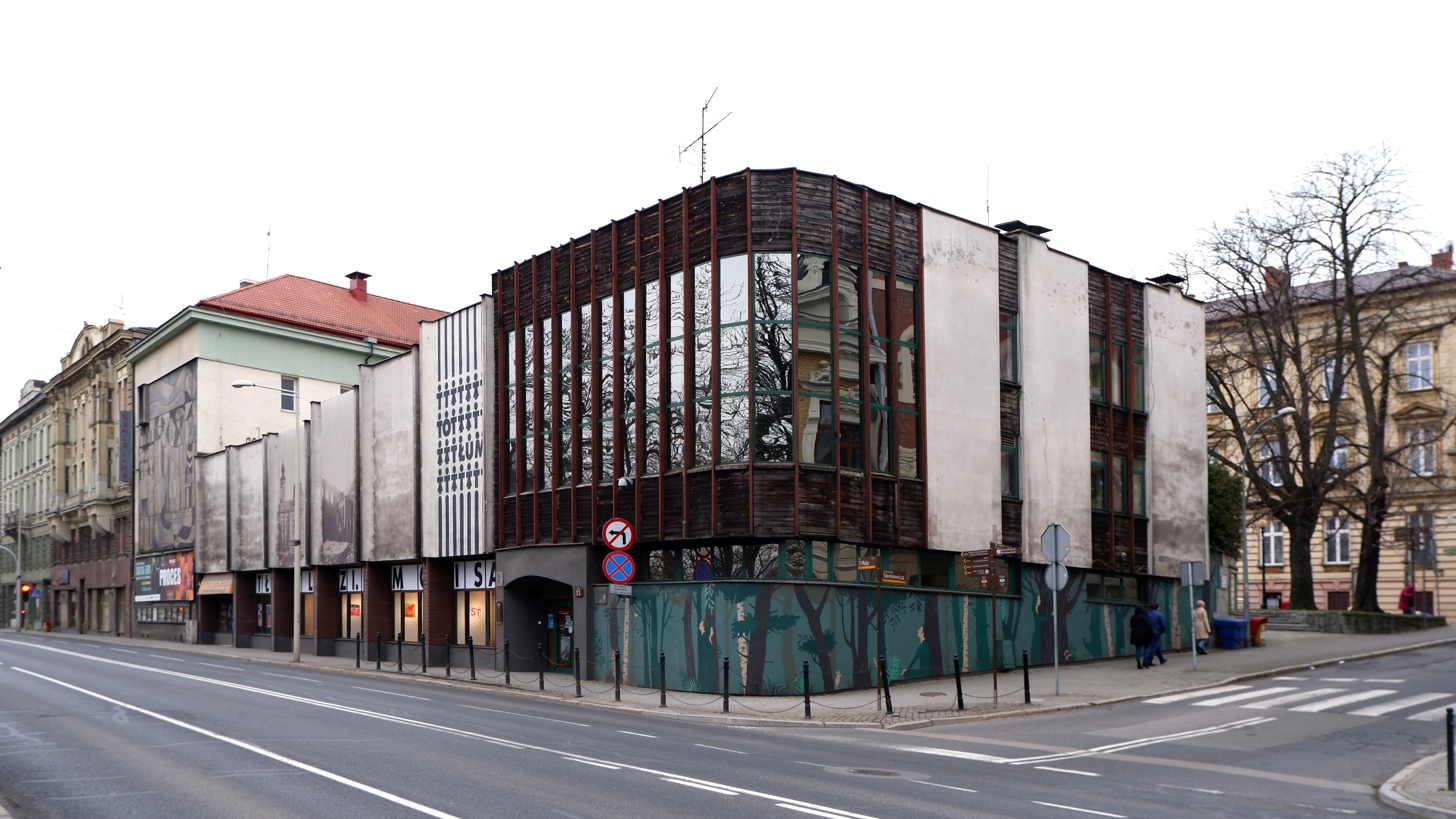
Main site of Galeria Bielska BWA

The largest art gallery is Galeria Bielska BWA. It is a municipally owned institution founded in 1994 based on the transformation of the former Art Exhibition Bureau (Biuro Wystaw Artystycznych). It is located in the former Artists' Pavilion at 3 Maja Street, and since 2020 it has also had a second location in the historic Villa Sixt. There is a club café Aquarium at the main BWA site which hosts numerous cultural and social events.

Among private establishments, the Wzgórze Gallery, founded in 1987 by Franciszek Kukioła, the Contemporary Art Gallery (Galeria Sztuki Współczesnej), the Ars Nova sculpture and ceramics studio, which has existed since 1991, and the Photography Gallery B&B, established in 1992 by Inez and Andrzej Baturo, have the longest tradition.

=== Museums ===
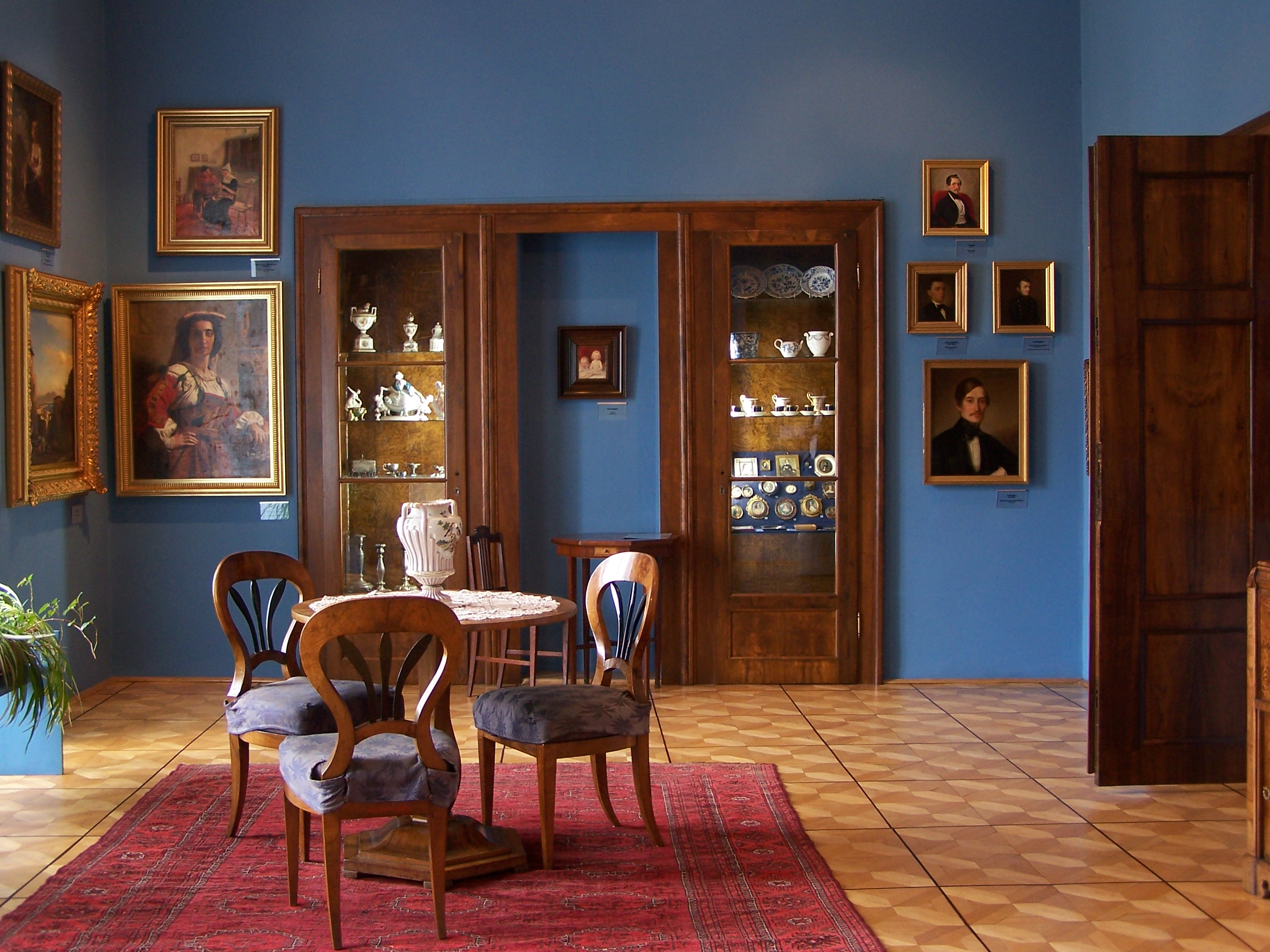
Interiors of the Historical Museum of Bielsko-Biała

The Historical Museum of Bielsko-Biała (Muzeum Historyczne w Bielsku-Białej) has its seat in the Bielsko Castle, where the permanent exhibition is divided into nine parts: "History of Bielsko-Biała and its surroundings" (historical and archaeological exhibition), "Biedermeier" or bourgeois salon of the second half of the 19th century, "Music salon", "Hall of ancient art", "Shooting gallery" (collection of weapons), "Gallery of European and Polish painting of the 19th and 20th century", "Gallery of portrait painting of the 19th and first half of the 20th century", "Gallery of graphics of the turn of the 19th and 20th century", "Gallery of contemporary art of the Bielsko-Biała region" (works of the second half of the 20th century with special emphasis on artists from the Beskid Group around Ignacy Bieniek). In addition, the museum has three branches:

- The Old Factory (Stara Fabryka): an exhibition dedicated to the history of Bielsko-Biała's industry with a collection of historical machines placed in the space of a former textile factory at Żwirki i Wigury Square
- The Weaver's House (Dom Tkacza): a reconstruction of the interior of a pre-industrial weaver's house and workshop in an 18th-century house at Sobieskiego Street in Górne Przedmieście district
- Fałatówka: a museum dedicated to the life and work of Julian Fałat in a villa in Bystra Śląska, where the artist lived from 1910 to 1929

There are several private museums in the city: the Automotive Museum (Muzeum Motoryzacji) with a small collection of old cars and other automotive exhibits made available by the Beskidy Car Club (Automobilklub Beskidzki), the Fiat 126p Museum with a collection of Fiat 126p cars produced since the 1970s at the FSM factory in Bielsko-Biała run by Antoni Przychodzień, the Museum of Armored Weapons and Militaria (Muzeum Broni Pancernej i Militariów) with a collection of military vehicles collected since the 1980s by Rafał Bier, the Museum of Minerals "Treasures of the Earth" (Muzeum Minerałów "Skarby Ziemi") run by Piotr Kotula, and the Museum of the 1990s (Muzeum 90) run by Sebastian Balcerzak.

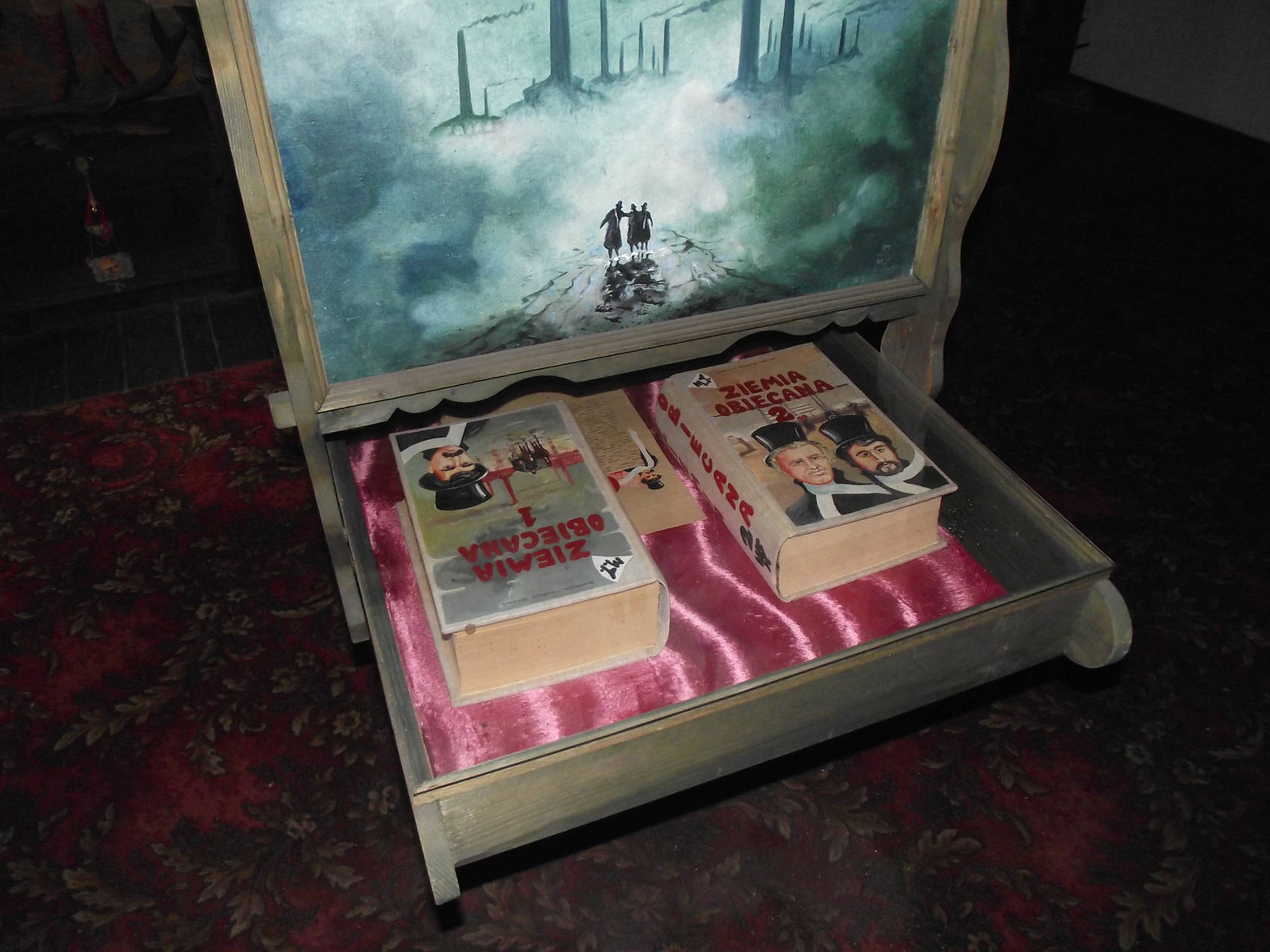
Handwritten copies of the Promised Land at the Władysław Reymont Museum of Literature

At the end of 2023, the activities of the Władysław Reymont Museum of Literature (Muzeum Literatury im. Władysława Reymonta), which was run in an old town house at 1 Pankiewicza St. by Tadeusz Modrzejewski, who had devoted himself to transcribing the works of Władysław Reymont by hand since the 1980s, were suspended. The collection secured by Książnica Beskidzka is to be made available again after the renovation of the building.

=== Music ===
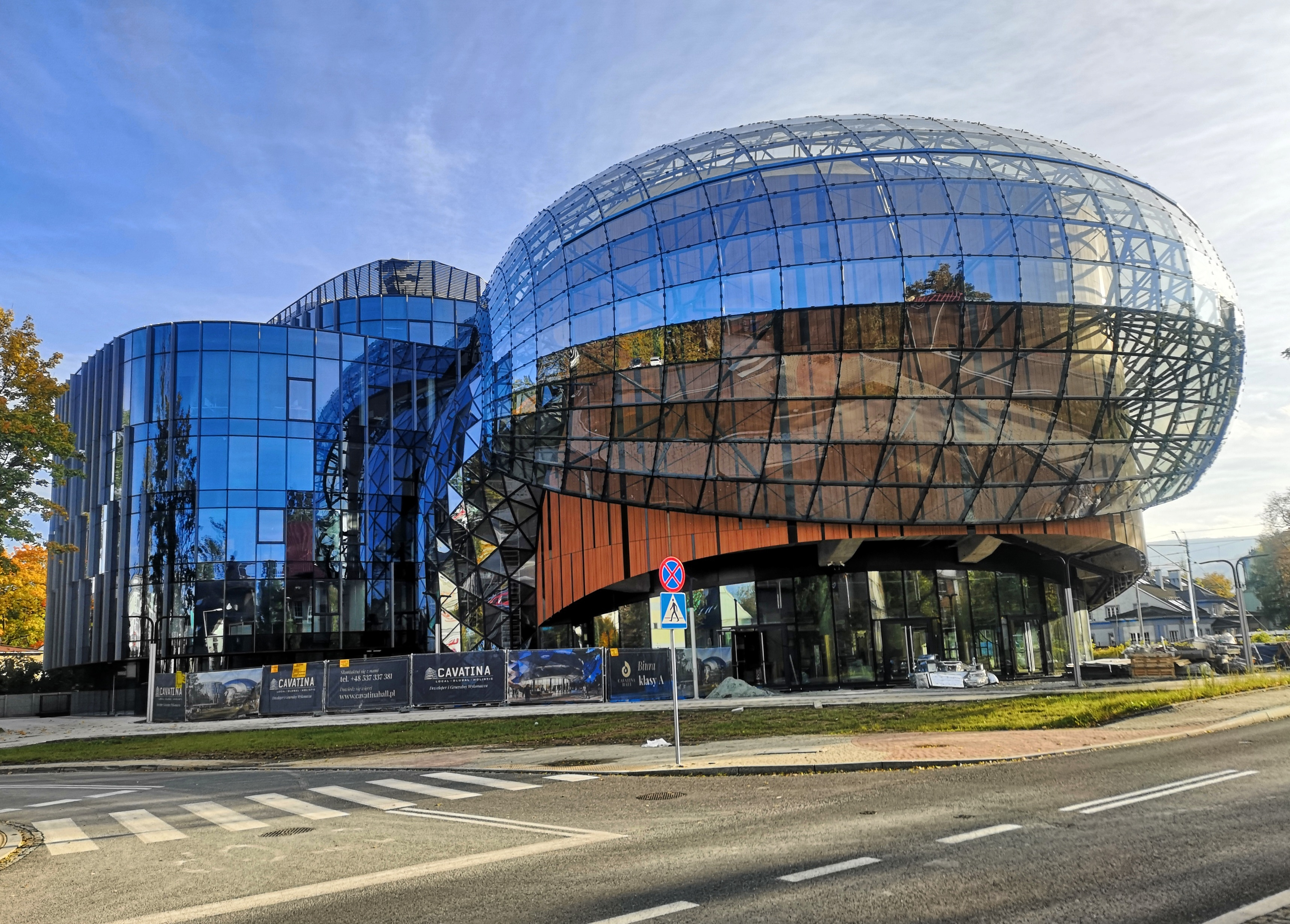
Cavatina Hall

In 2021, a modern concert hall named Cavatina Hall, with philharmonic parameters, was put into operation.

There are several orchestras and musical ensembles affiliated to the Maria Koterbska Bielsko-Biała Cultural Centre: Bielsko-Biała Chamber Orchestra (Bielska Orkiestra Kameralna), Bielsko-Biała Brass Band (Bielska Orkiestra Dęta), Bielsko-Biała Chamber Choir (Bielski Chór Kameralny), Ave Sol youth choir, "Bielsko" Song and Dance Ensemble (Zespół Pieśni i Tańca "Bielsko") and children's "Jarzębinki" Dance and Song Ensemble (Zespół Tańca i Piosenki "Jarzębinki"). In addition, the Telemann Orchestra (Orkiestra im. Telemanna) has been active in the city since 1993, aiming to promote early music.

From Bielsko-Biała come musical bands such as Akurat, Eye for an Eye, Grupa Furmana, Kapitan DA, Newbreed and Psio Crew.

=== Events ===
- Jazz Blizzard (Bielska Zadymka Jazzowa), an annual jazz music festival organized since 2002 by the Sztuka Teatr Association, headed by Jerzy Batycki. Zadymka is traditionally held (with the exception of the 2022 edition) in February or March using various stages in Bielsko-Biała (Teatr Polski, Klimat club, Cavatina Hall, outdoor concerts in the Market Square and others), as well as in Katowice and Zabrze.
- Jazz Autumn (Jazzowa Jesień), an annual jazz music festival held since 2003 at the end of November or the beginning of December by BCK
- International Festival of Puppetry Art (Międzynarodowy Festiwal Sztuki Lalkarskiej), a theatre festival held every two years in May since 1966 by the Banialuka Puppet Theatre
- Bielsko Autumn (Bielska Jesień), a national painting competition held since 1962 (until 1995 as an annual event, since then as a biennale) in November and December by Galeria Bielska BWA
- Bielsko-Biała Festival of Visual Arts (Bielski Festiwal Sztuk Wizualnych), a visual arts competition for artists connected to the Bielsko-Biała region held every four years since 2007 in summer by Galeria Bielska BWA
- FotoArtFestival, an international art photography biennale organized since 2005 in October by the Centre for Photography Foundation (Inez and Andrzej Baturo)
- Henryk Górecki Festival of Polish Composers (Festiwal Kompozytorów Polskich im. Henryka Góreckiego), a classical music festival held annually since 1996 in October by BCK
- International Sacred Music Festival "Sacrum in Musica" (Międzynarodowy Festiwal Sztuki Sakralnej "Sacrum in Musica"), a religious music festival held annually since 2000 in April by BCK
- International Choir Festival "Gaude Cantem" (Międzynarodowy Festiwal Chórów "Gaude Cantem"), a choir competition held annually in October since 2005 by the Polish Association of Choirs and Orchestras in cooperation with ROK
- "Fermenty" Comedy Festival (Festiwal Kabaretowy "Fermenty"), a comedy festival organized annually in September since 1999 by the "Fermenty" Creative Group in cooperation with BCK and MDK
- Week of Beskid Culture (Tydzień Kultury Beskidzkiej), an international folklore festival held every year at the turn of July and August since 1964 by ROK, primarily in Wisła, Szczyrk, Oświęcim, Żywiec and Maków Podhalański, but some events take place also in Bielsko-Biała
- Beskidy Oldtimer Rally (Beskidzki Rajd Pojazdów Zabytkowych), an annual classic rally held in July since 1977 by the Beskidy Car Club (Automobilklub Beskidzki). The culmination of the event is the presentation of the cars at the Town Hall Square in Bielsko-Biała, followed by the "Parade of Elegance" through the streets.
- Days of Bielsko-Biała (Dni Bielska-Białej), a series of diverse cultural events held annually at the turn of August and September
- Summer with Culture (Lato z Kulturą), a series of weekend outdoor concerts during July and August

Bielsko-Biała applied for the title of European Capital of Culture 2029. In October 2023, it was selected as one of the four final Polish candidates (alongside Kołobrzeg, Katowice and Lublin), but ultimately lost to Lublin. Some of the initiatives prepared for the ECoC as part of the competition proposal entitled City of Weaves are planned to be implemented thanks to the city being awarded the title of Polish Capital of Culture 2026.

== Education ==
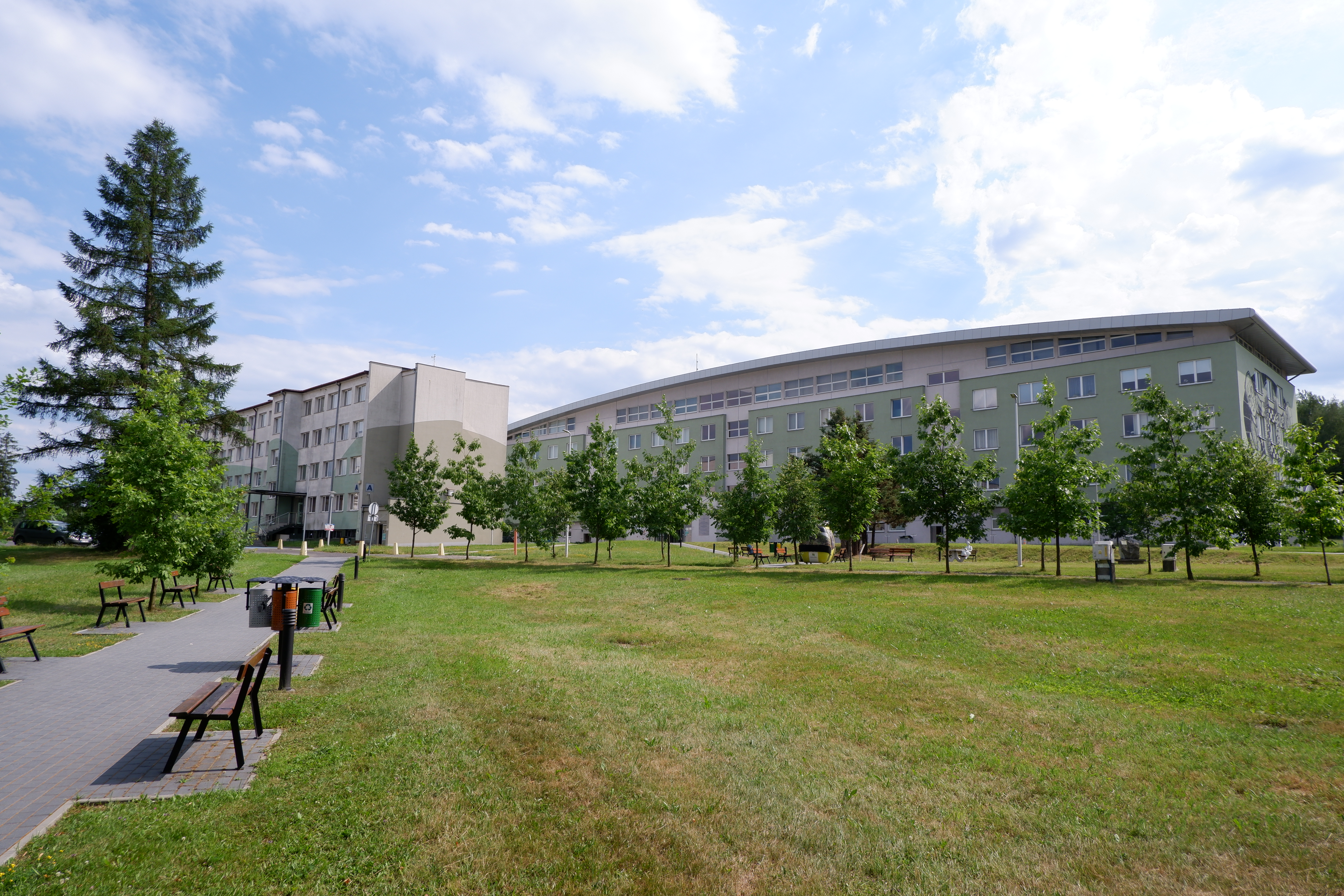
Campus of the University of Bielsko-Biała

University of Bielsko-Biała (Uniwersytet Bielsko-Bialski, until 2023 called in Polish Akademia Techniczno-Humanistyczna) was founded in 2001 through the transformation of the Bielsko-Biała branch of the Technical University of Łódź, which had existed since 1969. As of 2023, it is made up of five faculties: Faculty of Mechanical Engineering and Computer Science; Faculty of Materials, Construction and Environmental Engineering; Faculty of Management and Transport; Faculty of Humanities and Social Sciences; and Faculty of Health Sciences. In the 2022/2023 academic year, around five thousand students were educated there. The campus is located in the southern part of the city, in the Mikuszowice Śląskie district.

In 2023, a branch of the Medical University of Silesia opened in the city.

In addition, there are five private colleges established in the city in the 1990s:

- Higher School of Computer Science and Management (Wyższa Szkoła Informatyki i Zarządzania)
- Higher School of Finances and Law (Wyższa Szkoła Finansów i Prawa)
- Józef Tyszkiewicz Higher School of Bielsko-Biała (Bielska Wyższa Szkoła im. Józefa Tyszkiewicza)
- Higher School of Administration (Wyższa Szkoła Administracji), run by the Mikołaj Rej School Society associated with the Lutheran community
- Higher School of Economics and Humanities (Wyższa Szkoła Ekonomiczno-Humanistyczna)

== Economy ==
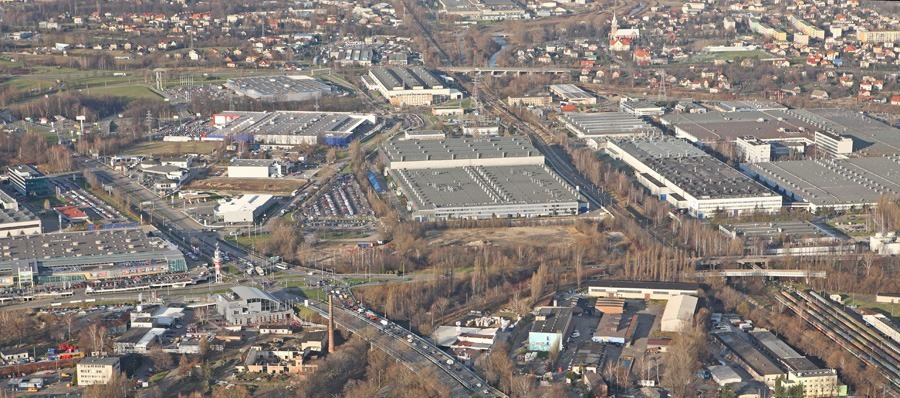
Aerial view of the Stellantis Poland plant (formerly Fiat Auto Poland)

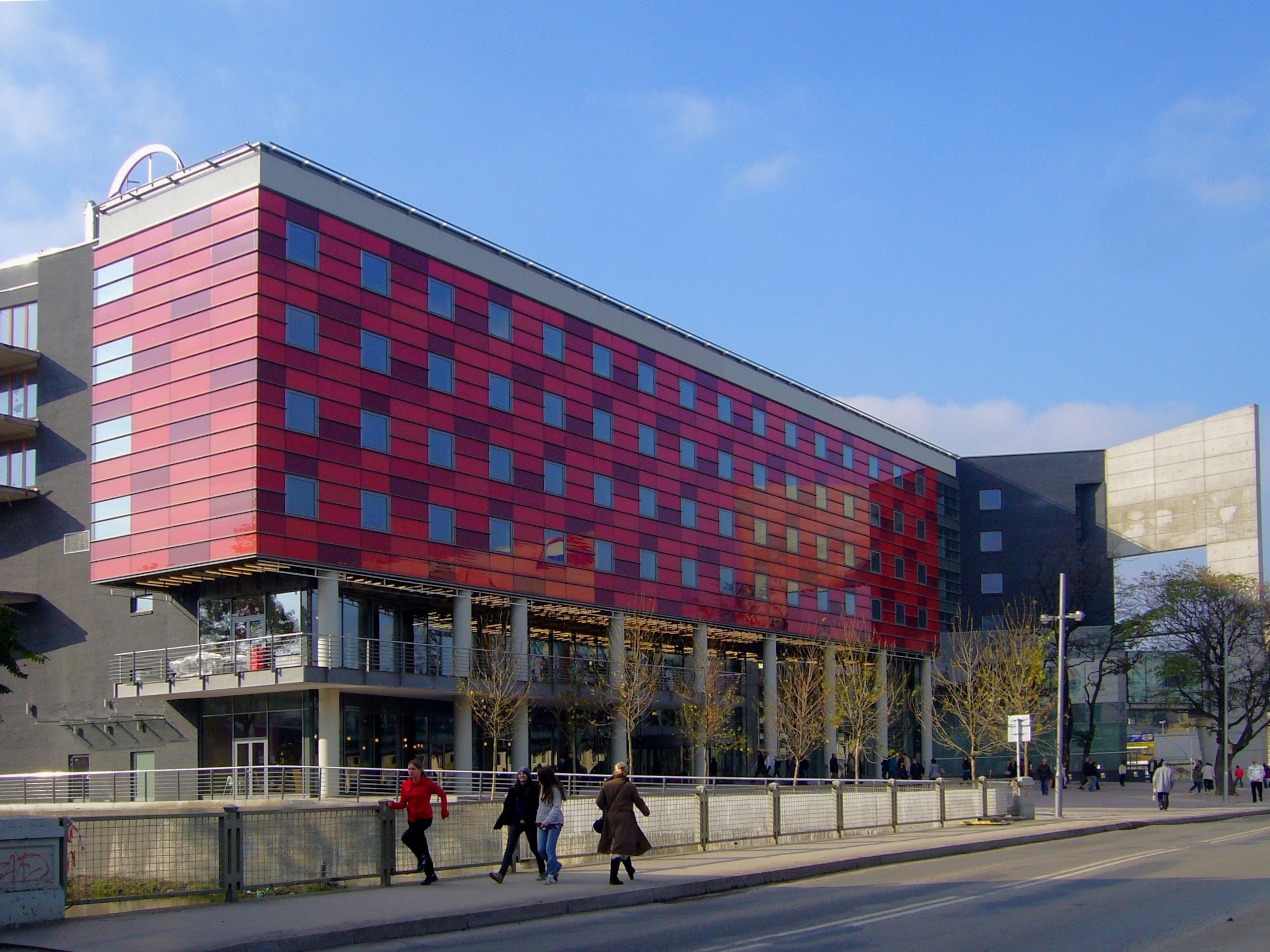
Galeria Sfera shopping mall

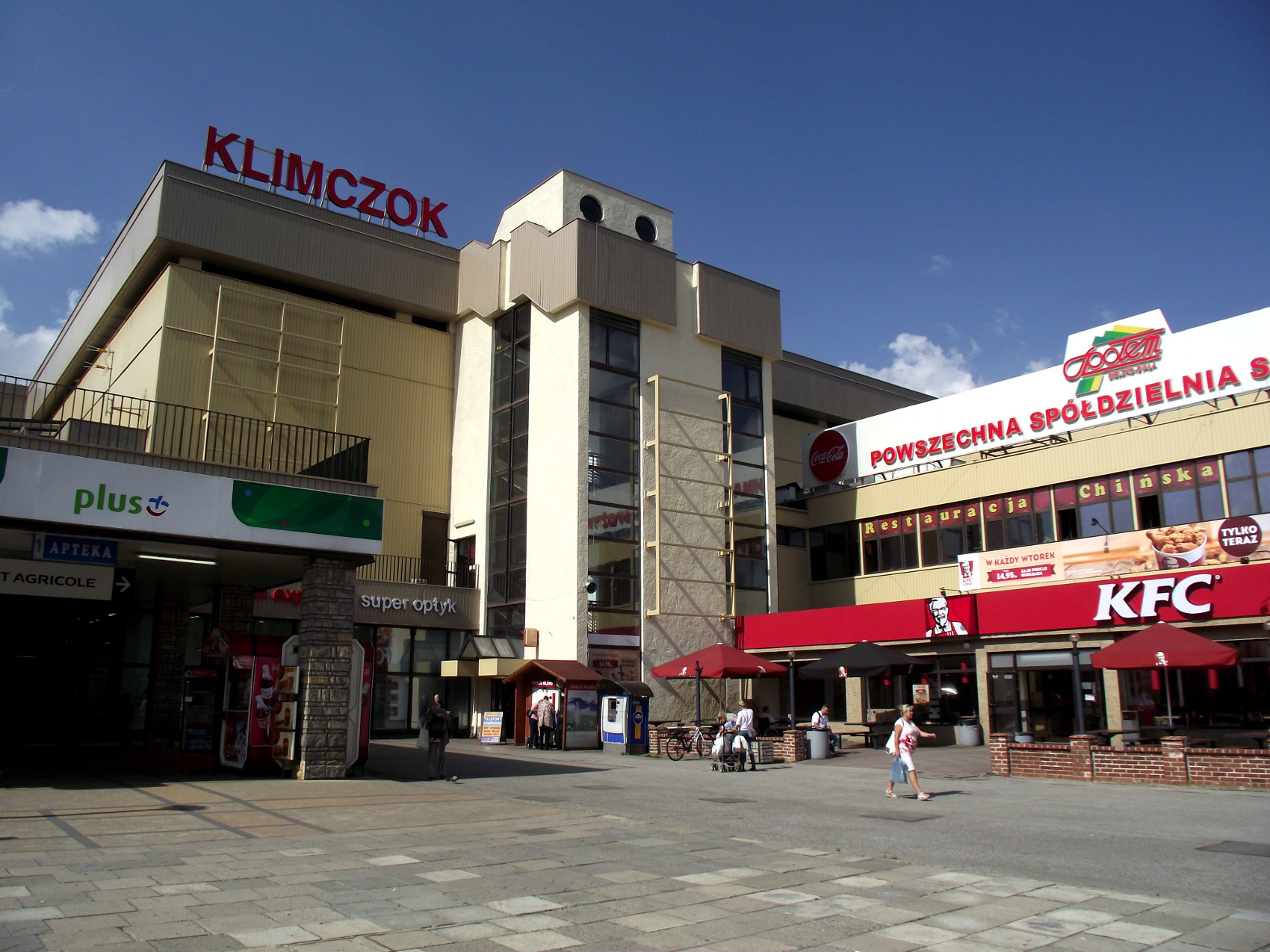
Klimczok department store

At the end of 2021, 27,799 enterprises were registered in the National Official Register of Entities of the National Economy. 26,724 (96.13%) of them were in the private sector, and 597 (2.14%) in the public sector. Enterprises employing up to 9 employees dominated, with 26,619. Only three enterprises had more than a thousand employees.

The unemployment rate was only 2.2% at the end of 2021 and was significantly lower than the national and provincial average (among the cities of the Silesian Voivodeship, it was lower only in Katowice and Tychy). The average gross monthly salary in Bielsko-Biała was PLN 5,789.65, which corresponded to 96.5% of the average gross monthly salary in Poland. Among the economically active residents, 4,700 people traveled to other cities to work, and 24,302 people came to work from outside the municipality, meaning that the balance of arrivals and departures to work was 19,602. 42.9% of people worked in industry and construction, 21.3% in the service sector, 2.3% in the financial sector, and 0.9% in agriculture.

Historically, Bielsko-Biała was an important industrial center, especially of the textile industry, which, however, completely lost its importance as a result of the economic transformation after 1989. Among the few factories today that continue these traditions are the Befaszczot brush factory, the Befado shoe factory, the Zipper zipper factory and the Rytex wool fabric manufacturer.

Currently, the largest industrial area is located in the northern part of the city between Komorowice, Stare Bielsko and Dolne Przedmieście. This is the former Fabryka Samochodów Małolitrażowych, which was taken over by Fiat Auto Poland during the transformation and since 2021 has been part of Stellantis Poland. While actual car production now takes place in Tychy, the plant in Bielsko-Biała produces engines. Since 2000, the area has been one of the sub-areas of the Katowice Special Economic Zone. In subsequent years, further areas in Wapienica, Komorowice and Lipnik were included. In 2021, a total of twenty enterprises employing more than 4.6 thousand workers operated on the 82-hectare area of the special economic zone.

Other important factories based in Bielsko-Biala include Bielmar, which produces margarines, oils and animal feed, as well as the Silesian Vodka Factory POLMOS Bielsko-Biała, where Extra Żytnia vodka is produced.

Bielsko-Biala is among the cities with the highest saturation of retail space in Poland. According to a 2019 report by Colliers International, it was 1,151 square metres (12,390 sq ft) per 1,000 residents. In total, the city had 197,000 square metres (2,120,000 sq ft) of retail space. As much as one-third of this figure fell on the largest shopping mall, which is Galeria Sfera. It consists of two buildings—Sfera I and Sfera II—erected on the site of former industrial plants and completed in 2001 and 2009, respectively. There are a number of other shopping facilities in the immediate vicinity, led by the "Klimczok" Cooperative Department Store owned by PSS Społem, which was built in 1988 and at the time was one of the largest in Poland. At the start of the 1990s an urban myth arose about the department store concerning drug users deliberately leaving blood on the escalators. The anthropologist Olga Drenda has suggested the story, relating to the contemporary HIV epidemic, is symbolic of the era of transition from communism. Other large shopping malls include Gemini Park in Leszczyny and Sarni Stok in the northern part of the city. There are also Auchan, Kaufland, Makro, Castorama and Leroy Merlin hypermarkets, as well as number of supermarkets and smaller retail outlets. The traditional shopping promenade is 11 Listopada Street. However, the number of stores and service outlets located through it has declined markedly in recent years, which is often attributed to the negative influence of large shopping malls. Outdoor marketplaces are located on Lompy and Broniewskiego Street, as well as in Komorowice Krakowskie.

The most important trade fairs held in Bielsko-Biala are the ENERGETAB Bielsko International Energy Fair organized by ZIAD Bielsko-Biała, as well as those whose organization is the responsibility of the ASTRA Promotion and Exhibition Office: the "Twój Dom" International Construction Fair, the "Instal-System" Fair of Heating Techniques and Energy Saving, and the EKOStyl International Fair. The main venue for the fairs is the multi-purpose hall on Karbowa Street.

== Transport ==
=== Rail transport ===
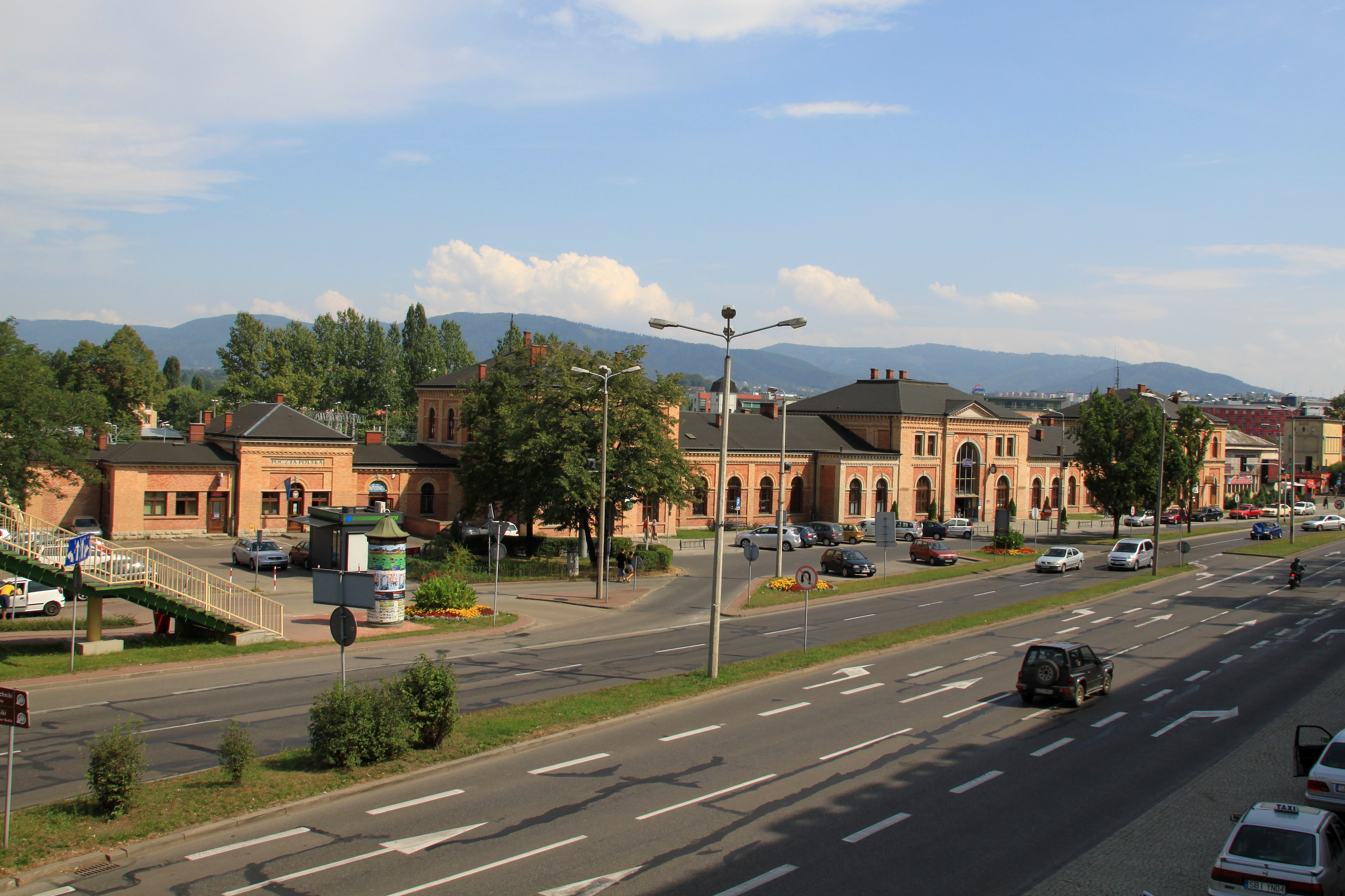
Bielsko-Biała Główna, the city's main train station

The railroad reached the city in 1855, when a branch of the Emperor Ferdinand Northern Railway was built. Currently, three railway lines cross the city:

- Railway line 117 to Kalwaria Zebrzydowska (Kraków direction)
- Railway line 139 from Katowice to Zwardoń
- Railway line 190 to Cieszyn and Český Těšín

Regional train services to Katowice and Zwardoń are operated by Silesian Railways, while Polregio trains run to Kalwaria Zebrzydowska and Kraków. In addition, Bielsko-Biała has connections with large Polish cities (Białystok, Bydgoszcz, Warsaw, Wrocław, Poznań, Gdańsk) by PKP Intercity express trains. Services on the line 190 were suspended in 2009. In 2023, plans were announced to restore trains on this route.

The main railway station is Bielsko-Biała Główna, located in the northern part of the city centre. In total, there are twelve railway stations and stops in the city, eight of which are currently (2023) open for passenger traffic.

=== Road transport ===
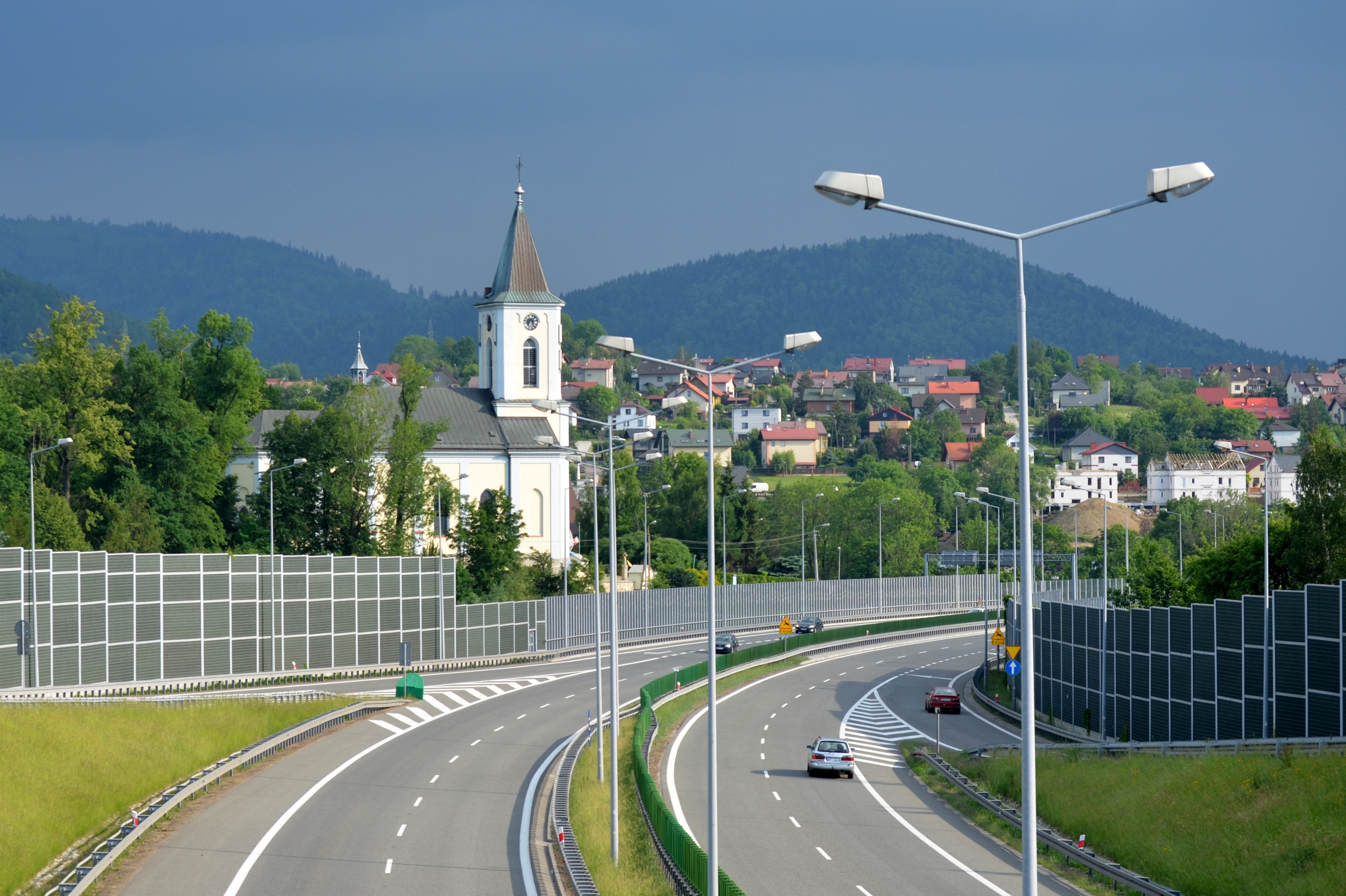
Expressway S52 in Bielsko-Biała

Bielsko-Biała is located within a short distance to Czech and Slovak borders on the crossroads of two expressways connecting Poland with neighbouring countries:

- Expressway S1 connects the city with Slovakia via the border town Zwardoń
- Expressway S52 connects the city with the Czech Republic via the border town Cieszyn

Bielsko-Biała is connected with the rest of Poland by the National road 1 (dual carriageway) running to Tychy where it intersects the Expressway S1 and further to Katowice where it intersects the Motorway A4.

It is planned to extend S1 north along the existing dual carriageway DK1 from Bielsko-Biała to Tychy and Katowice, thus building an expressway connection of the city with the national motorway network of Poland. National road 52 connects Bielsko-Biała with Kraków in the east. The most important interchange in the area is the cloverleaf north of Bielsko-Biała (Komorowice Śląskie district) where S1, DK1 and S52 meet.

Aleja Andersa and Bora-Komorowskiego Street constitute the Downtown Western Bypass (Śródmiejska Obwodnica Zachodnia), which connects the districts of Leszczyny, Kamienica, Aleksandrowice and Stare Bielsko to the junction with S52.

According to the June 2021 ranking, Bielsko-Biała had 826.7 registered vehicles per 1,000 inhabitants, including 681.3 passenger cars, which means that it was the ninth most motorized city in Poland and the second (after Katowice) in the Silesian Voivodeship.

=== Public transport ===
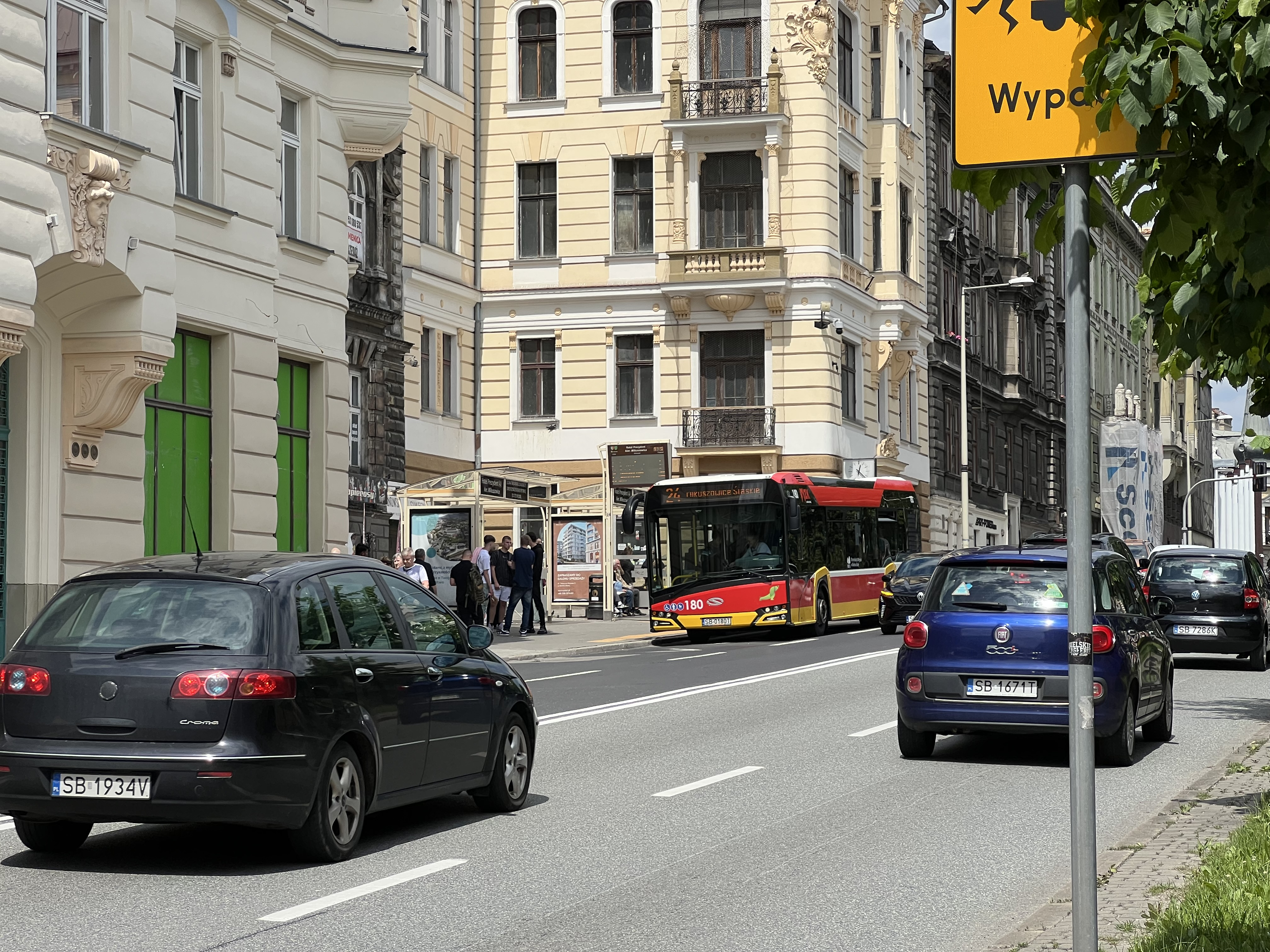
MZK city bus at 3 Maja Street

The public transport system in the city has been in existence since 1895. Until 1972 it included a tram network, and since 1927 also a bus network which is currently the only one.

The main carrier is Miejski Zakład Komunikacyjny w Bielsku-Białej (Municipal Transport Company of Bielsko-Biała, MZK), which in 2023 served transport on 40 daily and two night bus lines. Four of them went outside the city limits: to Czechowice-Dziedzice, Bystra, Wilkowice and Janowice. Some stops in Bielsko-Biała are also served by three lines of PKM Czechowice-Dziedzice, a municipal bus company from the neighbouring town, marked with numbers 5, VII and X (to distinguish from "7" and "10" of MZK). The fares and timetables of the two carriers are not coordinated.

Regional bus transport within the Bielsko County, as well as towards Kęty, Andrychów and Chybie, is operated by Komunikacja Beskidzka established in 2021 as a result of the transformation of the former PKS Bielsko-Biała. The bus station from which the KB lines (numbered from 100 upwards) and long-distance bus connections depart, is located at Warszawska Street opposite the Bielsko-Biała Główna railway station.

There also small private bus companies operating in the region, e.g. Linea Trans with services to Strumień and to Cieszyn via Skoczów, Konkret Bus for Brzeszcze and Oświęcim, or Żądło going to Szczyrk. Their stops are located near the station: at Warszawska, Podwale and Wałowa Street.

=== Airports ===
There are 3 international airports within a 90 km (56 mi) radius of Bielsko-Biała, all serving connections with major European cities: Katowice International Airport, Kraków John Paul II International Airport, Ostrava Leoš Janáček Airport.

In Aleksandrowice there is an airport with a unpaved runway used by the Aeroclub of Bielsko-Biała for sports purposes. Another airport in the vicinity is Bielsko-Biała Kaniów Airport, which is part of the Bielsko-Biała Technology Park of Aviation, Entrepreneurship and Innovation.

== Sports ==
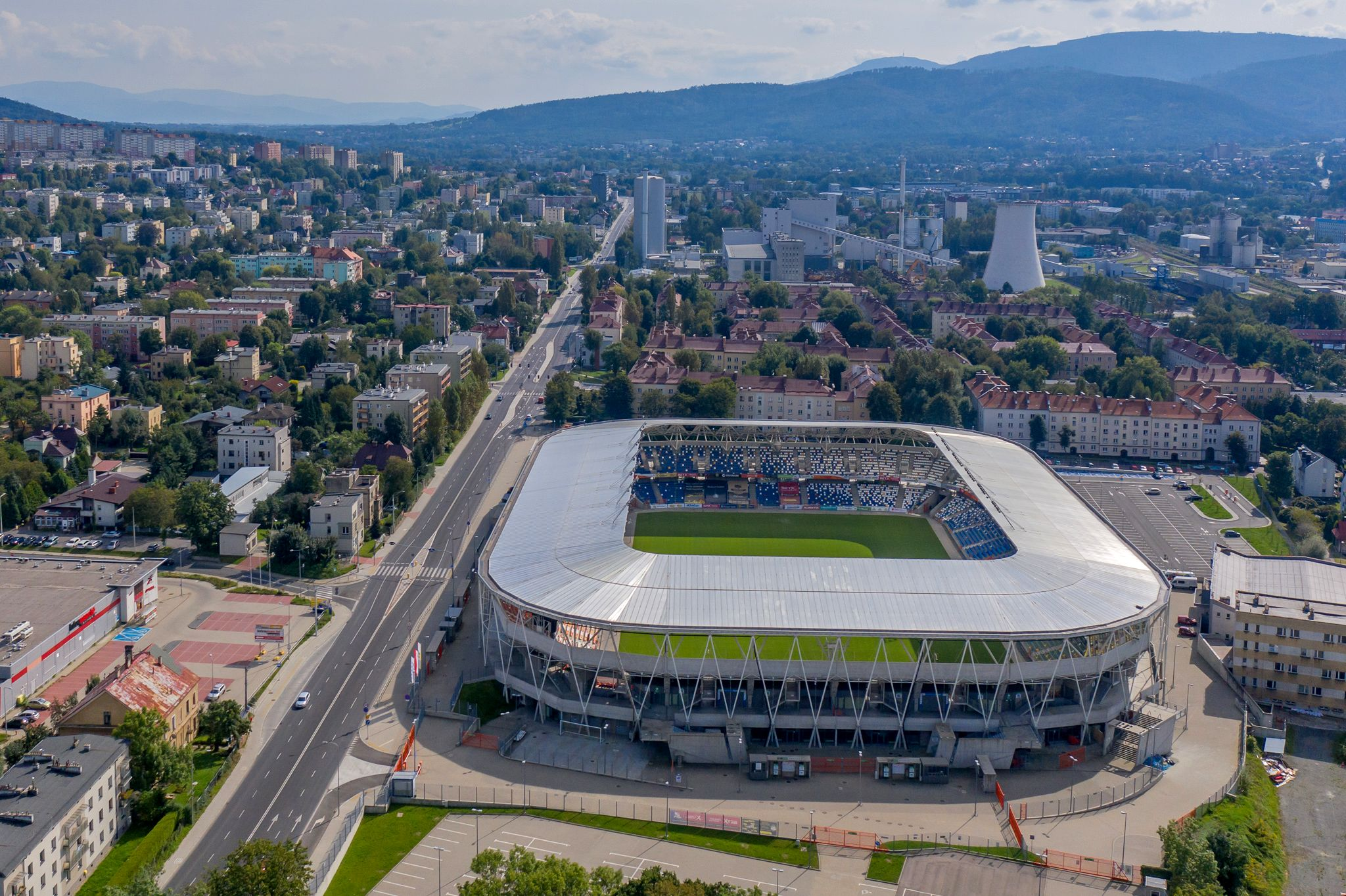
Municipal Stadium, the home stadium of TS Podbeskidzie and BKS Stal football teams

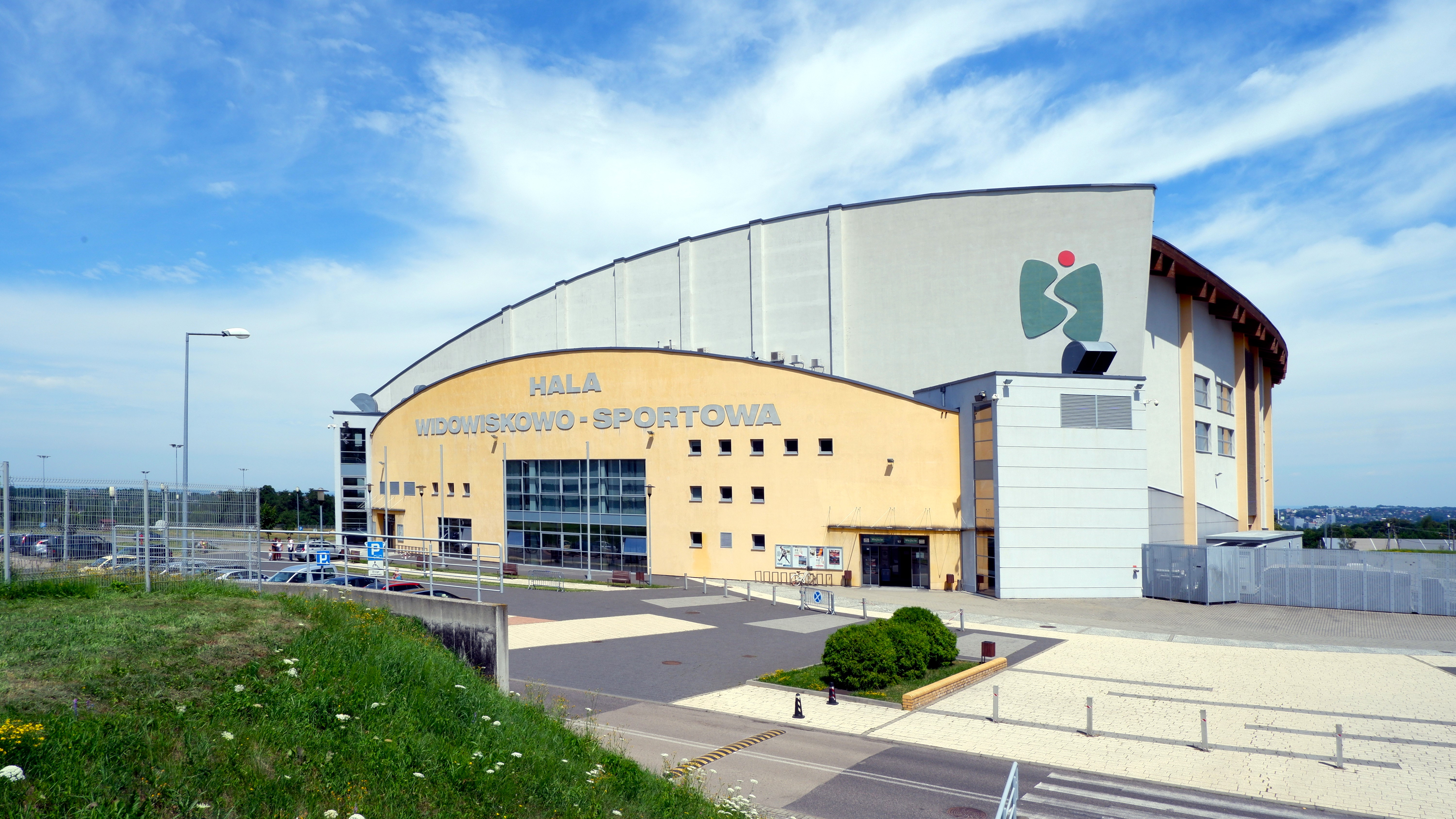
Dębowiec Sports Arena

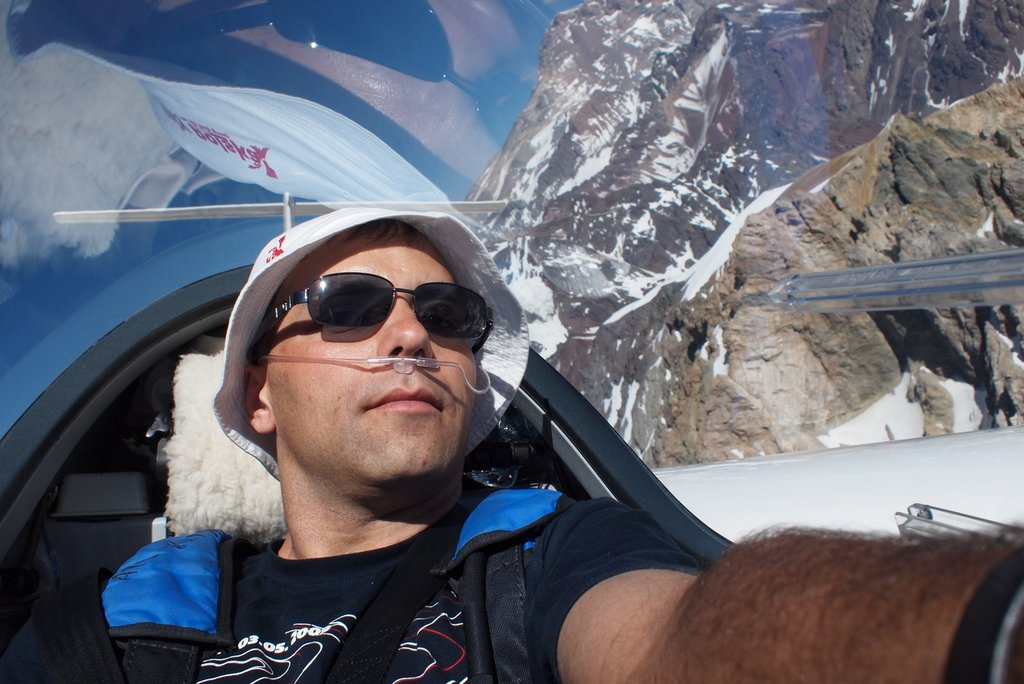
Sebastian Kawa

The city co-hosted the 1978 UEFA European Under-18 Championship, 2009 European Youth Olympic Winter Festival, 2019 FIFA U-20 World Cup and 2023 European Games.

=== Major teams and athletes ===
- TS Podbeskidzie Bielsko-Biała – men's football team playing in the II liga, Poland's third division
- BKS Stal Bielsko-Biała
  - women's volleyball team playing continuously since 1976 in the highest level of women's volleyball in Poland; Polish Champions 1988, 1989, 1990, 1991, 1996, 2003, 2004, 2010; Polish Cup winners 1955, 1979, 1988, 1989, 1990, 2004, 2006, 2009
  - men's football team playing in the regional league
- BBTS Bielsko-Biała – men's volleyball team playing in the Plus Liga; Polish Cup winner 1994
- BTS Rekord Bielsko-Biała – men's futsal team playing in the Futsal Ekstraklasa, Polish Champions 2014, 2017, 2018, 2019, 2020, 2021; Polish Cup winner 2013, 2018, 2019, 2022; Polish Supercup winners 2013, 2017, 2018, 2019, 2022; also the women's futsal team plays in the top league
- Podbeskidzie Kuloodporni Bielsko-Biała – an amputee football club playing in the Amp Futbol Ekstraklasa, Polish Champions 2019
- KS Sprint – a track and field club based in Wapienica which organized the international athletics meeting Beskidianathletic
- KS Gwardia Bielsko-Biała – a judo club
- Sebastian Kawa, member of the Bielsko-Biała Aeroclub, is the sixteen-time World Gliding Champion, FAI world leading glider competition pilot (as of 2023, number one in the world rankings of the FAI Gliding Commission) and the current World Champion in 15m Class and European gliding champion in 18m Class

== Politics ==
Bielsko-Biala is a city with county rights, and also forms a single municipality (gmina) in its entirety. The mayor of the city since 2018 is Jarosław Klimaszewski, elected as a candidate of the Civic Coalition.

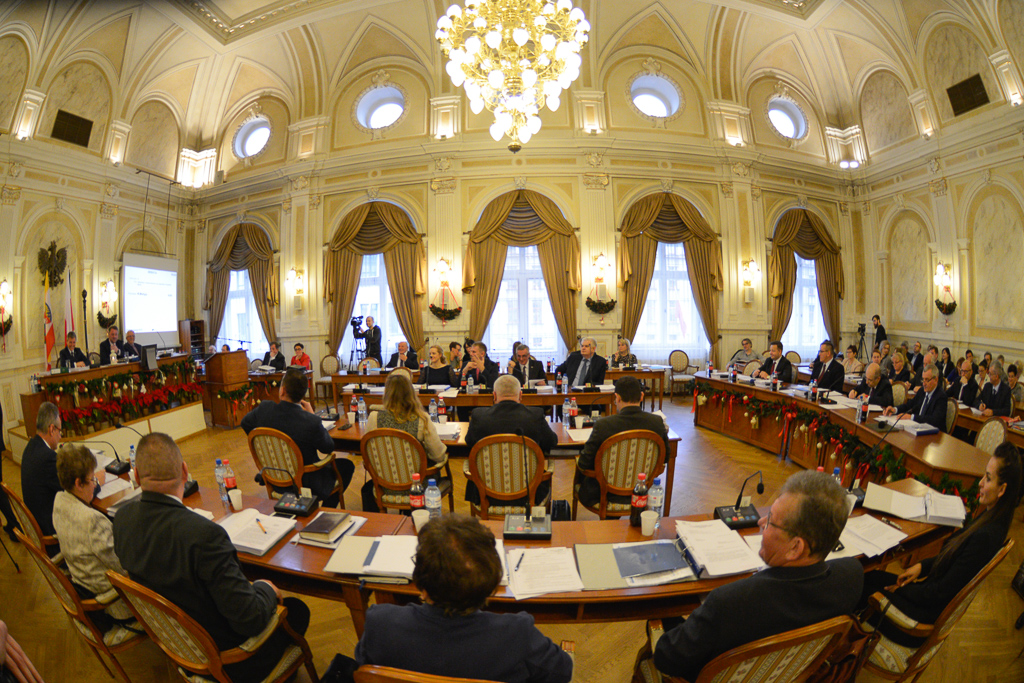
City council meeting hall

The results of the city council elections for the 2024-2029 term were as follows:

Electoral committee	Votes	%	Seats	+/-
Civic Coalition (KO)	18,531	29.94	9	+2
Law and Justice (PiS)	16,189	26.16	9	-1
Electoral Committee of Jarosław Klimaszewski	13,747	19.20	7	±0
Zarębska and Independents.BB	4,404	7.12	0	-4
Confederation Liberty and Independence	3,574	5.77	0	±0
Third Way	3,065	4.95	0	±0
Good City Committee	2,110	3.41	0	±0
October Coalition Committee	837	1.35	0	±0
Valid votes	61,890	98.80		
Blank and invalid votes	751	1.19		
Total	62,641	100	25	±0
Abstentions	63,598	50.37		
Registered voters / Turnout	126,239	49.62		
(Source: National Electoral Commission)

In the Sejm elections, Bielsko-Biała is part of constituency No. 27 along with Bielsko, Cieszyn, Pszczyna and Żywiec counties. The following deputies represent the constituency in the 2023-2027 term:

Party	Names of elected deputies	% of votes for the party in the constituency	% of votes for the party in the city of Bielsko-Biała
Law and Justice (PiS)	Przemysław Drabek; Krzysztof Gaża; Grzegorz Puda; Stanisław Szwed	36.71	30.13
Civic Coalition (KO)	Mirosława Nykiel; Małgorzata Pępek; Apoloniusz Tajner	28.67	35.53
Poland 2050 / Third Way	Mirosław Suchoń	14.55	14.49
Confederation Liberty and Independence	Bronisław Foltyn	7.84	7.26
(Source: National Electoral Commission)

In the Senate elections, Bielsko-Biała is part of constituency No. 78 along with Bielsko and Pszczyna counties. For the 2032-2027 term, the constituency is represented by Agnieszka Gorgoń-Komor of the Civic Coalition.

Bielsko-Biala is the seat of the Bielsko County authorities and one of the three—along with Žilina and Frýdek-Místek—capitals of the Euroregion Beskydy. It also houses the delegations of the Silesian Voivodeship Office and the Marshal's Office of the Silesian Voivodeship.

=== Twin towns – sister cities ===
Bielsko-Biała is twinned with:

- Acre, Israel
- Baia Mare, Romania
- Besançon, France
- Berdyansk, Ukraine
- Frýdek-Místek, Czech Republic
- Grand Rapids, United States
- Kirklees, United Kingdom
- Kragujevac, Serbia
- Nyíregyháza, Hungary
- Szolnok, Hungary
- Tienen, Belgium
- Třinec, Czech Republic
- Ustka, Poland
- Wolfsburg, Germany
- Žilina, Slovakia

== Notable people ==
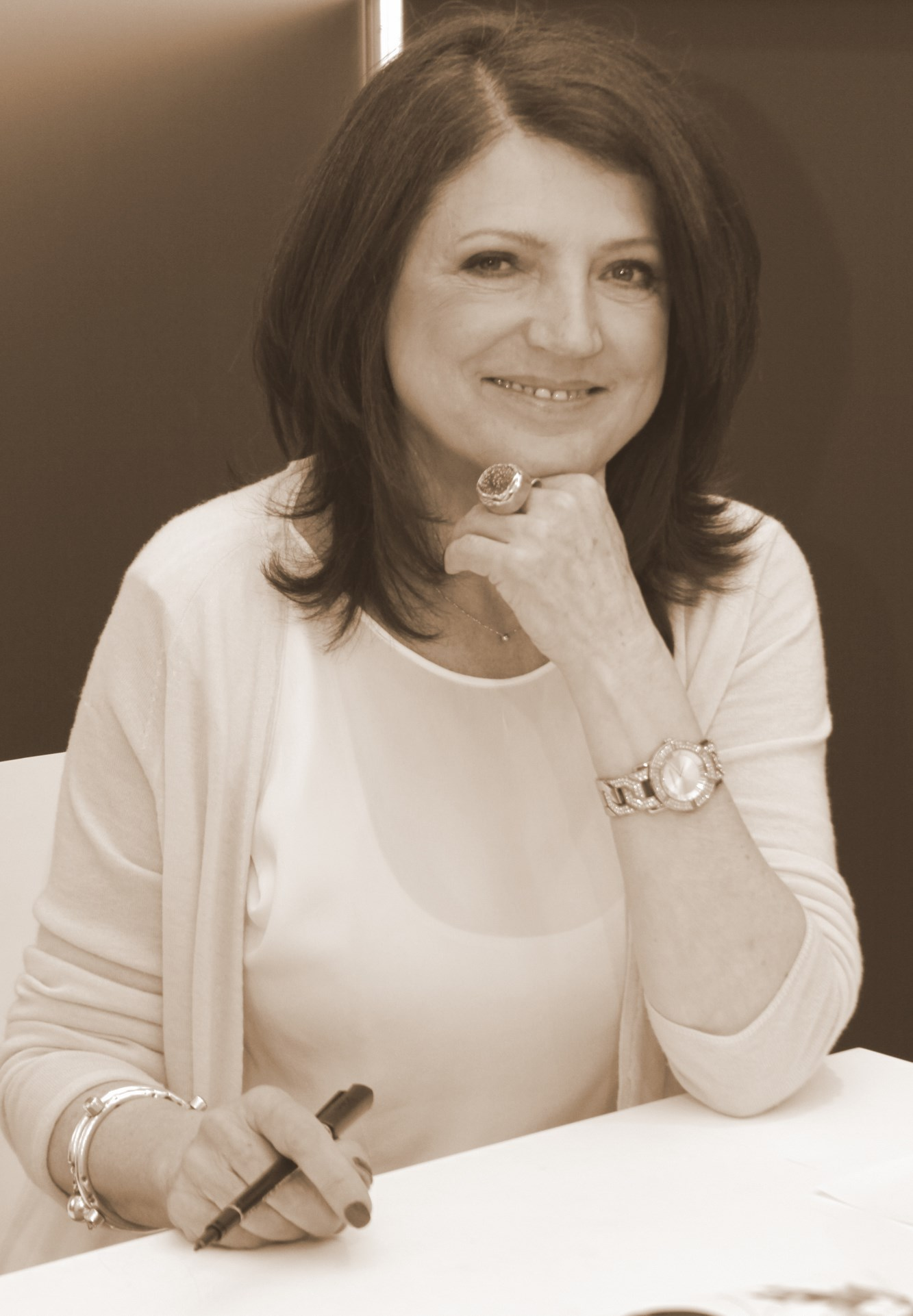
Urszula Dudziak

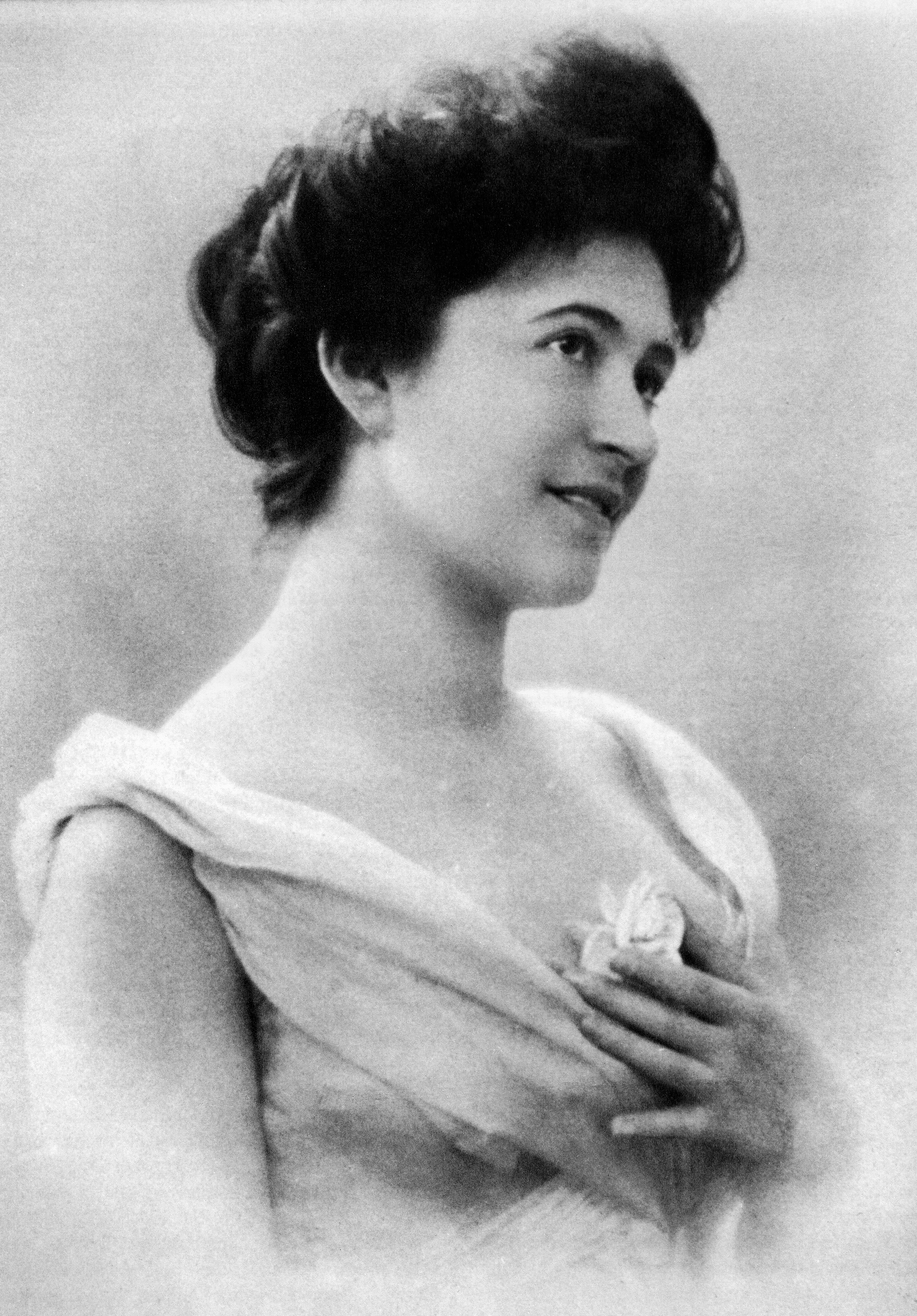
Selma Kurz

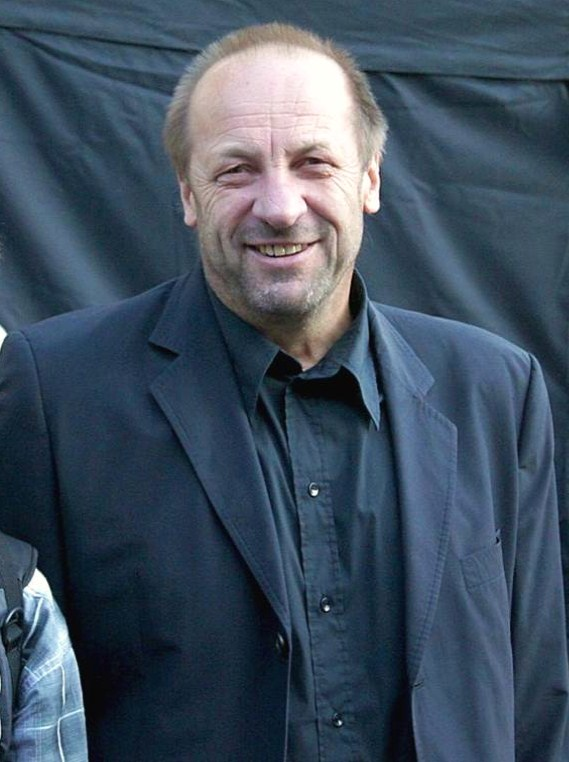
Zbigniew Preisner

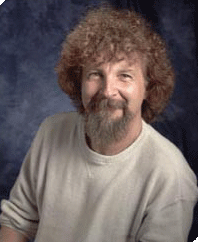
Wojciech H. Zurek

- Shlomo Avineri (born 1933), political scientist and philosopher, professor at the Hebrew University
- Wilhelm Bachner (1912-1991), engineer and Holocaust survivor
- Carl Josef Bayer (1847–1904), chemist who invented the Bayer process
- Maurice Bloomfield (1855–1928), philologist and Sanskrit scholar
- Peter Michal Bohúň (1822–1879), painter
- Heinrich Conried (1855–1909), theatrical manager and director
- Marek Dopierała (born 1960), sprint canoeist, two-time Olympic medallist
- Urszula Dudziak (born 1943), jazz vocalist
- Piotr Fijas (born 1958), ski jumper, all-time parallel style world record holder
- Mateusz Gamrot (born 1990), mixed martial artist
- Alfred Hetschko (1898–1967), music educator
- Adolf Hyła (1897–1965), painter and art teacher
- Jolanta Januchta (born 1955), middle-distance runner
- Małgorzata Klimek (born 1957), mathematical physicist
- Sławomir Kołodziej (born 1961), mathematician
- Jacek Koman (born 1956), actor and singer
- Maria Koterbska (born 1924), singer
- Jan Kotrč (1862–1943), chess master, chess publisher and chess problem composer
- Alfred von Kropatschek (1838–1911), weapons designer and general of the Austro-Hungarian Army
- Selma Kurz (1874–1933), opera singer, dramatic coloratura soprano
- Jacek Lech (1947–2007), singer
- Przemysław Lechowski (born 1977), classical pianist
- Piotr Łącz (born 1998), boxer
- Karl Olma (1914–2001), writer and popularist of the Alzenau dialect
- Tadeusz Pietrzykowski (1917–1991), boxer and soldier, known as the "boxing champion of Auschwitz"
- Radosław Piwowarski (born 1948), film director, screenwriter and actor
- Zbigniew Preisner (born 1955), film score composer best known for his work with Krzysztof Kieślowski
- Renata Przemyk (born 1966), singer and songwriter
- Aneta Sablik (born 1989), singer and songwriter
- Artur Schnabel (1882–1951), classical pianist, composer and pedagogue
- Hugo von Seeliger (1849–1924), astronomer
- Oswald Seeliger (1858–1908), zoologist
- Kriss Sheridan (born 1989), singer, songwriter, actor, model and traveler
- Jan Smeterlin (1892-1967), concert pianist specializing in Chopin
- Bohdan Smoleń (1947–2016), comedian, singer and actor
- Josef Strzygowski (1862–1941), art historian
- Jan Szarek (1936–2020), bishop of the Evangelical-Augsburg Church in Poland
- Kacper Tomasiak (born 2007), ski jumper
- Gerda Weissmann Klein (1924–2022), Holocaust survivor, writer and human rights activist
- Sabina Wojtala (born 1981), figure skater
- Karol Wojtyła (1879–1941), Austro-Hungarian and Polish army officer, father of Pope John Paul II
- Jakub Wolny (born 1995), ski jumper
- Aleksander Zawadzki (1798–1868), Polish naturalist
- Emil Zegadłowicz (1888–1941), poet, prose writer, novelist, playwright and translator
- Sigmund Zeisler (1860–1931), lawyer, known for his defense of radicals in Chicago in the 1880s
- Wojciech H. Zurek (born 1951), theoretical physicist and a leading authority on quantum theory
