= Coat of arms of Bielsko-Biała =

Coat of arms of Bielsko-Biała

The coat of arms of Bielsko-Biała is one of the city's four symbols, alongside the flag, logo, and bugle call. It was officially established on 7 December 2004 by Resolution No. XXXVII/1189/2004 of the City Council in Bielsko-Biała.

This coat of arms developed following the merger of Biała and Bielsko in 1951 and is one of the few in municipal heraldry to feature two escutcheons. Such a composition is exceptionally permitted only when a city is formed by merging two separate cities with distinct coats of arms deeply rooted in tradition.

== Appearance ==
The coat of arms features two escutcheons. In the right, vertically divided escutcheon, the right blue field contains a golden (yellow) half-eagle facing right, without a crown, while the left red field contains three individual white (silver) heraldic lilies arranged vertically. In the second escutcheon, on a green field, there are two red five-petaled roses arranged horizontally.

== Symbolism ==
The right escutcheon represents the historical coat of arms of Bielsko, while the left escutcheon represents the historical coat of arms of Biała.

=== Coat of arms of Bielsko ===
==== Eagle ====
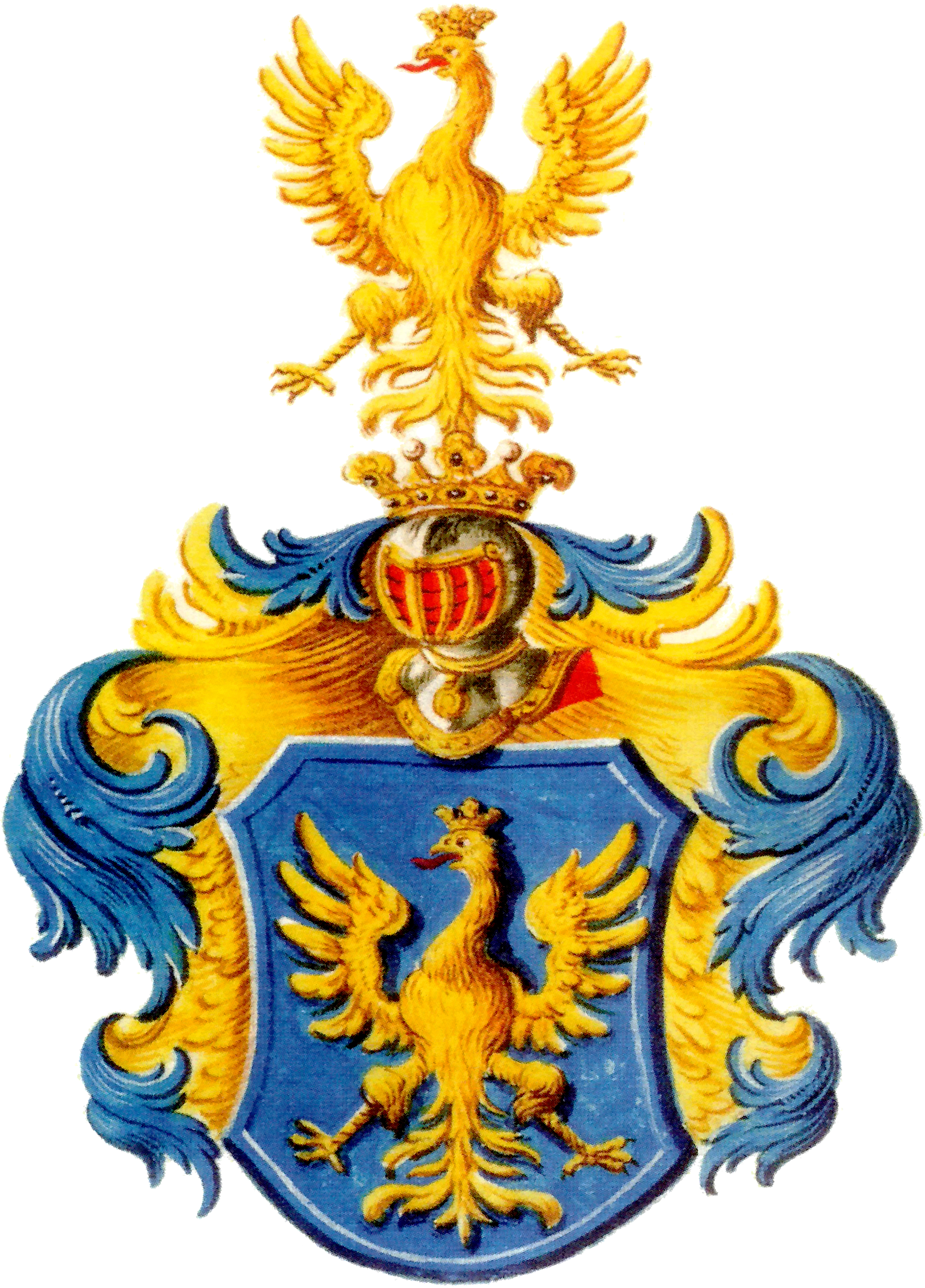
Coat of arms of the Dukes of Cieszyn

The right section of the vertically divided escutcheon contains half of the emblem of the Dukes of Cieszyn – an eagle depicted in a heraldic arrangement, with its head facing right.

Ideologically, the eagle of the Dukes of Cieszyn, directly derived from the Piast eagle, represents a typical feudal motif – the sovereign secular authority of the duke over a given territory, as well as the property relations prevailing during the era of the coat of arms' creation. It symbolizes the complete subordination of the town of Bielsko to the Duke of Cieszyn and, more broadly, to a representative of the Piast dynasty.

The colors – a golden eagle on a blue or azure field – have their origins in French heraldry. Gold signifies the power, dignity, and nobility of the eagle's owner, symbolizing royal or ducal majesty. In combination with gold, blue denotes sovereignty and independence, order, as well as virtues desirable in the chivalric ethos – loyalty and steadfastness of the family adopting this color. Additionally, blue was traditionally associated with Mary.

The eagle likely changed its appearance over the years, but it did not incorporate the heraldic element introduced to the emblem of the Dukes of Cieszyn during the reign of Casimir II – the crown.

==== Lilies ====
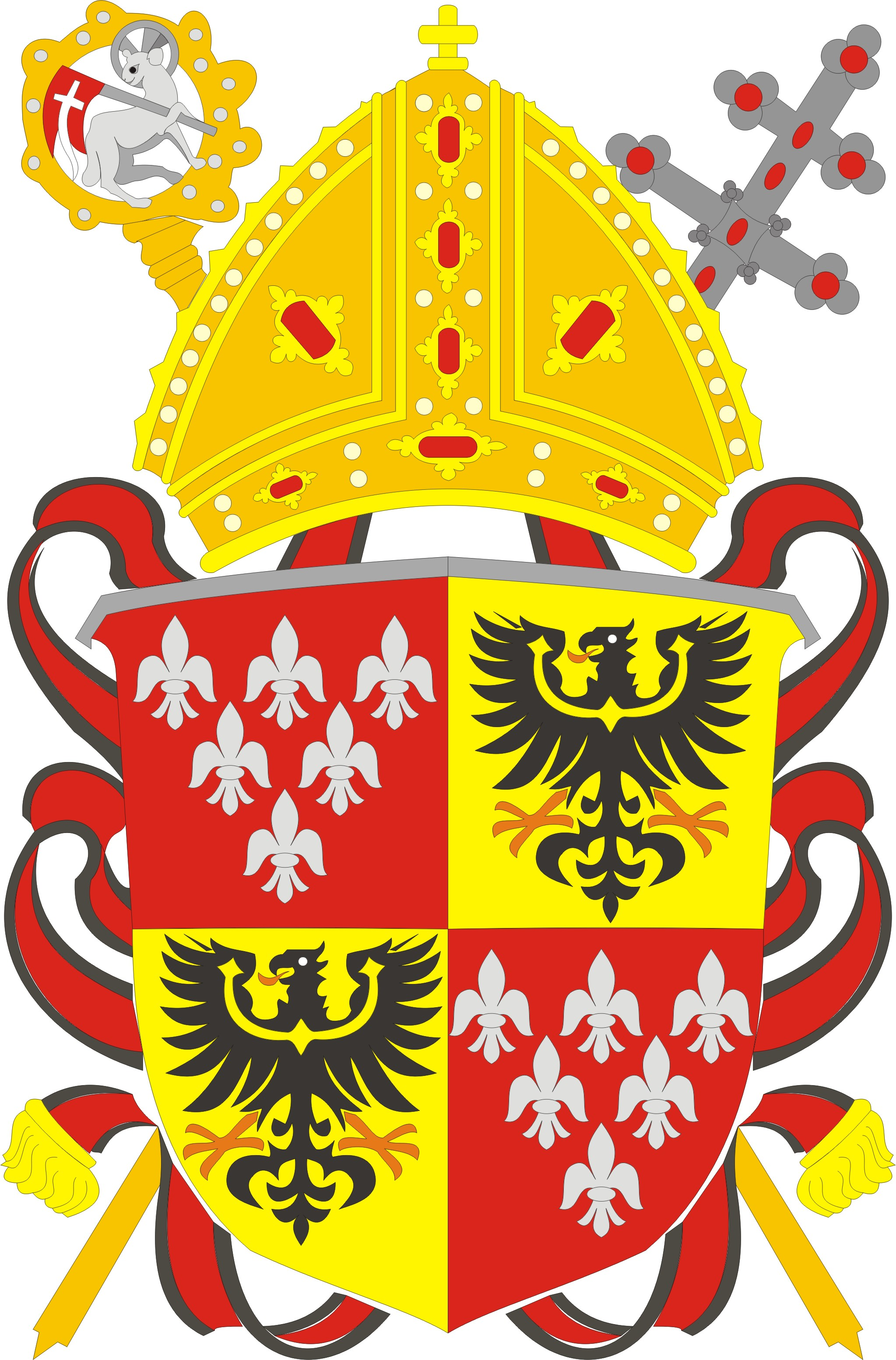
Coat of arms of the Archdiocese of Wrocław

Three white (silver) lilies arranged vertically on a red field are a modified version of the emblem of the Bishops of Wrocław.

The shape of the lilies, a typical and widespread heraldic symbol found in many European coats of arms, changed frequently during the 14th and 15th centuries. However, they always featured three petals connected by a small band. Lilies are among the oldest European graphic and symbolic signs, originating from ancient Greece. In medieval symbolism, they were – alongside the cross – one of the most important symbols of the church, representing Mary and John the Baptist, the patron of the Wrocław Cathedral. Therefore, adopting this symbol by the Bishops of Wrocław was entirely natural.

The colors of the coat of arms of the Bishops of Wrocław are known from sources dating back to the 14th century. The white color of the lilies is one of the most important colors in Christianity, symbolizing light, purity, and above all, the eternal glory of God and the church. The red field of the episcopal emblem is closely connected to the lily, and thus to the church and Christian symbolism. It represents the blood of Christ. Therefore, the left half of the coat of arms of Bielsko reflects, in a deeper sense, the most important truths of the Christian faith related to Christ and Mary, connecting the city with all of Christianity.

=== Coat of arms of Biała ===
Coat of arms of Biała with a Spanish escutcheon

The left escutcheon, representing the coat of arms of Biała, features two red, five-petaled roses on a green field.

The rose was a common heraldic symbol in European and Polish coats of arms. Despite the late creation of this particular coat of arms, in an era already influenced by certain ahistorical heraldic practices, it still possesses a clear symbolism.

In the chronicle of Biała, written by Wacław Chamrat around 1813, the meaning of the city's coat of arms is explained as follows: "The coat of arms with two red roses on a green field, which at the time had its meaningful significance, symbolized that the town of Biała – where the market square still had green crops like those in foreign fields at that time – should grow just as a pair of young roses on a green field".

In heraldic symbolism, this coat of arms can be interpreted in two ways: either in a Christianizing sense or according to the Baroque-Sarmatian style. In the first interpretation, the red rose symbolizes martyrdom and the blood of Christ in its aspect of Redemption, a foreshadowing of humanity's happiness. Green, on the other hand, symbolizes hope for God's mercy and the promise of eternal life. The second interpretation refers to a foretelling of prosperity and happiness for the young town and its "young" citizens, achievable through daily work and great effort in striving towards God.

== History ==
=== Coat of arms of Bielsko ===
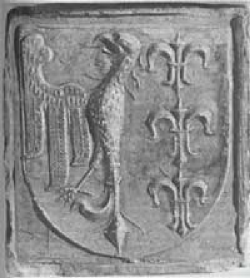
Coat of arms of Bielsko on a tile from the mid-16th century

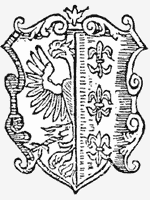
Coat of arms of Bielsko in Sacra ac debita templi movi inauguratis, 1610

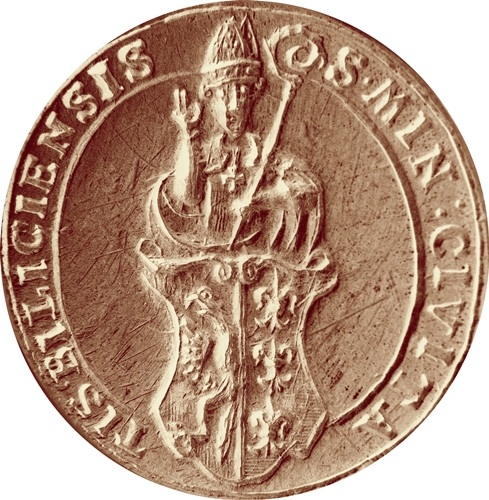
Seal of the city of Bielsko from the 18th century

Bielsko was founded at the end of the 13th century (probably during a wave of settlement between 1285 and 1300 organized by the Duke of Cieszyn, Mieszko I) and, from its inception until the mid-16th century, belonged to the Duchy of Cieszyn. The first written mention of the city dates back to 1312; however, it was not until 1424 that the city became fully self-governing, when Bolesław I granted renewed municipal rights. At that time, the local authorities were required to have a proprietary seal, which was used, among other things, on the city seal.

The first preserved impression of the city seal comes from a document issued in 1542. It was made in the Gothic style and has a diameter of 40 mm. The seal depicts Saint Nicholas (the city's patron saint) seated on a throne in pontifical attire, wearing a mitre and holding a crozier, with a halo around his head. His legs are obscured by a stylized two-part escutcheon (split vertically). In the right section of the escutcheon is half of a heraldic eagle with three large feathers in its wing (symbolizing the Dukes of Cieszyn), while in the left section are three fleurs-de-lis arranged vertically (a modified version of the coat of arms of the Bishops of Wrocław). This is a typical coat of arms composed of a escutcheon and an ordinary, containing characteristic medieval symbols for cities: the patron saint and symbols referring to the rulers. This seal was likely used until the end of the Piast rule, which ended in 1572, when the Duchy of Bielsko was created, governed by the noble families of Promnitz, Schaffgotsch, and Sunnegh.

The appearance of the coat of arms of Bielsko in the 15th and 16th century is also known thanks to a glazed stove tile with a green coating, measuring 19.5 × 21 cm, discovered in 1900 and now housed in the Historical Museum of Kraków. The tile depicts the coat of arms, with half of the eagle (with the head slightly turned to the left and a large wing reaching the height of the head with three large feathers) in the right section of the Gothic escutcheon, and three stylized lilies with bent upper petals in the left section. Unlike the coat of arms on the seal, there is no image of St. Nicholas. Marian Gumowski, who studied the history of the coat of arms of Bielsko-Biała in the first half of the 20th century, based on historical sources – a Latin text by Andreas Perstenius from 1608, Sacra ac debita templi movi inauguratis published by Pastor Lucas Wencelius in 1610, and the 18th-century chronicle of Ernst Otipka – concluded that the coat of arms is older than the 15th century and was granted at the time of the city's founding.

The next city seals, a large one with a diameter of 42 mm and a small one with a diameter of 25 mm, dating from the late 16th century and used until around the mid-17th century, feature identical heraldic representations: St. Nicholas standing, facing forward without a halo, the bishop's lilies depicted in a rather ascetic, "sketchy" style, and the eagle with its head turned to the right and five large feathers in its wing. The coat of arms of Bielsko in the work of Pastor Lucas Wencelius, Sacra ac debita templi movi inauguratis from 1610, shows a Renaissance style. On this version, as well as on seals from the 18th century, the eagle's head is turned to the right, resembling the half double-headed eagle of the Holy Roman Empire's coat of arms. However, there were no changes to the coat of arms colors or the lilies, and the crown did not appear.

Significant modifications were made to the medieval coat of arms in the 1833 trade escutcheon. The eagle is unnaturally tilted above its wings and has a long tongue, while the lilies resemble two connected letters "W". However, the heraldic colors were preserved: a golden eagle on a dark blue field, silver lilies on a red field, and a colorful depiction of St. Nicholas.

In 1848, the Bielsko city council passed a resolution to remove the figure of St. Nicholas, the city's patron, from the coat of arms. The resulting city seals, including those of the city council (35 mm) and the mayor (33 mm), only feature the escutcheon with highly curved shapes, adorned with a flower at the top and two branches at the bottom. At the same time, seals without any coat of arms began to appear. In the 1869 municipal statute granted to Bielsko by Emperor Franz Joseph I of Austria, there is no mention of the coat of arms, signaling that the city's coat of arms had lost its original significance.

At the same time, in the second half of the 19th century, the first heraldic works on the coat of arms of Bielsko began to appear, which presented various, often ahistorical and inconsistent versions of the coat of arms. In the 1864 Stadtwappen der Österreichischen Kaiserstädte by V. R. Widimski, a completely irregular escutcheon is shown, with an eagle (referred to by the author as "Polish") on a blue field. The eagle is silver, with its head turned, a red tongue, golden beak and claws, and a golden crescent with half a cross, ending in a cloverleaf on the wing. H. Saurma von Jeltsch, in Wappenbuch der Schlesischen Städte und Stadtteile (1870), provides a more accurate representation of the coat of arms of Bielsko, showing a half-golden "Upper Silesian" eagle on a blue field and three silver lilies on a red field, but with a tilted head and a Gothic-style cartouche. In J. Siebmacher's Großes und Allgemeines Wappenbuch from 1885, the eagle from Widimski's work can be seen, referred to as "Polish", but without the cross on the chest, with a golden tongue, and featuring the figure of St. Nicholas.

The most faithful heraldic depiction comes from H. G. Ströhl's Stadtwappen von Österreich-Ungarn (1904) – a yellow "Upper Silesian" eagle in a Renaissance style, with a tilted head, red beak, tongue, and claws, closely resembling the version from the time of Casimir II (late 15th century). The conflicting depictions of the coat of arms in the works of heraldists caused additional confusion, as municipal authorities also used various incorrect versions.

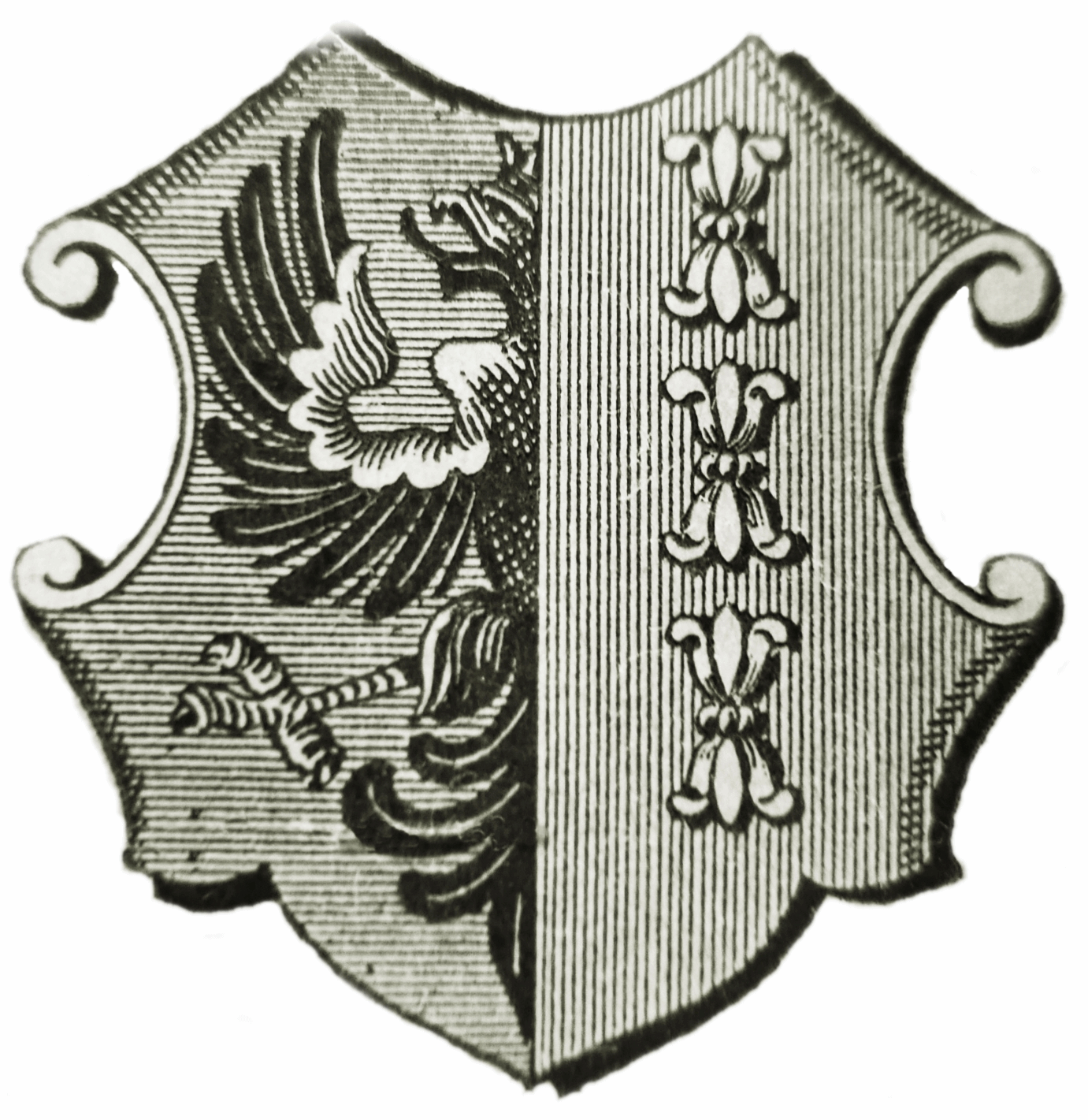
Coat of arms of Bielsko on the mayor's stationery

Around 1900, on the mayor's stationery of Bielsko, another version of the black eagle appeared – with a tilted head, a silver crescent, and a cross on its chest (still on a blue field). This version, clearly referencing the coat of arms of the Prussian Province of Silesia and the coat of arms of Silesia, remained in use until 1923. At that time, the Polish provincial authorities (the city council was dominated by the German population) led to the restoration of the golden eagle (in order to "shed the imperial and German influence").

In 1936, in line with the widespread trend in interwar Poland to clarify municipal coats of arms, explain their origins, and provide them with legal protection, heraldic research on the history and symbolism of the Bielsko coat of arms was initiated, primarily by Professor Marian Gumowski. His findings remain one of the most important works on this subject to this day, despite numerous errors, such as the thesis regarding the existence of the coat of arms at the turn of the 13th and 14th centuries. The history of the Bielsko coat of arms was also explored by R. Wagner, whose work was published in Das Buch der Bielitz-Bialaer Chronika in 1938.

After 1944, the communist authorities in Poland eliminated the coat of arms from municipal seals, replacing it with the national emblem. However, between 1945 and 1950, the pre-war "German" seal from the 1920s, depicting the black eagle with a crescent, was sporadically used in official activities. Official documents and stationery featured the coat of arms approved in 1936.

=== Coat of arms of Biała Krakowska ===
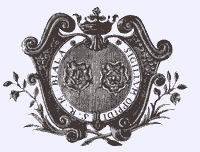
Coat of arms from the founding document

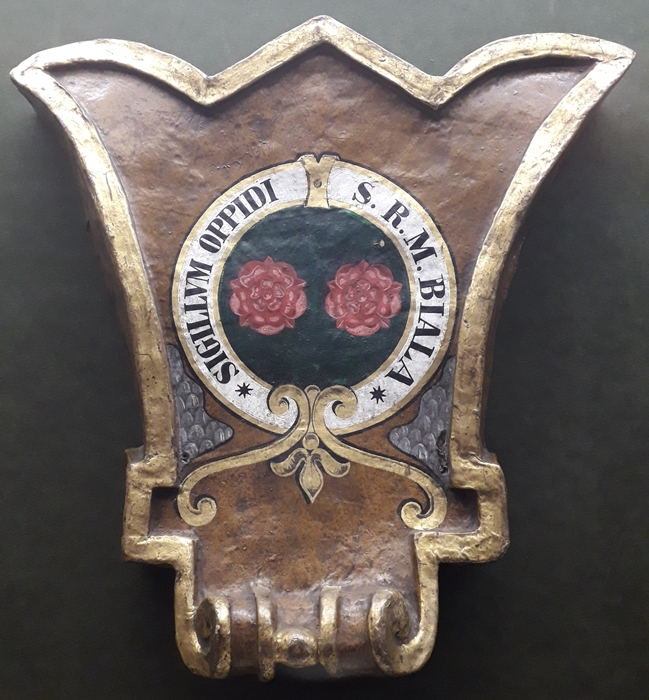
Heraldic cartouche of Biała (18th/19th century)

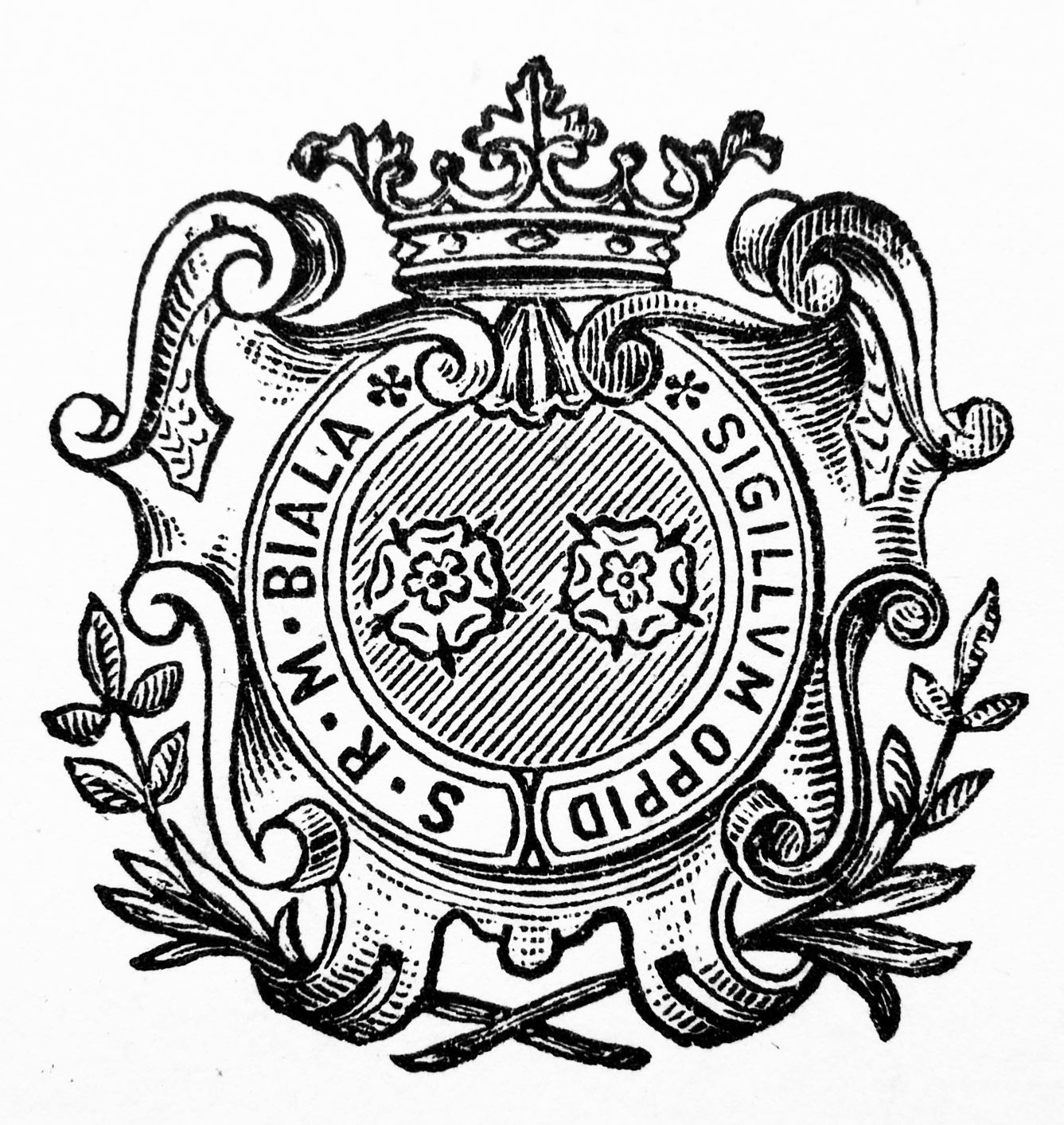
Coat of arms from the paper of the Municipal Savings Bank of Biała (1914)

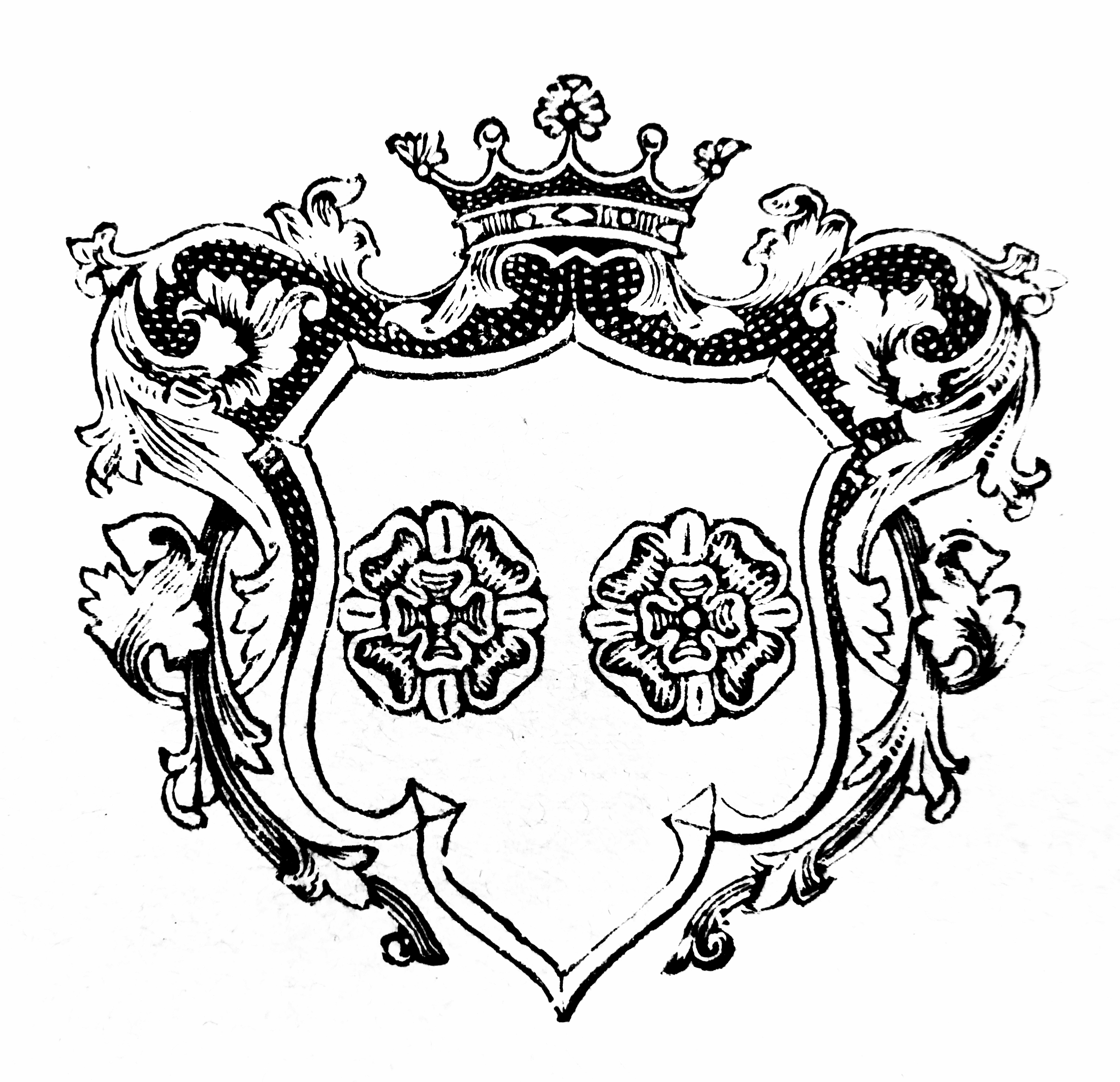
Coat of arms of Biała from the certificate of membership (1914)

The town of Biała was founded at the end of the 16th century as a settlement of Lipnik. Since 1615, it had been a separate town, receiving municipal rights on 9 January 1723. The town's founding privilege granted many rights, including the right to a coat of arms: "(...) The public good will be a permanent coat of arms, as shown below. The administration of the town will use it for sealing letters and official activities". The original document contains a small, colorful drawing of the coat of arms.

A distinctive feature of Biała's coat of arms was the lack of a escutcheon, replaced by the inscription "SIGILLUM OPPIDI S.R.M. BIALA", placed on a stylized baroque cartouche with volutes, branches at the bottom, and a five-petaled, stylized crown at the top. This shape was similar to the shape of municipal seals and was popular in European heraldry from the 16th century. The coat of arms features two red, five-petaled roses with an equal number of smaller petals in the center. The large petals of the roses are separated by small tongues.

The origin of the rose motif remains unclear, as it does not seem to be related to the history of the town. It might have been borrowed from the Wettin family coat of arms or from one of the noble coats of arms popular in Mazovia, from where the starosta Jakub Zygmunt Rybiński came, who petitioned Augustus II the Strong for the grant of municipal rights. The use of the rose motif could also be explained by the popularity of flowers in Baroque art and Christian symbolism.

A preserved relic from the first half of the 18th century is a paper cartouche, likely from the former town hall. This version is almost identical to the one in the founding document but lacks the crown. The 18th-century version of Biała's symbol is also known from municipal seals: the large one made in 1723 (diameter 31 mm) and the small one with a simplified design (four-petaled roses with geometric forms and long, thin tongues between them, and a crown with three leafy prongs).

New municipal seals were created in 1789, when Biała became a free imperial city with a first-class magistrate. The so-called great seal features a baroque cartouche richly adorned with flowers, with an oval (vertical) escutcheon in the center with a green chequered field. Two flowers in a diagonal arrangement (from left to right) with eight petals are shown on the field. Above the escutcheon is a large, five-petaled royal crown. This seal marks a departure from the original town coat of arms, both in the geometric arrangement of the roses and their depiction, which was often stylized to resemble other flowers. The crown in the coat of arms referred to the title of the Austrian emperors as kings of Galicia and Lodomeria, as well as the Grand Duchy of Kraków and the Duchy of Oświęcim and Zator. A version closer to the original was used on the smaller seal (two five-petaled flowers placed horizontally). A slightly different version of the coat of arms appeared on the first Catholic parish seal – a cartouche with a horizontal oval escutcheon with a green chequered field and under the royal crown, with two five-petaled roses on the field.

In the mid-19th century, significant modifications to the coat of arms of Biała began to appear, departing greatly from the traditional design. The emblem featured on the industrial exhibition diploma from 1871 displayed blue roses with four petals, arranged diagonally from right to left. In newspaper vignettes, the coat of arms was depicted with two four-petaled flowers arranged in a column. By the end of the century, an oval seal of the Biała magistrate featured an ornamental cartouche with a five-leaf crown and an oval, green-shaded escutcheon, which contained two six-petaled flowers arranged horizontally in the center. Additionally, seal stickers from the turn of the 19th and 20th centuries, used by the municipality and the Biała magistrate, depicted oval escutcheons with two horizontally placed roses, surrounded by two small stars, within ornate cartouches crowned with a royal crown. The correct (18th-century) version of the coat of arms was still used on the letterhead of the magistrate, community certificates, and both the large (36 mm) and small (33 mm) municipal seals.

By the end of the 19th century, stylized, entirely ahistorical coats of arms began to appear on many buildings in the city. In gothic escutcheons, an oblique band was placed, featuring two or three rosettes or semicircles representing the roses. Even among the rich decorations of the interior of the Biała town hall, no coats of arms were used – only round escutcheons with an oblique, empty band.

At the turn of the 19th and 20th centuries, Biała's coat of arms attracted much less attention from heraldists compared to the symbol of neighboring Bielsko. It was completely omitted from the works of V. R. Widimsky and H. Saurma von Jeltsch. In J. Siebmacher's Großes und Allgemeines Wappenbuch from 1885, the coat of arms was presented as follows: on a green, distorted decorative escutcheon, two silver flowers with geometric shapes arranged diagonally (from left to right). A much more accurate version was published by H. G. Ströhl in Städte-Wappen von Österreich-Ungarn – a modern French escutcheon with two five-petaled roses, reproduced from the founding document, arranged horizontally on a light green field, with five short golden tongues between the petals and a golden dish.

In 1918, the city (renamed Biała Krakowska in 1925) became part of Poland. The new authorities did not discontinue the use of the royal free city title, which can be seen in the magistrate's seal from the 1920s. This seal features an ornamental cartouche with a five-petaled crown and an oval city coat of arms – two flowers arranged horizontally on a green-shaded field. The same version was used on seals in 1928 and 1939. During the interwar period, there were also depictions of the city coat of arms that returned to the original from 1723 (widely disseminated through the publication Biala eine deutsche Stadt in Galizien. Geographische Untersuchung des Stadtproblems by Erwin Hanslik in 1909), often with modifications such as yellow tongues between the flower petals or a silver background for the roses.

In contrast to Bielsko, during the interwar period, no official research or discussions were conducted regarding the coat of arms of Biała, and it was not approved by the Ministry of the Interior and Administration.

After 1944, the communist authorities of Poland removed the coat of arms from municipal seals, replacing it with the state emblem. However, between 1945 and 1950, both the magistrate and municipal government seals from the interwar period were sporadically used in official procedures. The coat of arms from these seals was used on official documents and letterhead.

=== Coat of arms of Bielsko-Biała ===
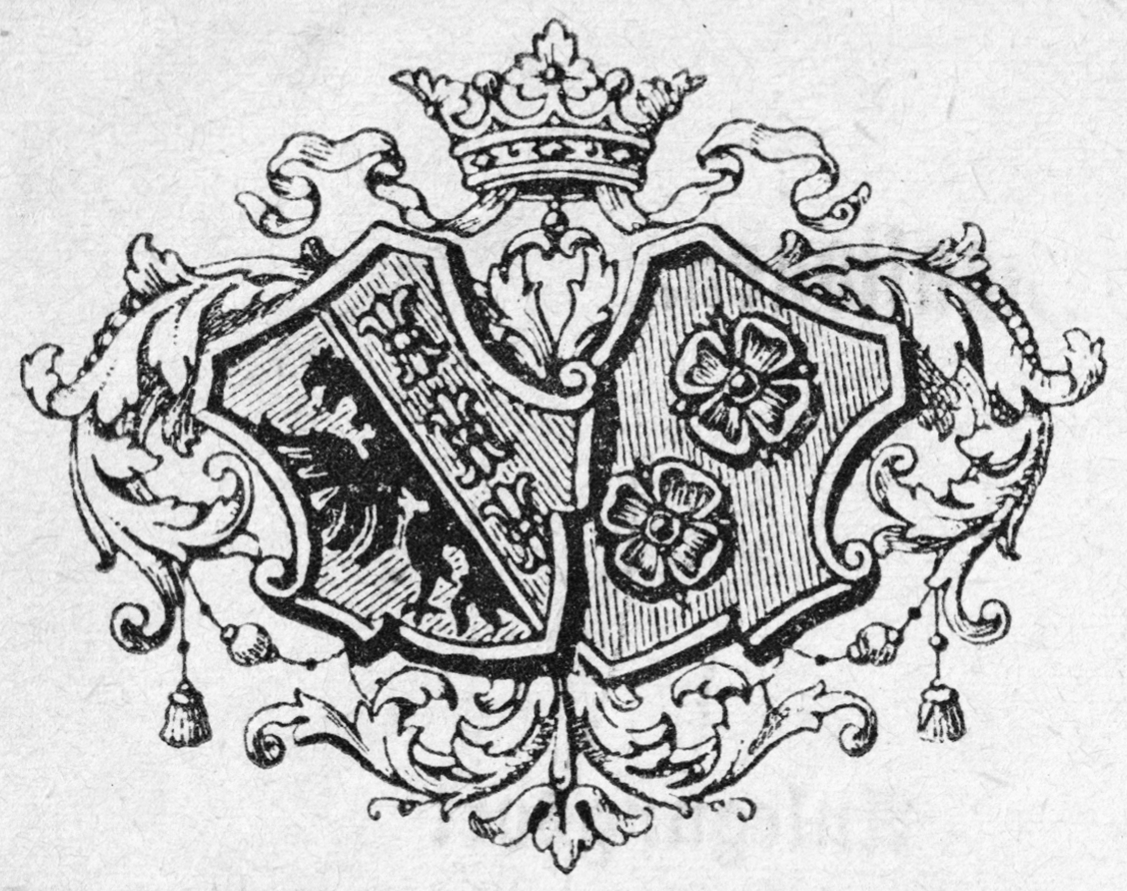
Combined coats of arms of Bielsko and Biała from the Unsere Heimat magazine, edited by R.E. Wagner in 1935

Although Bielsko and Biała were administratively separate and belonged to different administrative units, since the mid-19th century, they formed a unified entity in many respects. Primarily, this unity was evident in terms of economic and socio-cultural ties. On various occasions, the need for a shared symbol arose. The diploma for the industrial exhibition organized by both cities in 1871 and pre-war guides and other works (e.g., Das Buch der Bielitz-Bialaer Chronika by R. Wagner) featured an experimental form combining both coats of arms on a single cartouche, under a shared five-petaled royal crown. However, more commonly, as in Stadte-Wappen von Österreich-Ungarn by H.G. Ströhl, the coats of arms were placed next to each other, sometimes using standardized escutcheons (often ornate, deformed, or rarely Gothic, Spanish, or modern French styles).

During the Polish People's Republic, city coats of arms were seen as symbols of feudalism, and their use was limited, mainly serving as a representational sign and a mark of a town's distinctiveness. After the merger of Bielsko and Biała into a single entity, no official city coat of arms was established. More often than not, the two escutcheons were placed side by side, adopting Gothic, Spanish, or modern French shapes. Modifications to the shape and historically unfounded color changes were also common. In 1959, the Kronika Beskidzka, then the Polish United Workers' Party organ, wrote: "Today, we're not sure what to do with this coat of arms. It's there, but it isn't".

In the 1950s, there was a tendency to represent the merged cities solely through the older coat of arms of Bielsko. This view was supported by the recognized academic authority, Marian Gumowski, and was accepted by authors of works like Wielka Encyklopedia Powszechna PWN and Miasta polskie w Tysiącleciu (1966).

The lack of a standard model led to random and often incorrect representations of the city's coat of arms. During the 700th anniversary celebrations of the city in 1963, hundreds of coats of arms were printed and painted, featuring a "German" eagle with a crescent on its chest, world scout emblems instead of the lilies from the Wrocław bishops' coat of arms, and simplified, geometric forms of roses. Several different versions of the coat of arms were used on official documents.

After 1970, the left escutcheon (Bielsko's coat of arms) was most often shown in the 1904 version by H.G. Ströhl or the version approved by the Ministry of Internal Affairs in 1936. As a result, the eagle sometimes had a straight head, sometimes tilted toward its wing. On the right escutcheon, two flowers resembling roses were arranged diagonally, often with white-silver borders or, in the Ströhl version, with yellow tongues between the petals.

In the 1980s, there were also highly controversial attempts to merge both coats of arms into one, replacing the three white lilies on a red field with red roses on a green field. This version did not gain acceptance, and the double coat of arms was quickly reinstated.

On 17 December 1992, the Bielsko-Biała City Council, based on the 1990 Act on Local Government, passed Resolution No. 37/366/92 regarding the city's coat of arms. The official coat of arms was designed by Zbigniew Różewicz. With the introduction of Gothic escutcheons, it returned to historical emblems and colors:

In the first, divided escutcheon, the right field is blue with a yellow half-eagle facing right, without a crown; in the left red field, there are three white heraldic lilies arranged vertically. In the second escutcheon, on a green field, there are two red roses arranged horizontally.
