= Bielsko-Biała Museum and Castle =

Museum and castle in Silesia, Poland

Coordinates: 49°49′19″N 19°2′40″E

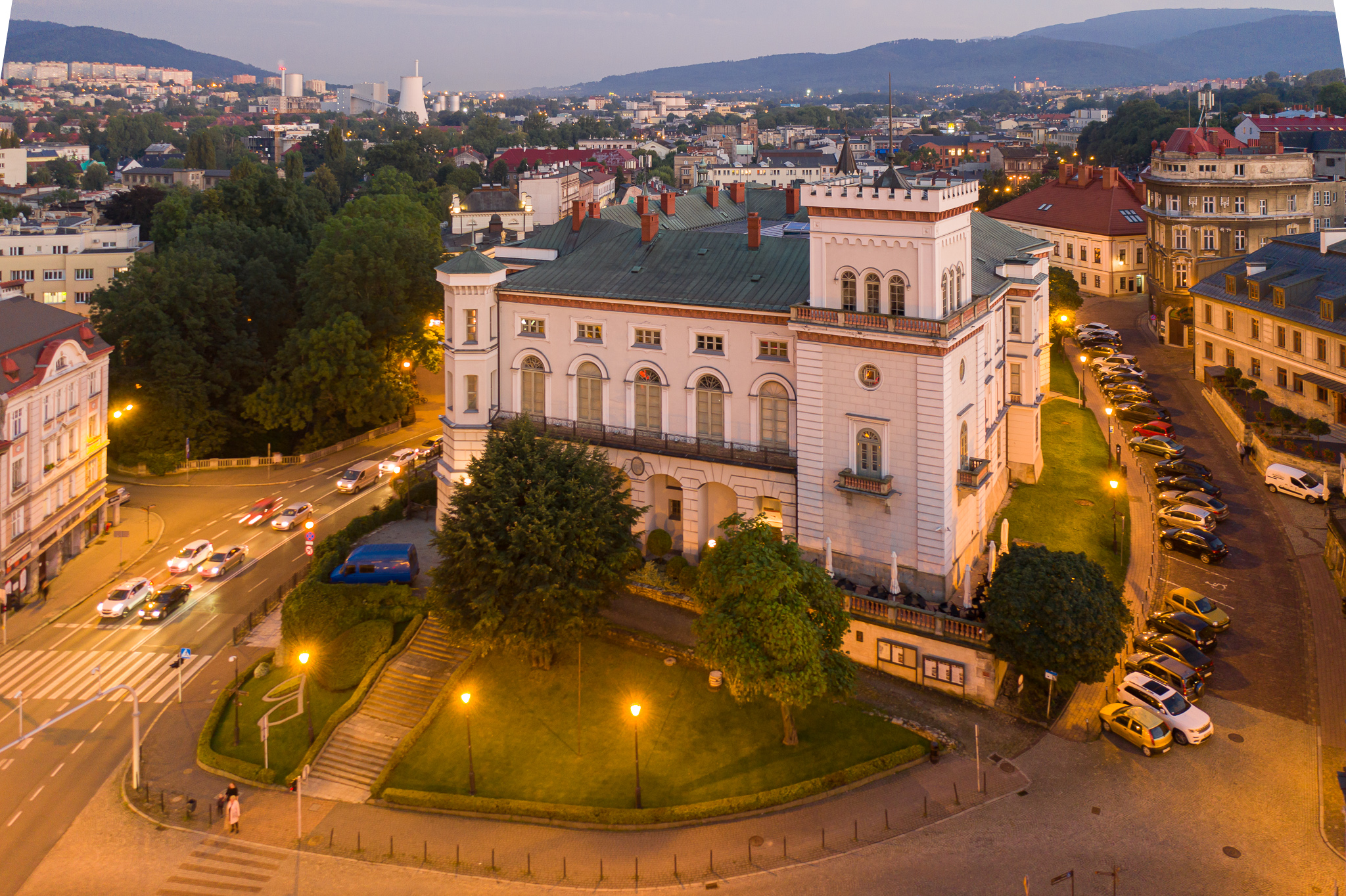
The Castle in Bielsko-Biała, Poland

The Bielsko-Biała Museum, also known as the Castle of the Sułkowski Princes (Polish: Zamek książąt Sułkowskich) is a museum for the city of Bielsko-Biała, Poland located in the historical Bielsko Castle. Three local branches of the museum have been established since the 1970s: the Julian Fałat Museum, the Museum of Technology and Textile Industry, and the Weaver's House Museum.

== History of the Museum ==
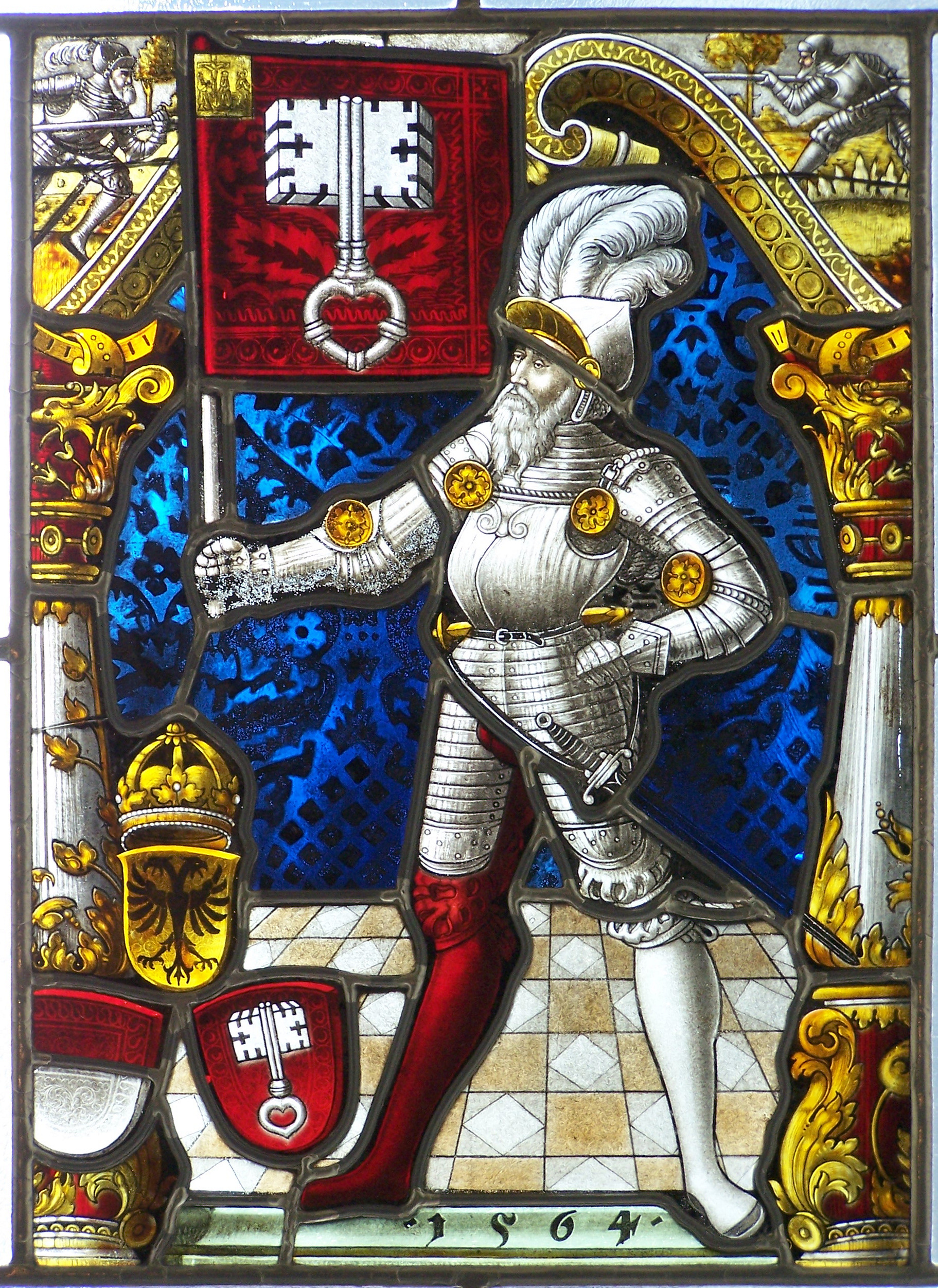
A historic stained-glass window with heraldic symbols inside the castle

The Bielsko-Biała Museum, with its main location in the historical Bielsko Castle has maintained museum traditions conceived at the beginning of the 20th century, when the local government of Silesian Bielsko and Galician Biała founded two separate museums. The older Biała Municipal Museum was set up upon the initiative of Bielsko Gymnasium (lower secondary school) teacher Erwin Hanslik by virtue of the City Council Resolution of 19 December 1902. At the same time, in a forum of the City Council of neighbouring Bielsko, similar initiative was taken by Arthur Schmidt, a protestant vicar of that town. In the months that followed, by his application, in 1903 there was undertaken in Bielsko and its surroundings a splendid action of collecting artefacts of museum-value. Its outcome was shown in June 1903 at Bielsko Shooting Gallery at a display of local antiquities. A few months later Bielsko City Council called into being Municipal Museum in Bielsko. Some time passed, however, before both museum opened to the public.

The Biała Museum was opened on 3 December 1904 in the City Hall, where it functioned until 1920. Then the activities of the Museum were suspended, its exhibits stored in one room and the facility changed its purpose. It was not until 1932 that the Museum was reopened, this time in the basement of the building, where it functioned until the outbreak of World War II when the Museum closed down. The Bielsko Museum was opened to the general public on 25 February 1906 in the building of Old Town Hall at 9 Rynek, where it operated without a closure until 1941. During the inter-war period, thanks to the endeavours of its curator, Edward Schnack, the exposition significantly grew in number. At that time it was one of the largest regional museums in Poland and the third in Silesia, preceded by those functioning in Katowice and Cieszyn. In 1941, the Nazi authorities joined the two municipal museums in the so-called Heimatmuseum, which was housed in Biała in the former guild house. There it survived until the end of World War II. In 1945 a decision was passed to revive the museum. The Municipal Museum in Bielsko opened to the public on 14 February 1947. Since the 1970s, several local branches have been established: the Julian Fałat Museum (1973), The "Museum of Textile Technology" – at present the Museum of Technology and Textile Industry (1979) and the Weaver's House Museum (1992). Since 2001 the museum has been called the Bielsko-Biała Museum and since 2013 the Bielsko-Biała Historical Museum.

== The Castle ==
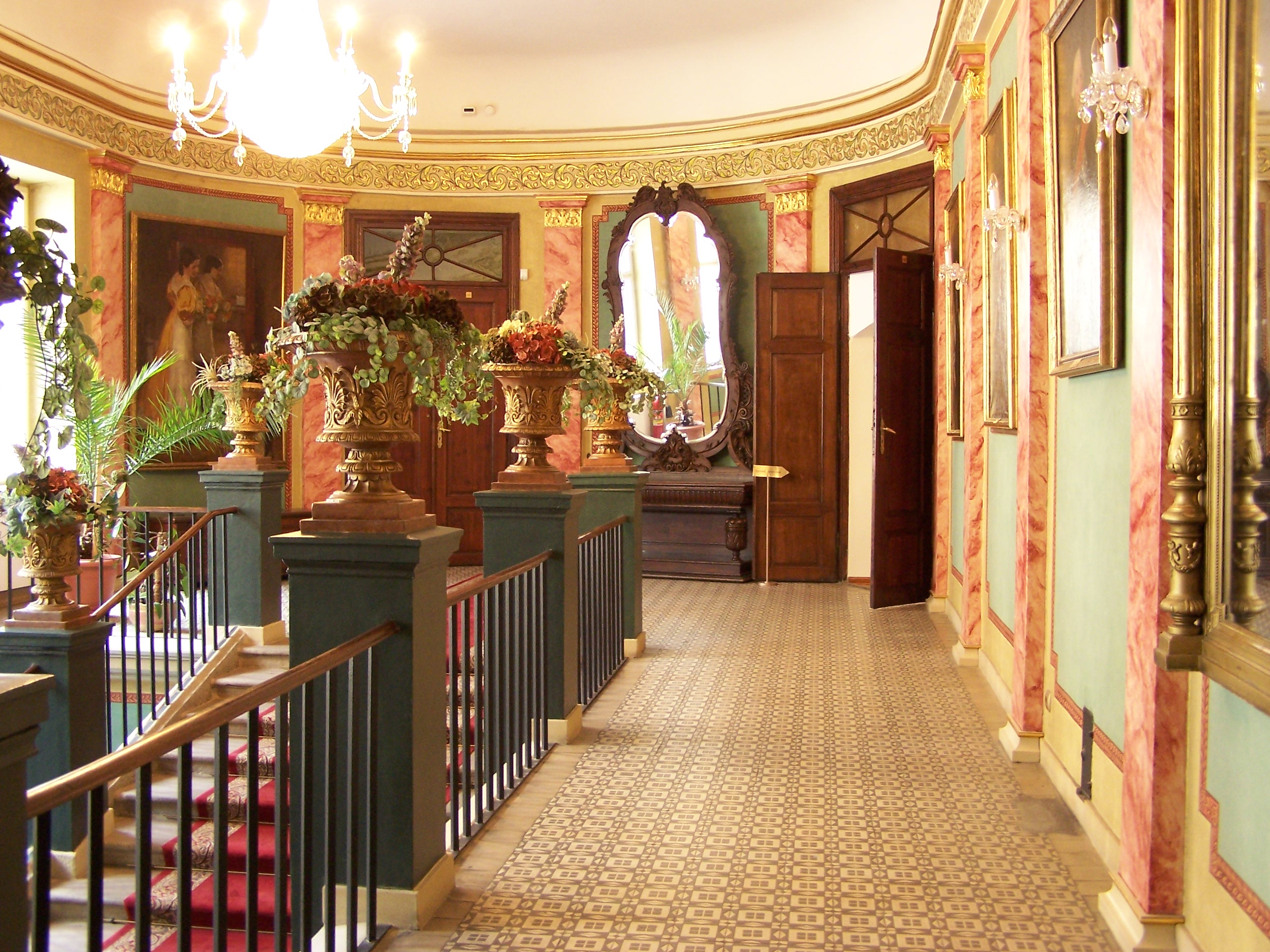
A staircase in the castle

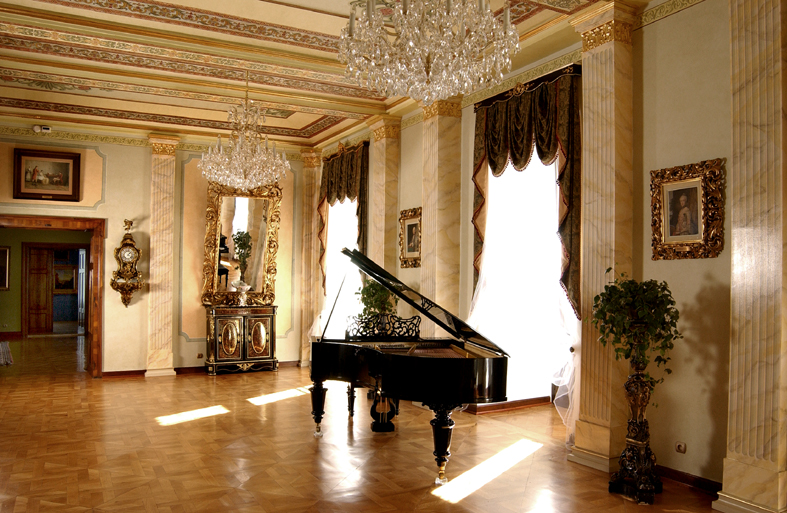
The Music Hall

Towering in the Bielsko-Biała city centre, the Castle is the oldest and largest construction of historical importance, erected in the old town of Bielsko. A legend says that in its place there used to be a settlement of robbers who attacked travelling merchants. The Opole Prince, Casimir (1229/30) of the Piasts is said to have conquered that fortalice, wiped out the robbers and had the hunting palace erected in that place, which over the years grew into a magnificent castle around which the city of Bielsko developed. The oldest part of the Castle dates back to the 14th century. Over the next centuries the Castle gradually developed and transformed. It is a city castle in its nature, incorporated into the system of Bielsko fortifications from the beginning, at the same time providing their strongest section. Over the centuries it performed the function of a Silesian border-stronghold, first guarding the borders of Cieszyn and Oświęcim district duchies and then in the second half of the 15th century it protected the Czech and Polish state border and from 1526 - the Austrian-Polish border. Starting from the close of the 16th century, its defensive role was declining and the Castle gradually transformed into a nobleman's mansion. The present appearance of the castle dates back to the last, thorough reconstruction undertaken in the second half of the 19th century, which entirely wiped out its previous characteristics of style. During the years 1899-1973, in place of brick breast wall presently seen on the east part of the Castle, there used to be a parade of bazaars, constituting an attractive architectural foundation for the body of the Castle. The bazaars were pulled down in connection with widening of Zamkowa Street. The Castle erected by Piasts ruling over the Cieszyn Dutchy was one of their residences for over two centuries. From 1572 it was the administrative and commercial centre of the independent class-based Bielsko state, governed by representatives of nobleman's families of the Promnitzes, Schaffgotsches, Sunneghs, Solmses and Haugwitzes. In 1752, the position of that state was raised to the position of duchies which went into the rule of the Sułkowskis family. The Bielsko Dutchy existed until 1849, when Austria introduced modern administrative division, thus doing away with old feudal structures and was incorporated into Bielsko District Starosty. The Castle itself and numerous estates in the vicinity of the city remained in the possession of the Sułkowskis until 1945. After World War II the Castle was taken over by the Polish State as the property left by the Germans and was facilitated as the seat of many cultural institutions. Since 1983 the Castle sole usufructary has been the national Museum in Bielsko-Biała, subordinated to Silesian local government in Katowice.

=== Permanent exhibition ===
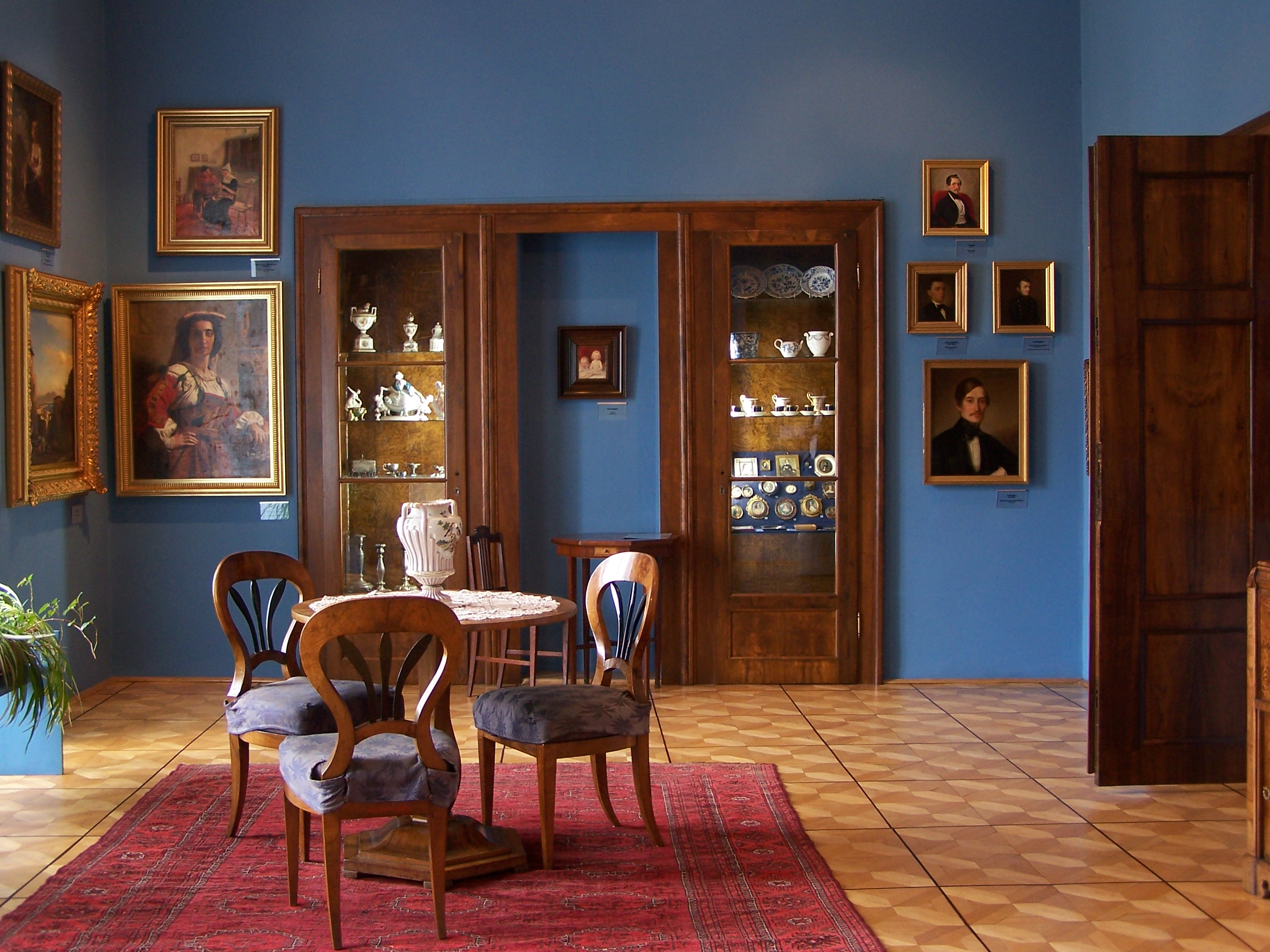
"Blue salon" with art gallery.

The permanent exhibition in the Castle encompasses a number of rooms on the first floor. The accession to it runs along the 19th century vestibule, restored in 2001. In the west wing of the building the hunting room and armoury are located. The next two rooms display three centuries of art history from the 15th to the 17th century. Neighbouring with these rooms are a rococo concert hall and a Biedermeier room. The Castle's east wing contains a gallery of the 19th and 20th century painting and graphic art. Following rooms located in the north wing display an exhibition devoted to the history of the city and Castle, as well as craftsman traditions of old Bielsko and Biała. The east wing of the castle is occupied by art gallery. The 19th paintings displayed here include works of art representing realism and academism, Młoda Polska (Young Poland) paintings, works of artists connected with Bielsko-Biała during the twenty years of independence after World War I and during the modern times. Along the courtyard-facing vestibule there has been displayed a collection of graphic art produced by artists of the early 20th century as well as portraits showing inhabitants of Bielsko and Biała in the 19th and 20th century. Furthermore, on the ground floor of the Castle there are three other rooms housing museum's temporary exhibitions.

== Museum of Technology and Textile Industry ==
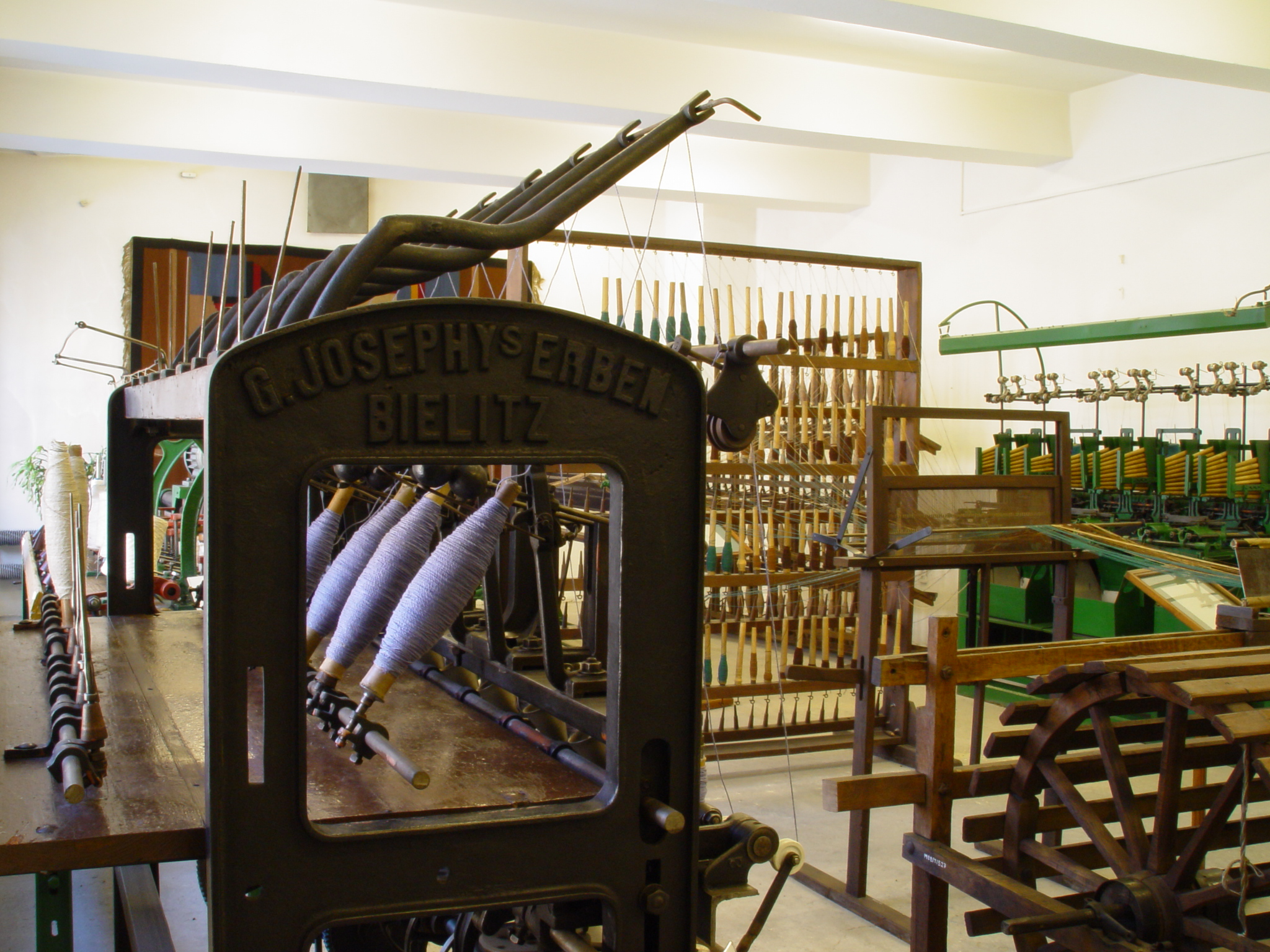
Machines at the preliminary section in the Museum of Technology

The Museum preserves traditions of the wool industry in Bielsko-Biała, by means of collecting machines, equipment and documents related to this field of manufacturing. The exhibits are stored in four rooms. Each of them is commensurate with division of old textile factory – preliminary treatment mill, weaving mill and finishing mill. A separate unit consists of machines for making hats. The display is complemented by exhibition devoted to the history of Bielsko-Biała fire brigade and of municipal water supply system. There is also a little printing office and a so-called museum granary, where all the historical household equipments, radio sets, typewriters etc., are being stored. The historical lathe, drilling machines and locksmith tools remind of the traditions of metal processing industry in Bielsko.

== The Weaver's House ==
Reconstruction of the interior of a weaver's house and workshop owned by a guild master underlies the exhibition housed in the Weaver's House. Its arrangement is an attempt to bring closer the living and working conditions in a house of the turn of the 19th and 20th centuries. A hall splits the house into two major sections – workshop on the left of the entrance and living quarters on the right, with a kitchen and a bedroom. The Weaver's House reveals an original example of the former wooden town housing. It is a unique attempt to show craftsman's work, fully shaped by strong guild's position.

== Julian Fałat's Villa ==
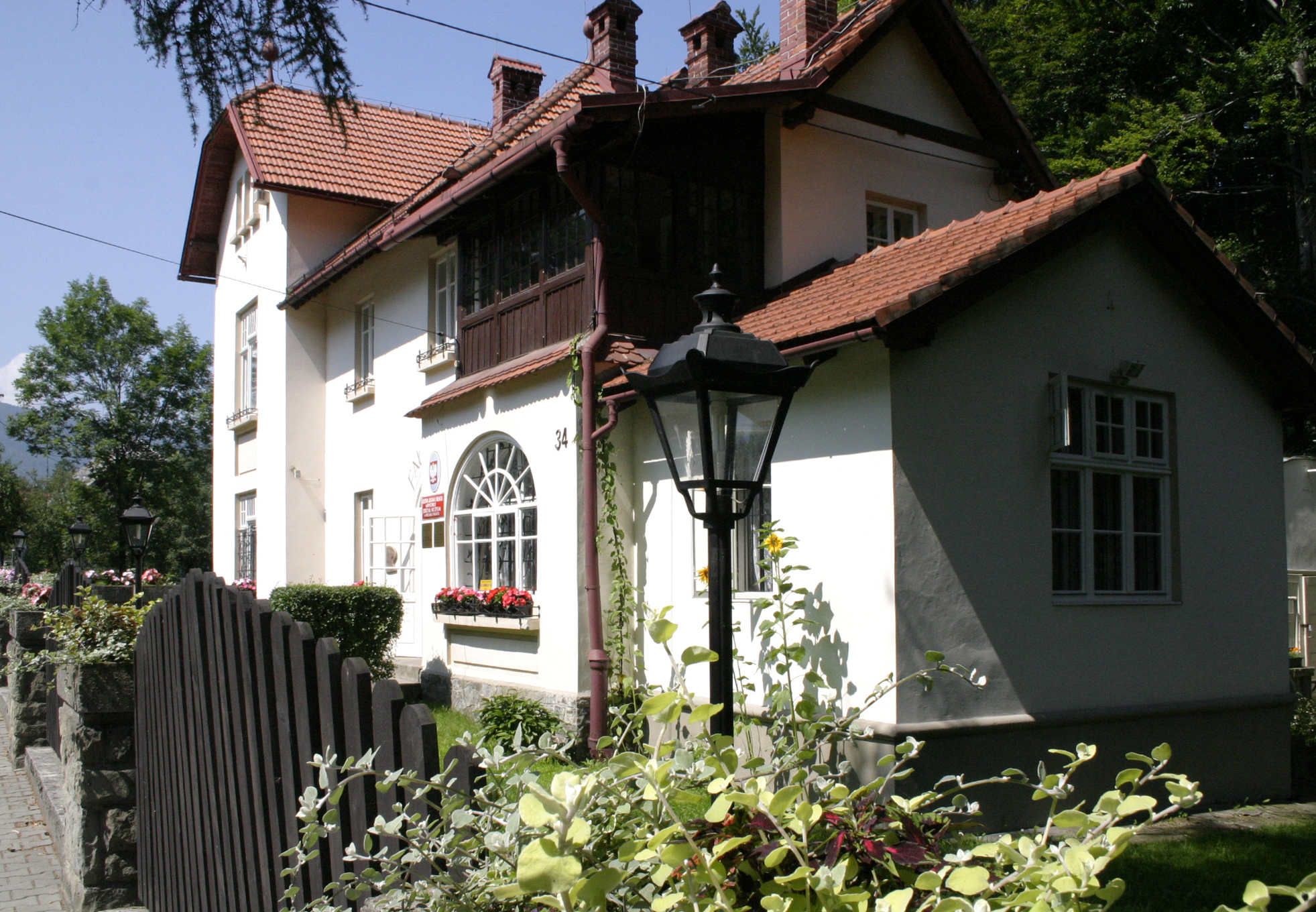
Julian Fałat's Villa

The museum of Julian Fałat in Bystra Śląska is housed in a historical villa of the artist, called “Fałatówka” and its visitors are introduced to the art and some biographical details of the artist. This is the house where the artists lived upon retirement from the position of a rector of the Cracow Academy of Fine Arts. The exhibition presents oil paintings and watercolours: self-portraits, portraits of his family and friends, landscapes from his numerous travels and hunting-related works.

The exhibition is enriched with archival material devoted to the life artistic output and social activities for the benefits of society. Exhibits include School Certificates, photographs of Fałat with his family and friends, diplomas, honorary mentions, distinctions, letters and souvenirs related to his travels around the world.

== Gallery ==
Museum collections

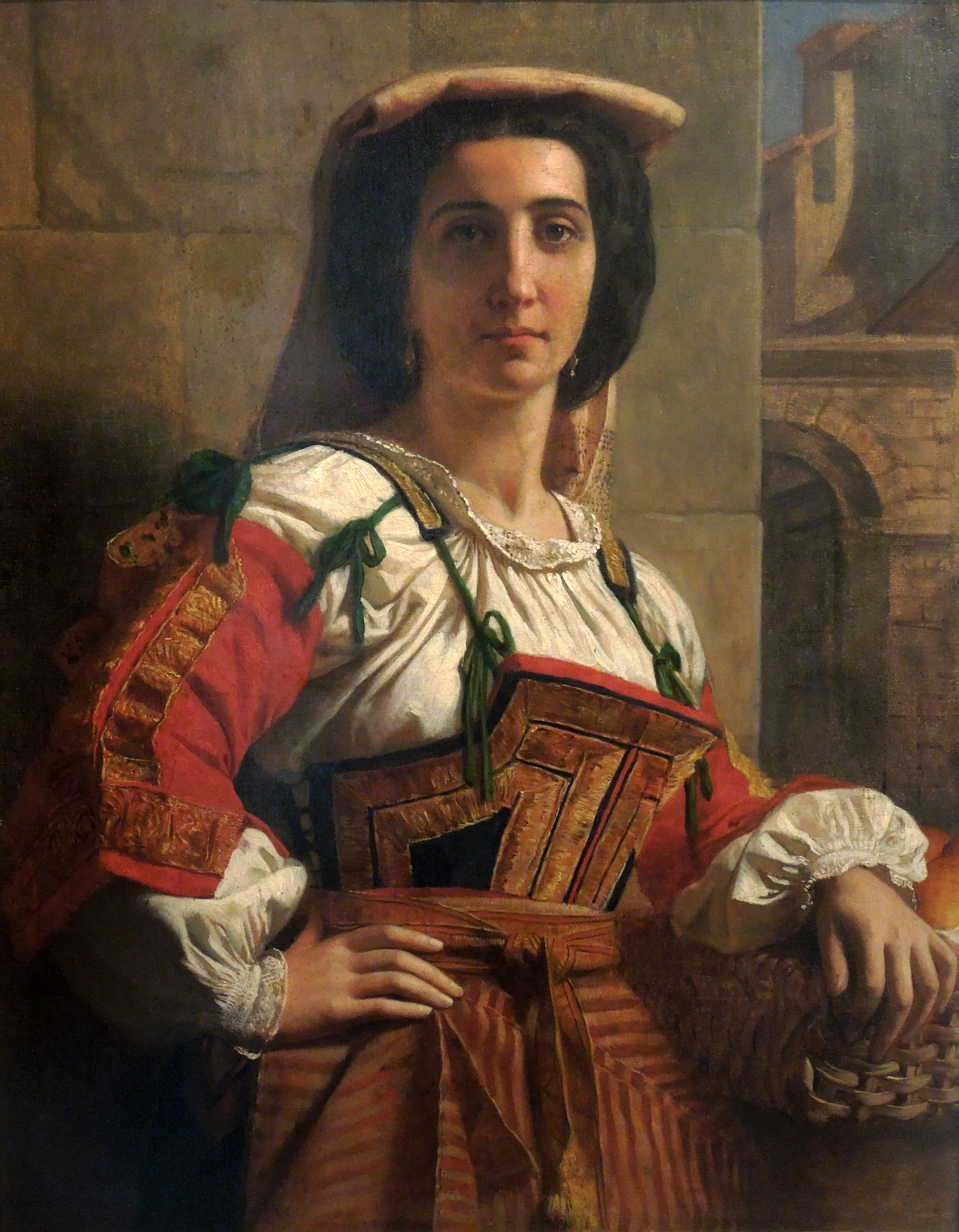
Italian Woman in National Costume, Carl von Blaas, 1880

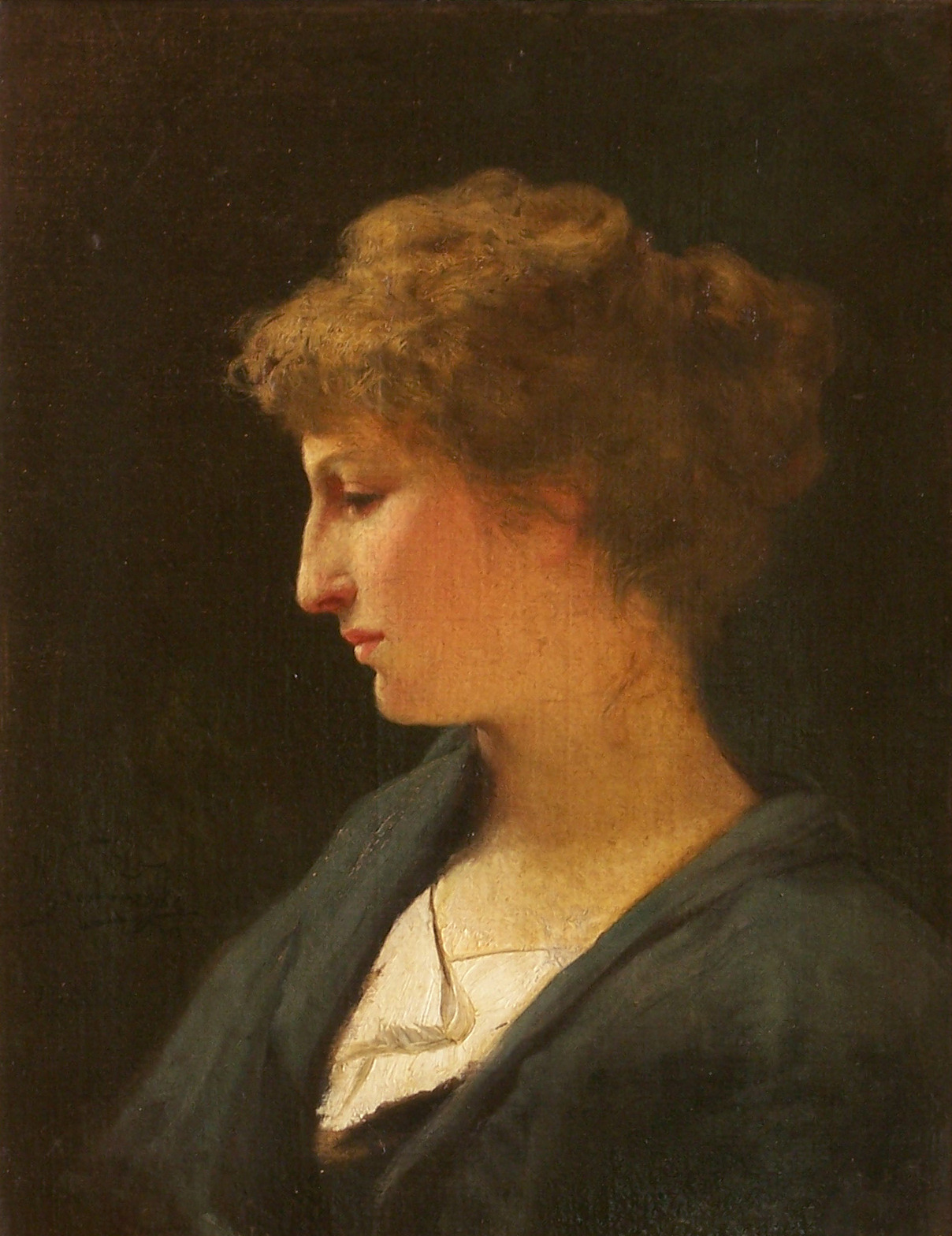
Portrait of a Roman Woman, Henryk Siemiradzki, 1900

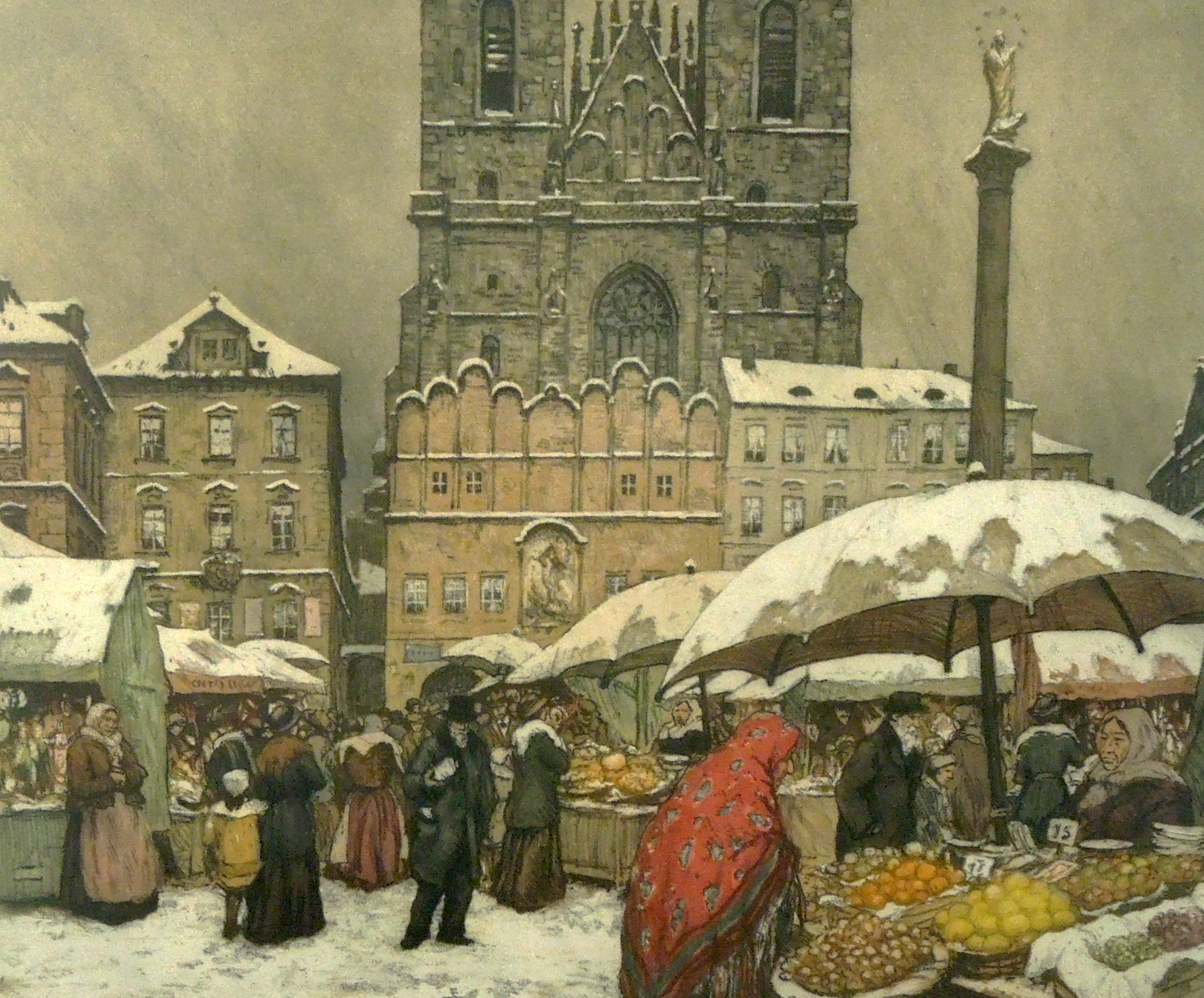
Street Market, František Šimon, ca. 1910

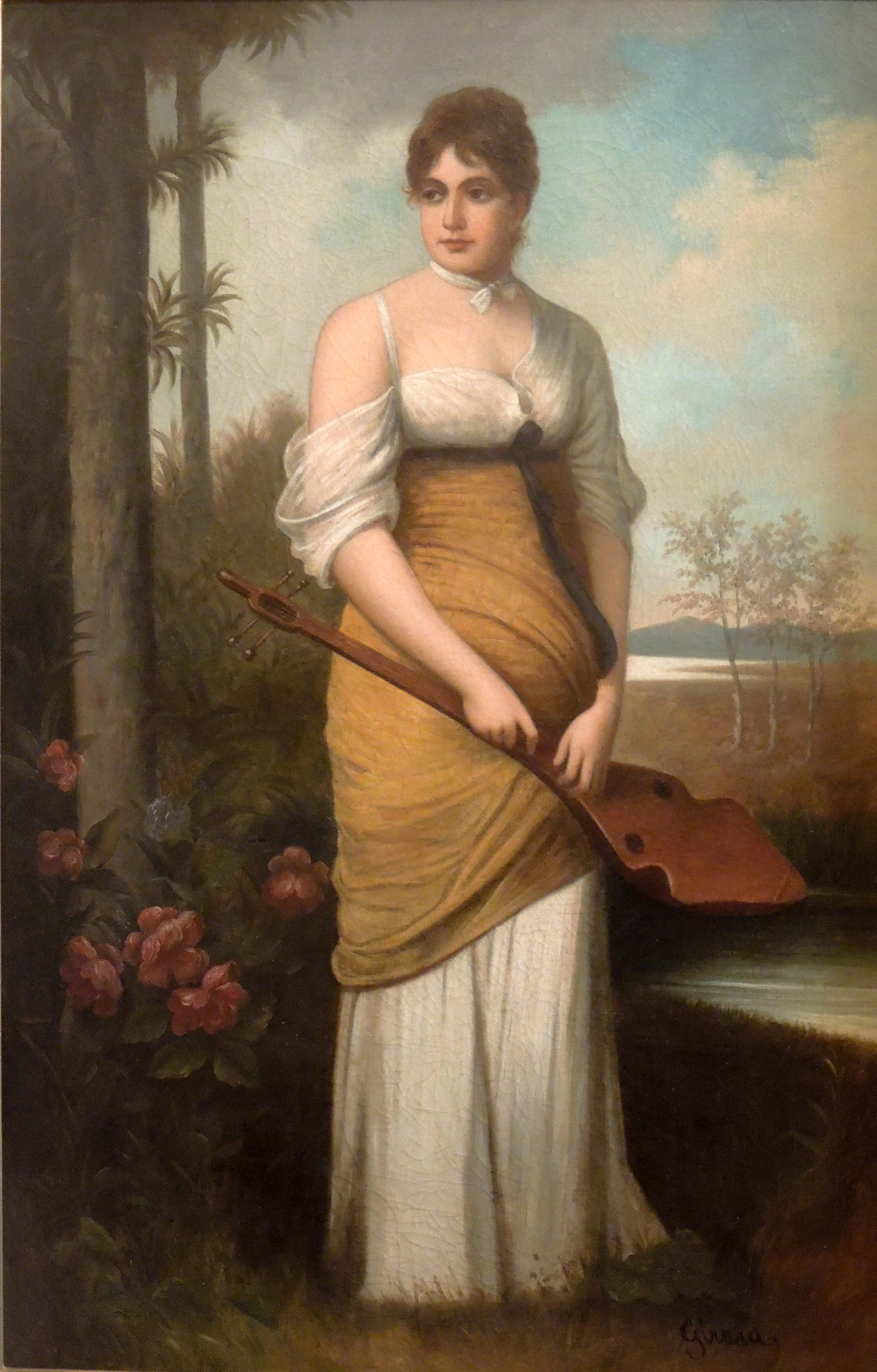
A Woman with a Musical Instrument, Paul-Albert Girard, ca. 1875

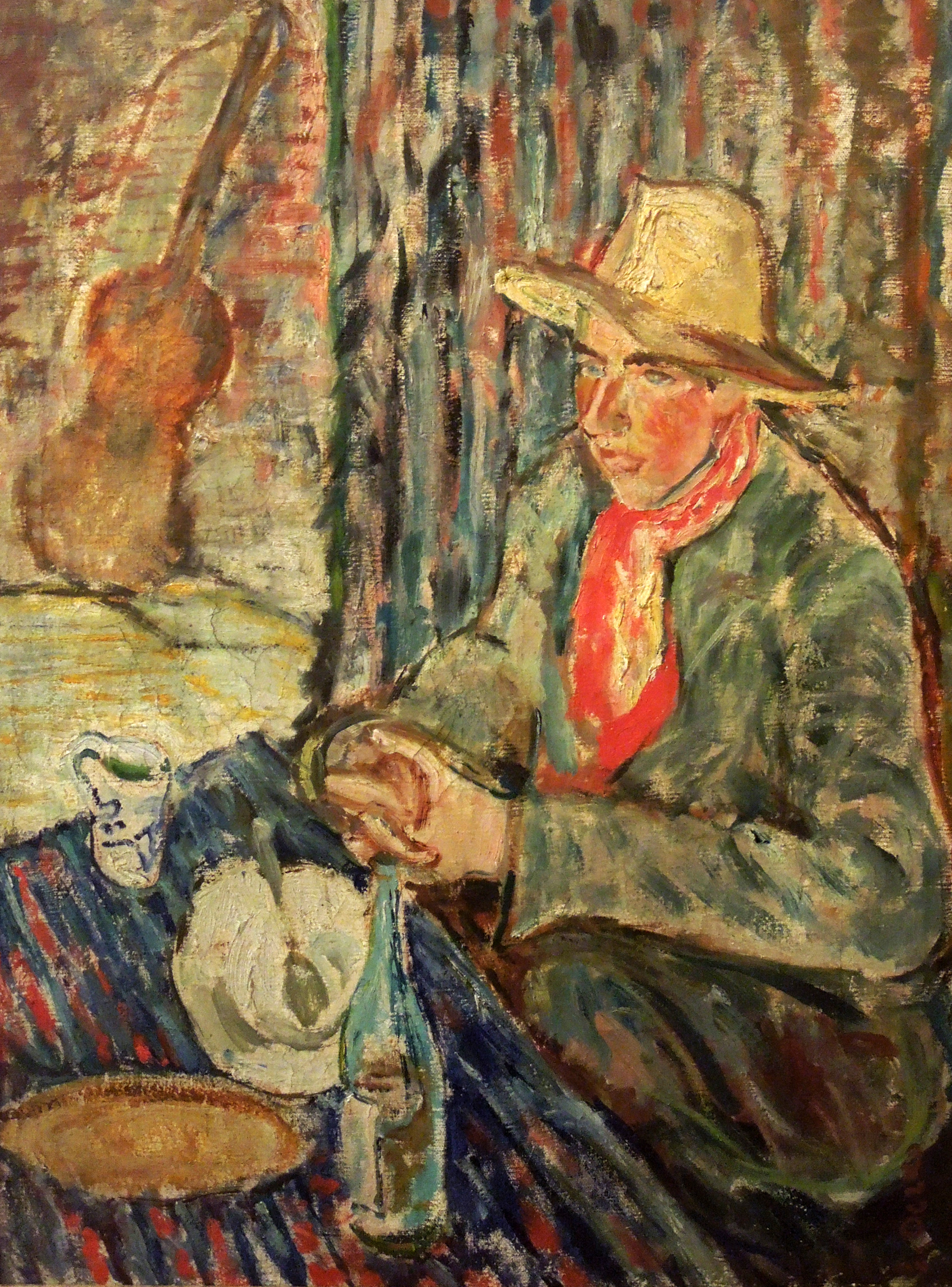
Man Wearing a Red Scarf, Bertold Piotr Oczko, ca. 1935

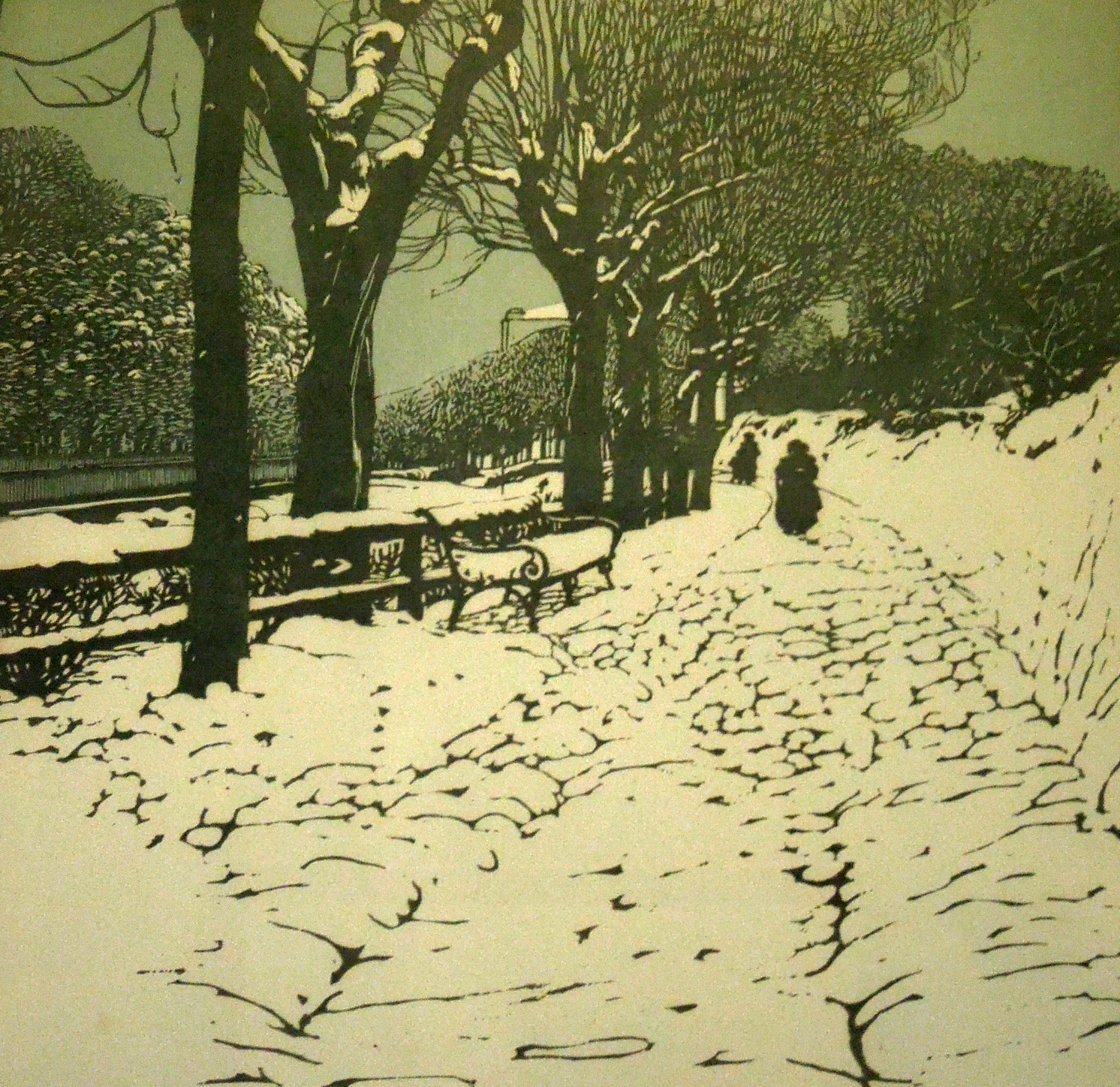
Guard Hill in Vienna, Carl Moll, 1903

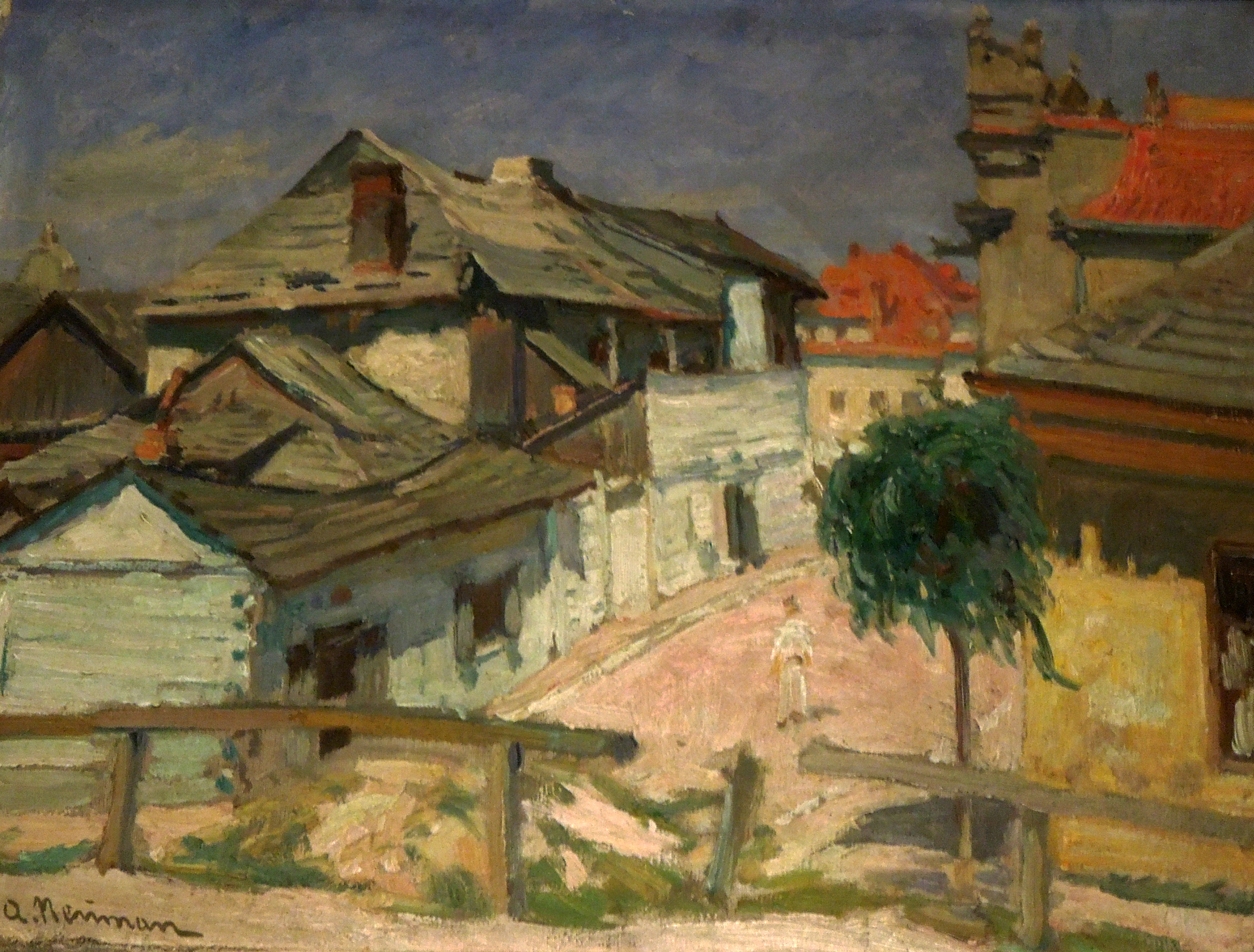
View of a Small Town, Abraham Neumann, ca. 1910

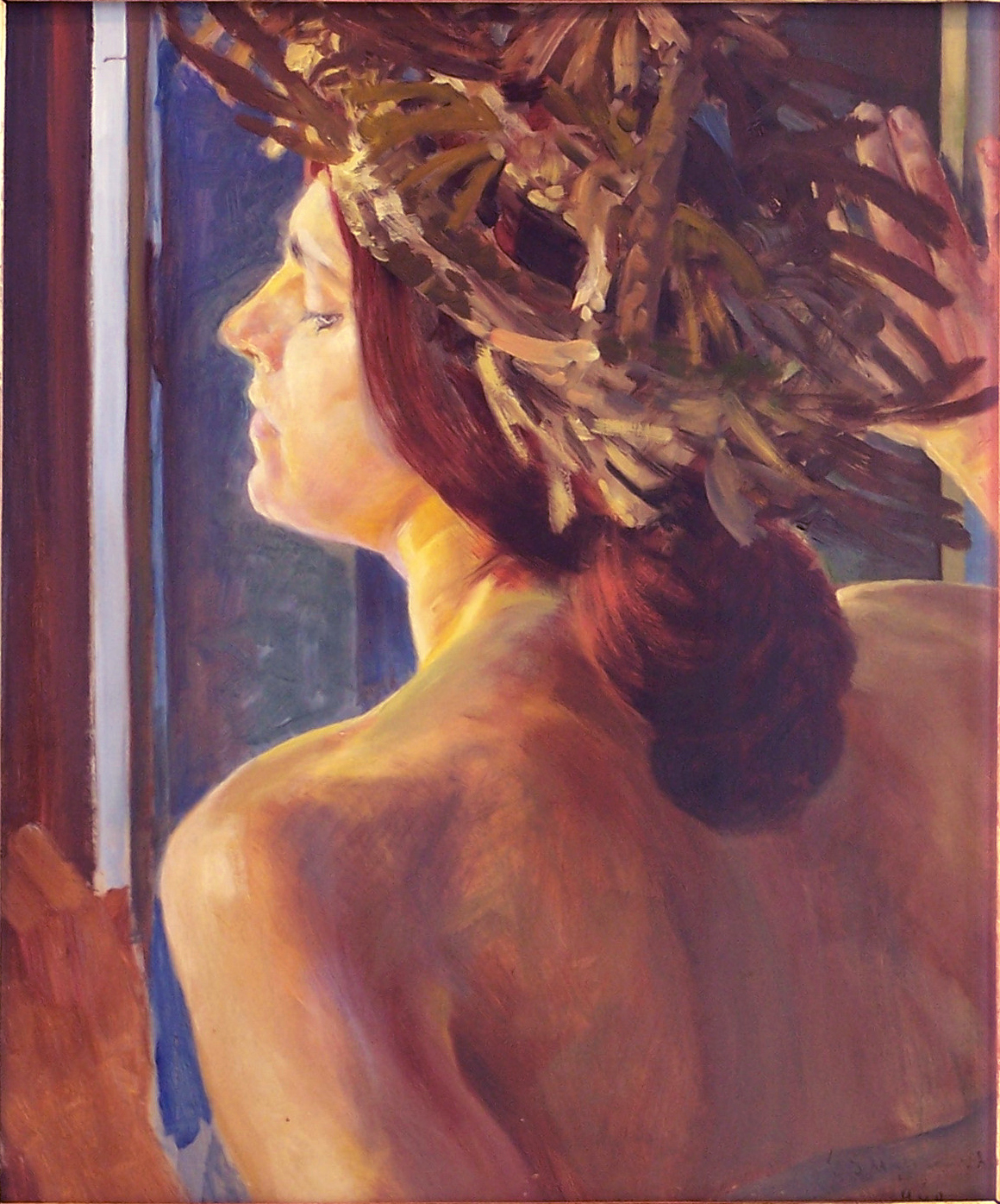
Study of a Woman by the Window, Jacek Malczewski

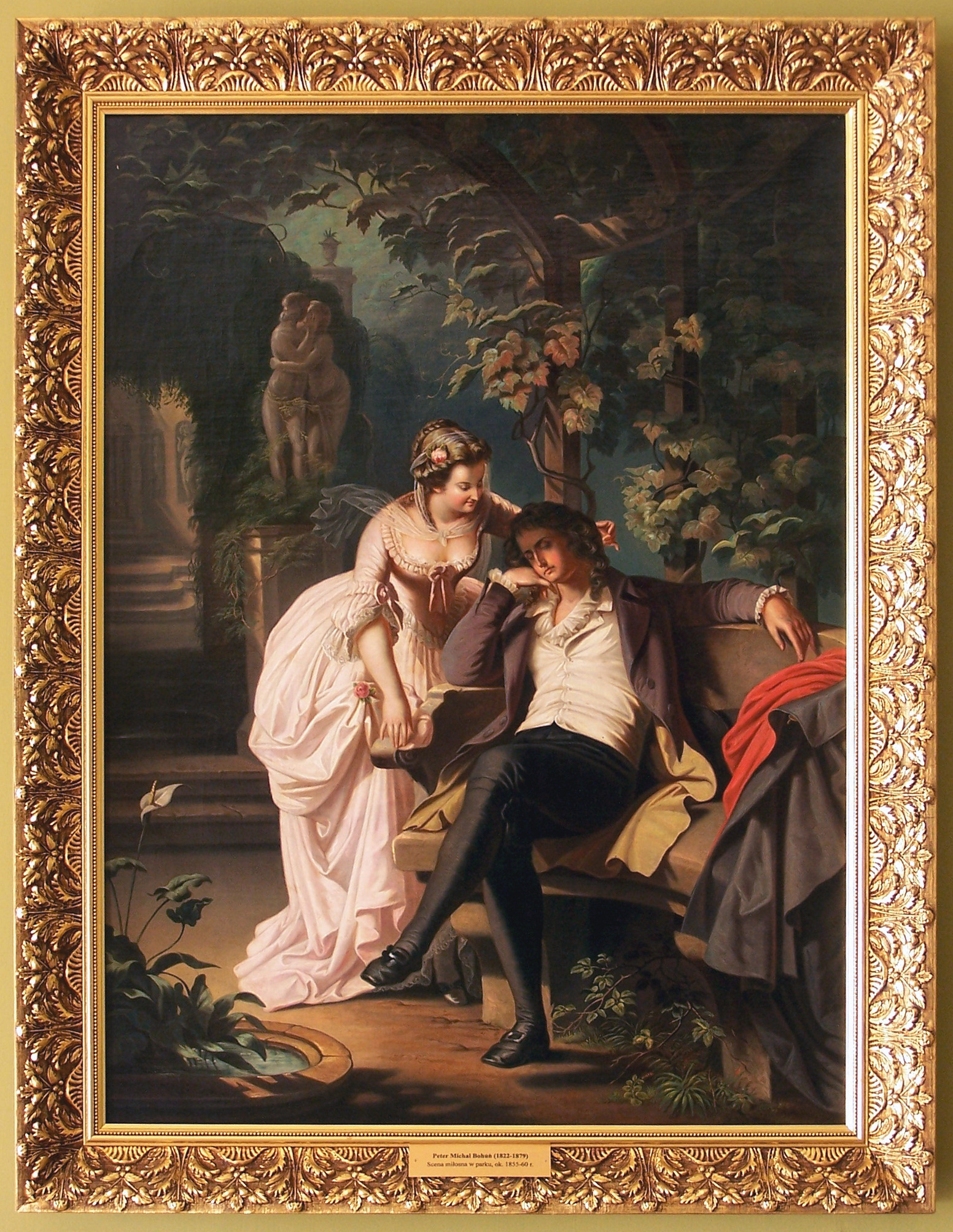
Love Scene in a Park, Peter Michal Bohúň, ca. 1860

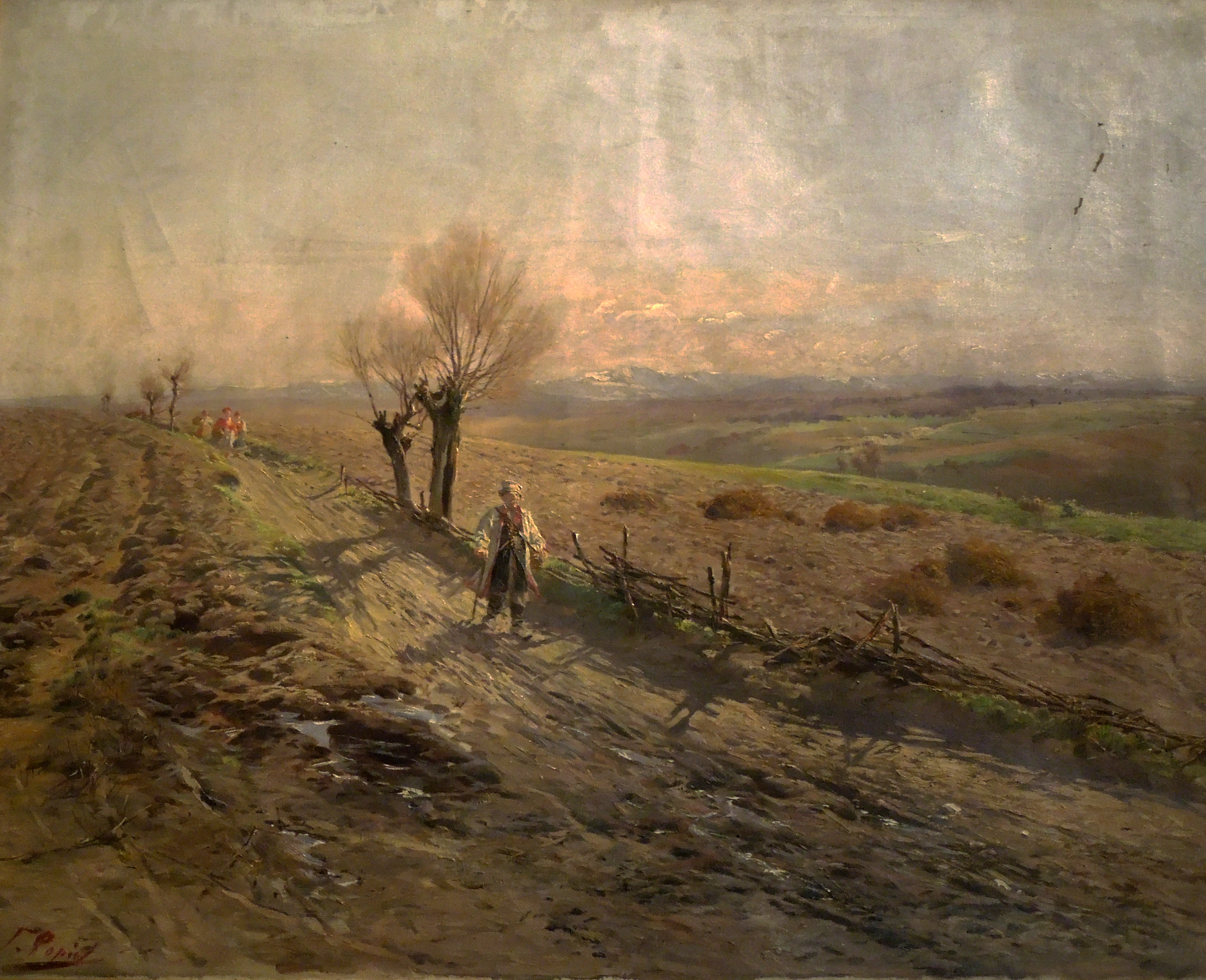
A Countryside Road Near Kraków, Tadeusz Popiel, ca. 1890

== See also ==
- Bielsko-Biała
- List of castles in Poland
