= Weaver's House Museum =

Museum in Bielsko-Biała, Poland

Coordinates: 49°49′12.4″N 19°2′7.5″E

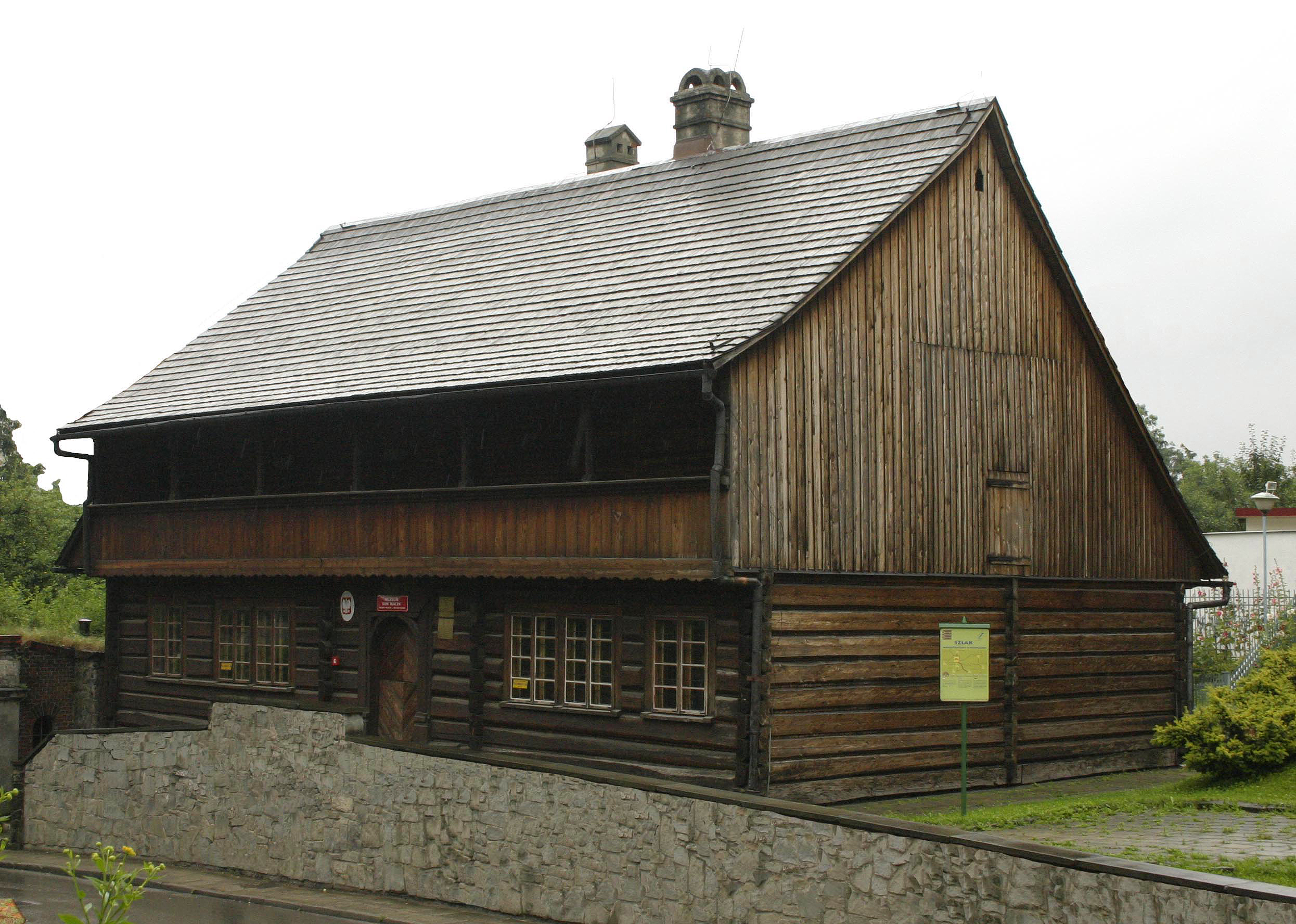
The museum building

The Weaver's House (Polish: Dom Tkacza) is a unique example of the 18th-century craftsman architecture. Located in Bielsko-Biała, it is situated in Stare Bielsko in a log cabin with its characteristic hay store. The building is a museum branch belonging to the Museum in Bielsko-Biała.

The building functioned as a house and a workshop until the beginnings of the 20th century. The information about its tenants is incomplete. In the second half of the 18th century it certainly was the Bartke family's and in the 19th century the Bathelts’. From 1873 the owner of the building was Carl Nowak and after his death - Marie, the widow. At the beginning of the 20th century it belonged to the local shoemaker, Antoni Polończyk After the World War II the building became a tenement house until Antoni's son, Wiktor Polończyk, donated it to the Polish State in 1974 in order to establish a museum there. When in 1992 the long-lasting renovation works finished, the District Museum in Bielsko-Biała opened the exhibition to the public.

== Museum exhibition ==
The museum exhibition presents the interiors of the house and the workshop belonging to a guild master – the highest in rank guild representative. They show what it looked like at the turn of the 19th century, when the importance and greatness of the handicraft (in terms of the textile industry) lessened because of the sudden and rapid introduction of machines. The hallway divides the building into two parts: the workshop on the left and the living area on the right.

The workshop is the largest room, containing objects connected with the weaver's work. The most impressive is the large harness loom dating back to the 18th century used for making wool textiles and there are also devices used for warping. A part of this room was devoted for the office work which consisted in handling the guild matters and settling disputes between craftsmen. All documents, guild heirlooms and the iron coffer used as the guild strongbox are stored here. The workshop also served as an apprentice's bedroom, that is why there is some of his equipment next to the stove.

From the workshop the hallway leads to the kitchen - the place of everyday family and social life. This room holds dishes, kitchen utensils and everyday use objects as well as objects connected with weaving. There is a small loom (19th century) and the visitors have a chance to see how it works. Besides you can see a spinning wheel and a reel.

Next to the kitchen there is a bedroom and a sort of living room, used only on special occasions, whitewashed, arranged with veneered furniture from the turn of the 19th century.

As a supplement to the exhibition on the display there are Jan Wałach's woodcuts presenting weavers at work.

== Bibliography ==
- Filip, Elżbieta Teresa Muzeum w Bielsku-Białej Dom Tkacza, 1st.Ed, Museum in Bielsko-Biała, Bielsko-Biała 2004 ISBN 83-88105-15-9
- Kenig, Piotr & Chorąży, Bogusław Zarys Dziejów Bielskiego Przemysłu i Przewodnik po Ekspozycji Włókienniczej, 1st. Ed, Museum in Bielsko-Biała, Bielsko-Biała 2006, ISBN 83-88105-10-8.

== See also ==
- Bielsko-Biała Museum
- The Museum of Technology and Textile Industry
- Bielsko-Biała
