= Bielsko-Biała City Hall =

Historic city hall in Bielsko-Biała, Poland

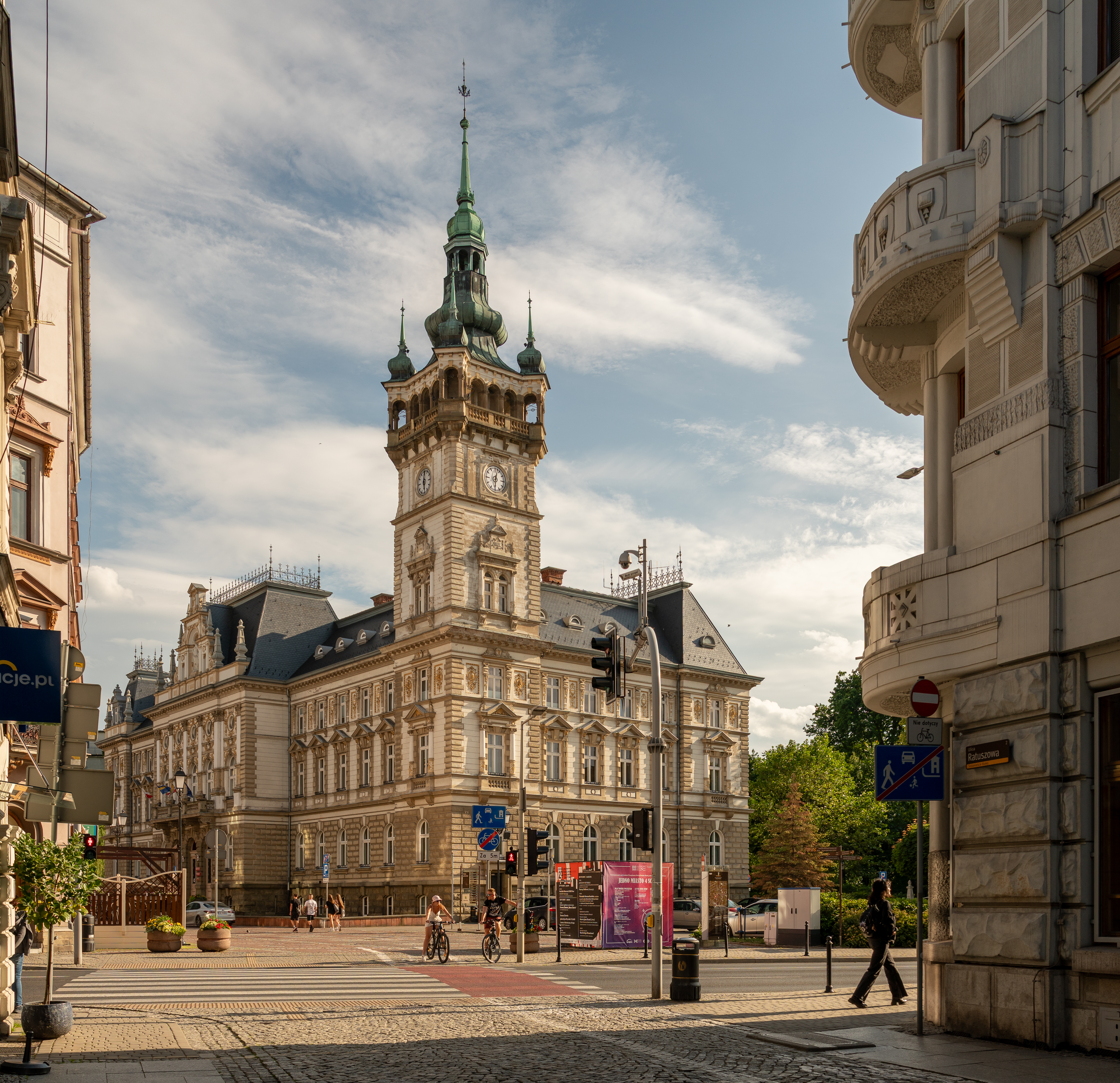
- Interactive map of the Bielsko-Biała City Hall area

General information
- Type: city hall
- Architectural style: Neo-Renaissance
- Location: Bielsko-Biała, Poland
- Coordinates: 49°49′18.5″N 19°3′3″E
- Construction started: 1895
- Completed: 1897
- Owner: Biała; Communal Savings Bank in Biała; Bielsko-Biała

Height
- Height: 52 m

Technical details
- Floor count: 3

Design and construction
- Architect: Emanuel Rost

The Bielsko-Biała City Hall is a Neo-Renaissance, historic city hall located at City Hall Square in Bielsko-Biała, administratively within the boundaries of the Biała Śródmieście district and within the registration area of Biała Miasto. It was built between 1895 and 1897 according to the design by Emanuel Rost. Originally, it housed the city hall of Biała, the Communal Savings Bank, as well as several other institutions and apartments for officials. Since 1951, it has been the seat of the Mayor, the City Council, and some departments of the Municipal Office in Bielsko-Biała.

== History ==
In the 1890s, the Austro-Hungarian authorities in Biała recognized that the city hall, built in 1827 and situated in the market square (nowadays Wojska Polskiego Square), was insufficient for the rapidly developing city. It was decided to construct a new building, with sponsorship secured from the Communal Savings Bank, a local bank founded in 1883.

In February 1894, the management of the Communal Savings Bank announced an architectural competition for the design of the building, which was intended to serve a dual function – housing the bank's headquarters and the city hall. The competition requirements precisely defined the expectations for the modern building, emphasizing both functionality and the grandeur of the city hall. It was to be a municipal public building with a recognizable landmark tower with a clock. The organization of the competition was entrusted to the Austrian Association of Engineers and Architects (German: Österreichischer Ingenieur- und Architektenverein). The jury consisted of three Viennese architects: Ludwig Wächtler, Franz Neumann, and Herman Helmer.

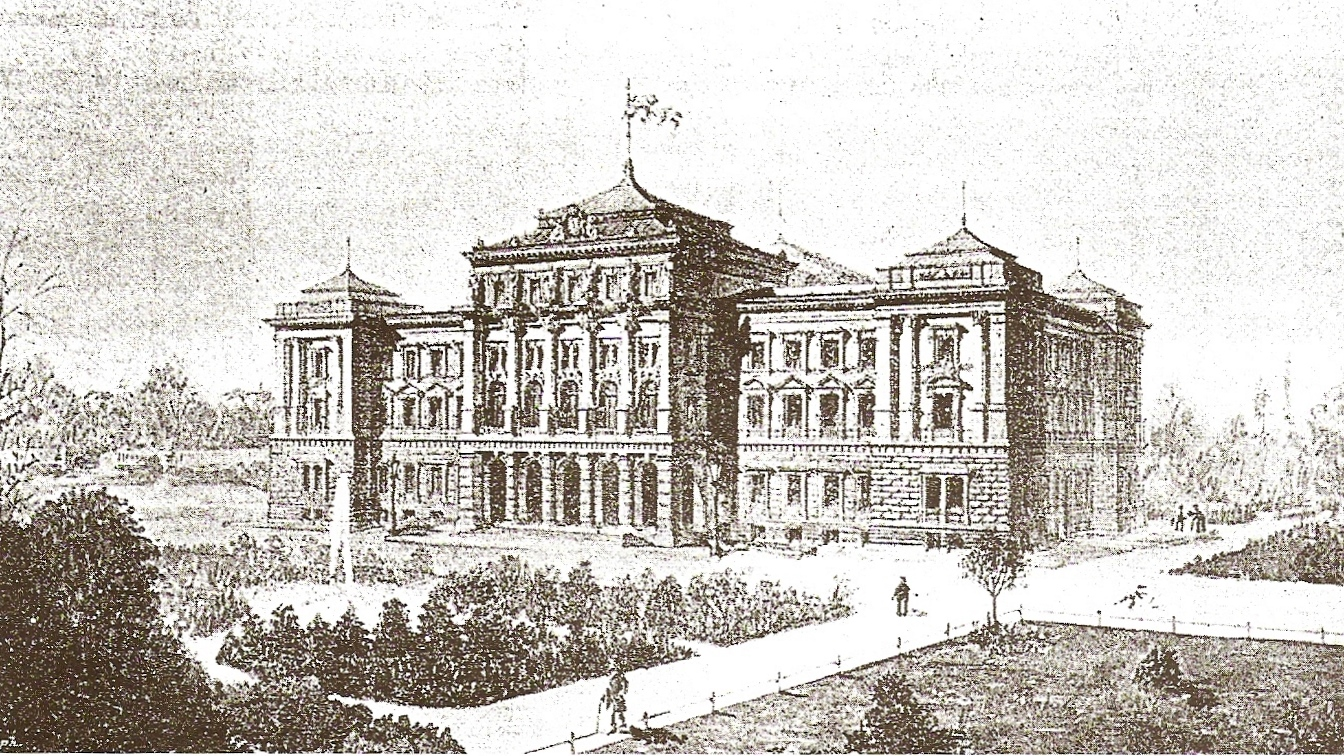
Unrealized project of the City Hall in Biała by Carl Korn

On 24 July 1894, the jury selected the winning design for execution from eight proposals. Only two of them are known today: the project under the slogan Honoris Causa by Carl Korn and Coalition 2 by Emanuel Rost. Rost's project won the competition and was chosen for implementation, undergoing several post-competition revisions and changes. Korn's proposal ranked second, probably due to the building's excessive size and the absence of the tower, which was stipulated in the competition conditions.

Construction work began on 1 September 1895, and was completed on 30 September 1897. Ignatz Ungwer supervised the construction. The construction costs, initially estimated at 200,000 Austro-Hungarian krones, eventually amounted to 612,000 krones. The Communal Savings Bank and the municipal authorities, led by Mayor Johann Rosner, moved into the new building on 17 October 1897. Soon after, it also became the headquarters of the police and a 20-person municipal guard unit, with a prison located in the basement. The Civic Society occupied one room, next to which, founded on 3 December 1904, was the Bielsko-Biała Museum and Castle. The top floor was designated for officials' residences. A municipal park was established west of the building in 1897.

Due to the lack of space in the cramped urban structures of Biała, the city hall was erected on sparsely built land south of the city center, at the confluence of the Biała and Niwka rivers, near Feuerwehrplatz (Fire Brigade Square). The location of the building also had an ideological aspect. It was adjacent to the Lipnik Manor, the former seat of the Lipnik starostas, on whom the citizens of Biała were dependent in the 18th century. The imposing building clearly overshadowed the starostas' manor, which a few years earlier, in 1893, had been transferred by Archduke Albrecht to the convent sisters for use as a monastery and school. The city hall thus became a manifestation of local self-government, which in the 19th century overcame the feudal system.

In 1951, with the merger of Bielsko and Biała into one city, the former Biała city hall became the seat of the Mayor, the Municipal Office (currently some offices, including the Customer Service Office, are located in buildings at 6 and 7 City Hall Square), and the Municipal Council of Bielsko-Biała.

In 1993, conservation work began on the clock tower and roof. Two years earlier, in 1991, the old clock on the tower was replaced with a new electronic one, while the former historic clock was handed over to a museum. The main restoration work, however, took place in between 1996 and 1997, and included both the facade and the interiors. On the centenary of its existence, the city hall was restored to its original 19th-century appearance, largely based on old photographs and Emanuel Rost's design drawings.

In April 2008, the National Bank of Poland issued a commemorative coin from the series 32 Historic Cities of Poland with a face value of 2 PLN, featuring an image of the Bielsko-Biała City Hall on the reverse side. In 2009, the Bielsko-Biała City Hall was featured on a postcard representing the country during the Eurovision Song Contest.

== Architecture ==
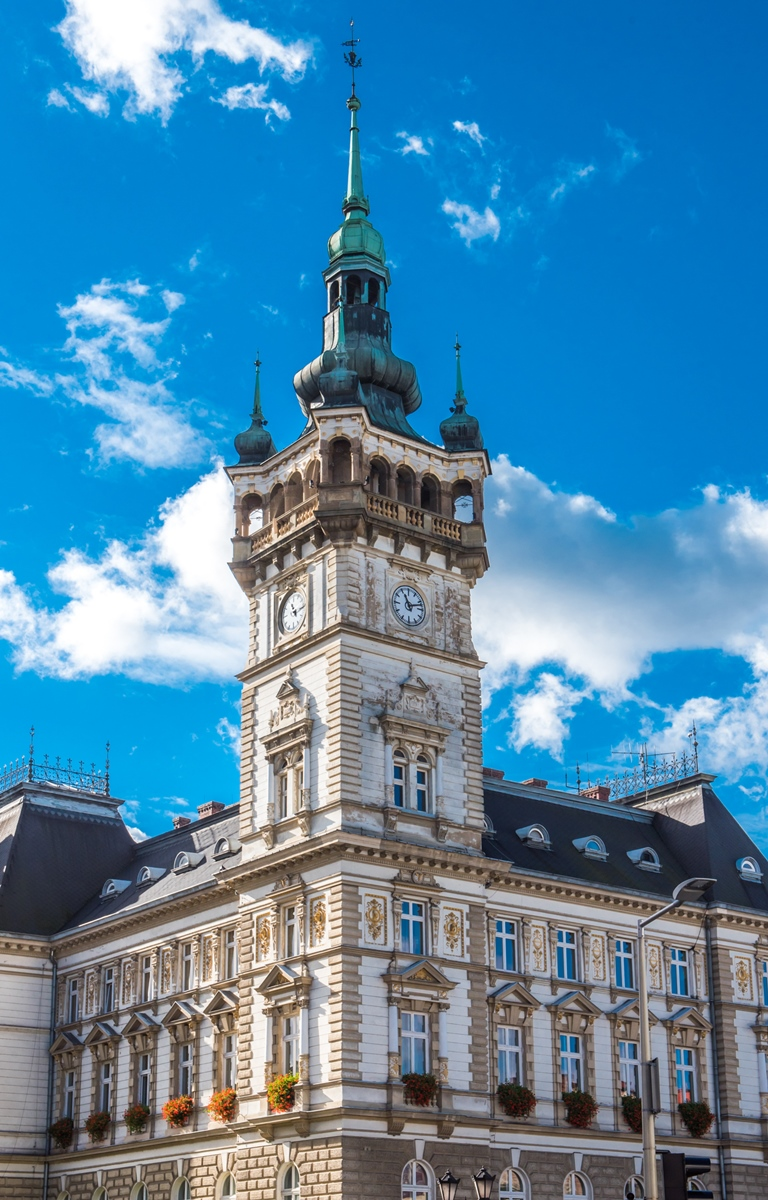
Clock tower

The building covers an area of 1278 m^{2} and was constructed on the plan of an elongated rectangle. The symmetrical structure is accentuated by the central avant-corps of the vestibule and the Council Chamber, topped with a separate gambrel roof, as well as smaller corner avant-corps (the northeast one transitioning into a tower). The western side of the building features two short wings, giving it the character of a horseshoe layout. In the southern part, a square well with a side staircase is located.

The city hall building consists of three storeys. The articulation of the walls highlights the lower part – the basement and the ground floor – in the form of a rusticated socle with a stone cladding. The first floor served as the representative piano nobile. It was emphasized by deeply projecting, rhythmically spaced window abutments, contrasting with the delicate, flat composition of the top floor with shallow divisions, featuring herm pilasters and ornamental panels between the windows.

The arrangement of the individual facades relative to each other is clearly hierarchical. The rear, western part of the building is the most modest. As one approaches the facade, the articulation and ornamentation become denser, pointing to the central avant-corps, which has the most architectural details and ideological content.

It follows the principle of a tripartite arcade loggia: three entrance portals and a traditional proclamation balcony – an indispensable element of 19th-century city hall architecture, although devoid of its original function and serving purely as a decorative element. The wall divisions feature doubled Ionic pilasters and dense ornamentation with Neo-Renaissance motifs of fittings, cartouches, floral festoons, and the city's coat of arms entwined with symbolic palm and laurel branches, heads of young men and women in Renaissance attire placed between faux French doors and oculi above. The entire composition is crowned with a gable featuring obelisks typical of northern Neo-Renaissance. In the center stands a stone sculpture of the goddess Eirene with a cornucopia and a small Plutus, the god of wealth, by her side. At the highest point of the gable, there is a heraldic shield with a bee motif, considered a symbol of industriousness and prudence. This symbolism relates to the existence of the Communal Savings Bank in the building but also glorifies bourgeois industriousness, peace, and prosperity, depicted as the most important elements of the contemporary cultural and civilizational order. The compositional layout of the central projection has an analogy in the facade of the Vienna Palace of Justice, built in 1883 according to the design of Alexander Wielemans von Monteforte.

The composition of the city hall facade is based on the principles of symmetry and axiality, although the original layout was disrupted by the addition of the clock tower, which was an integral element of 19th-century city halls but devoid of practical function. Its significance was purely symbolic – it symbolized the sovereignty of municipal self-government and the equality of its status with churches and castles.

The clock tower is a natural extension of the northeastern avant-corps. It is 52 m tall, measured from the base. It is massive, square, covered with a bulbous tented roof with a long gallery and a spire surrounded by four corner domes. It has a loggia with corner bay windows. The tower houses a computerized clock with a chime, which plays the city anthem every three hours. The date of completion of the construction, 1897, is displayed in decorative framing around the window located at the base of the tower.

The architecture of the Bielsko-Biała City Hall clearly references the forms of the Viennese city palace and the emerging "rental palace", i.e., a luxury tenement with features of a city palace residence. Emanuel Rost introduced rarely used northern motifs in Austria, such as steep roofs and ornamental fittings and curving cartouches. As a result, while the city hall shares many similarities with Viennese architecture, it also features distinctively northern elements.

== Interiors ==
=== Vestibule and staircase ===
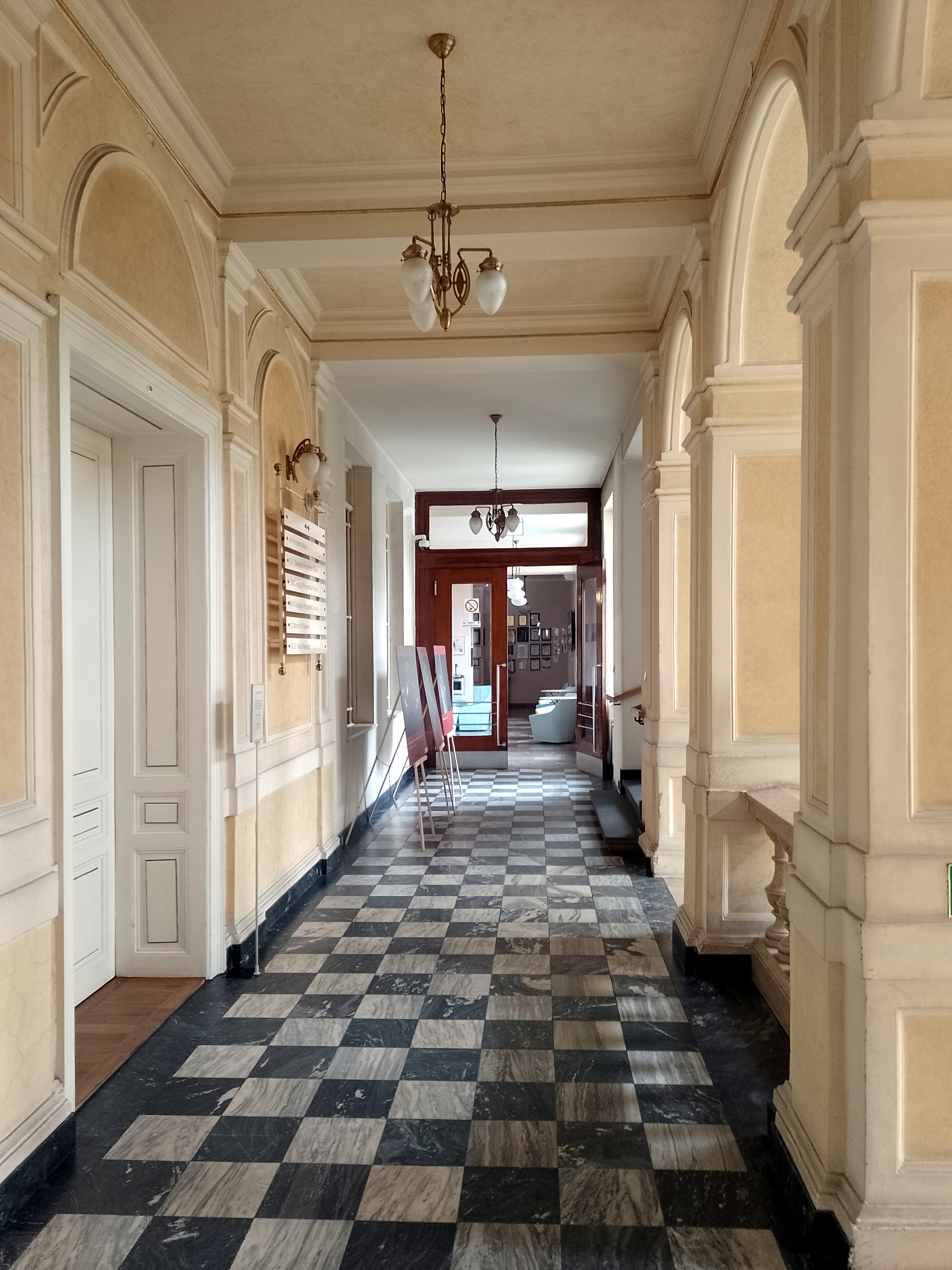
Corridor by the staircase on the second floor

The vestibule is located on the ground floor of the city hall. Along with the Council Chamber, it is separated from the building's mass, forming the central avant-corps.

It features groin-barrel vaults supported by eight Tuscan granite columns, arranged in pairs. The space creates an atmosphere of solemnity and austere simplicity. The vestibule opens up to the sides, leading towards the rooms on the ground floor, which housed the Communal Savings Bank in the past.

On the axis, a tunnel-like extension of the stairway leads to the staircase. The staircase is located in the western part of the building, in a square space covered with a mirrored vault with lunettes. Traces of the original plafond still exist. The walls feature a monumental, Neo-Renaissance articulation with three-arched Ionic divisions. The stairs split in a palatial manner into two mirrored flights with a marble single-rail balustrade. The staircase, connecting the vestibule to the first floor, is enclosed by a representative three-arched opening leading straight to the Council Chamber and other rooms on the first floor, which have housed the municipal administration from the beginning. The space of the staircase clearly separates the functions of the building, which were once different on each floor. The solemnity of the vestibule transitions into a lighter, Ionian-Neo-Renaissance style in the latter part, with pastel-colored marble balustrades. A separate, two-flight staircase leads to the second floor, which was once residential, located in the southern part of the building.

A similar arrangement of the vestibule and staircase can be found, among others, in one of the Vienna tenement buildings on Stadiongasse, built in 1883, one of the early works of Otto Wagner, and in the University of Vienna building designed by Heinrich von Ferstel in 1884.

=== Council Chamber ===
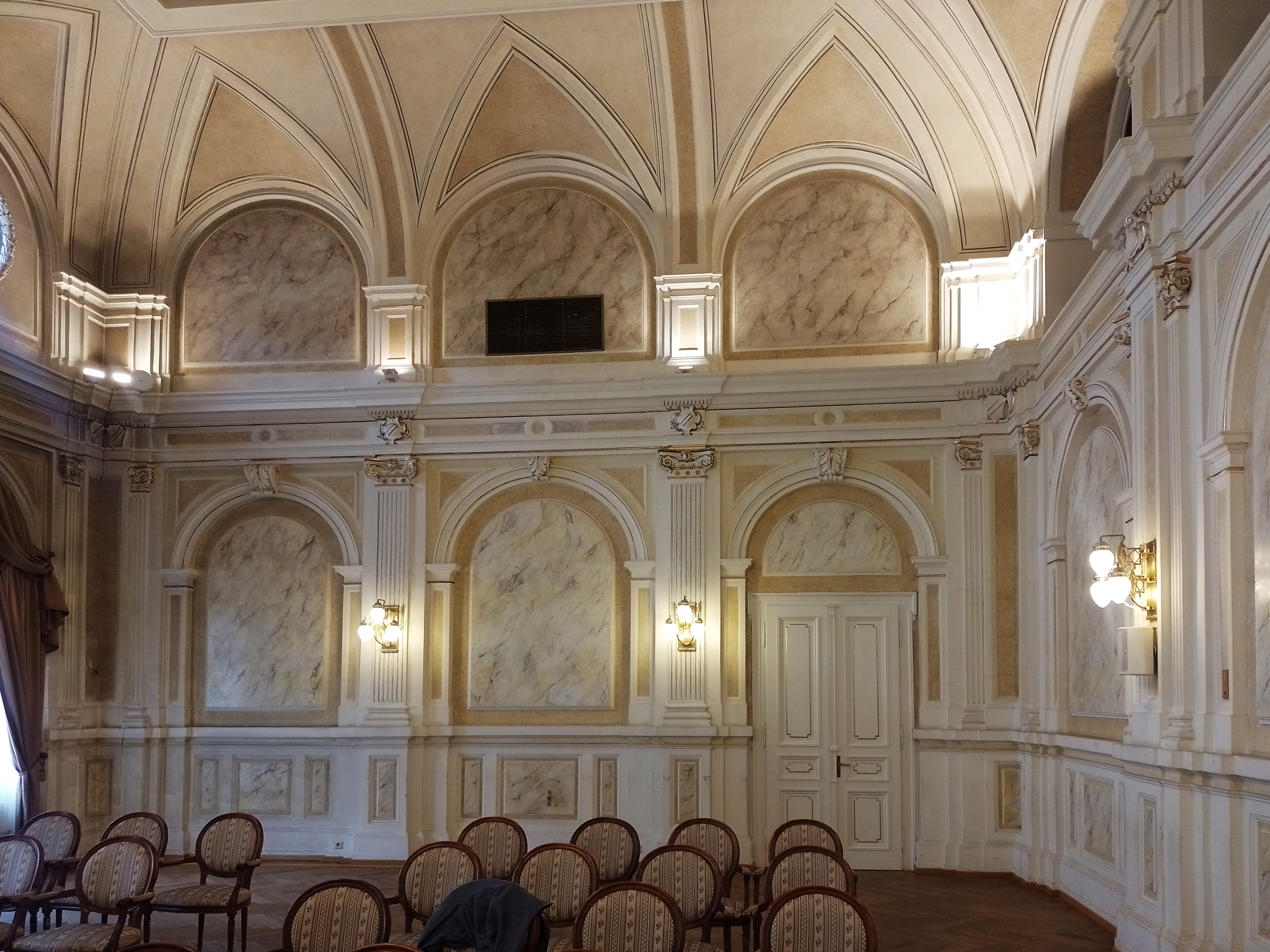
Council Chamber

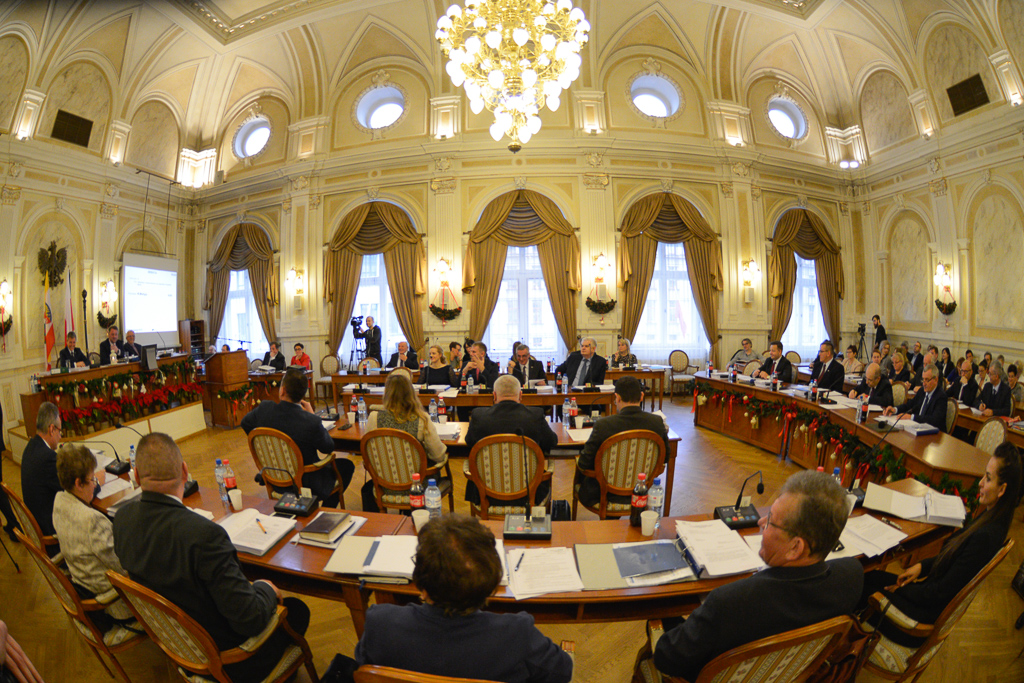
Council Chamber during the session of the City Council

The Council Chamber is located on the first floor, in the piano nobile zone, and together with the ground-floor vestibule, it is separated from the building's mass, forming the central avant-corps. An announcement balcony adjoins it. Both the central location of the Council Chamber and its architectural form are one of the hallmarks of the "city hallness" of such buildings in the 19th century. From the very beginning, it has served as the meeting room of the city council.

The Council Chamber, 8.6 m high, covers an area of 160 m^{2}. It is the most decorative element of the interiors of the Bielsko-Biała City Hall. Its interior is covered with a mirrored vault with lunettes, which was originally decorated with murals, now nonexistent. The walls are filled with dense architectural articulation, incorporating elements of mural decoration. The articulation of the walls is carried out with Ionic pilasters on tall socles, supporting an elaborate entablature containing decorative panels in cartouche frames in the cornice zone, and oculi in the eastern wall. Epitaph-like aediculae are inserted between the socles. In the center of these compositions was originally a portrait gallery of the mayors of Biała, removed in 1945. The eastern wall is pierced by porte-fenêtre windows. The opposite western wall houses the entrance at the bottom and a gallery for the public at the top.

The direction of the composition of the Council Chamber was determined by the northern wall. In its center, there was once a powerful composition outlined by Ionic columns, closed with a semi-oval, interrupted abutment containing an oval frame, where from 1897 to 1918 there was a bust of the Austrian-Hungarian emperor, Franz Joseph I. In the frieze zone, the city's coat of arms was displayed in an ornate cartouche.

The bust of the Austrian emperor and the portrait gallery of mayors created dual ideological references: loyalty to the state and references to local heritage.

The compositional elements of the Council Chamber resemble, in proportion, the architecture of the Natural History Museum in Vienna, built in 1891.

== City Hall at present ==
In the city hall, there are offices for the Mayor and his deputies, as well as the City Council Office in Bielsko-Biała. The Council Chamber serves as a meeting room. Additionally, the following departments of the Municipal Office are located here:

- Press Office
- Personal Data Administrator's Office
- European Funds Office
- Proxy Office for Management System Affairs
- Proxy Office for Classified Information Protection Affairs
- Occupational Health and Safety Position
- Administrative and Economic Department
- Internal Audit and Control Department
- Budget Department
- Finance and Accounting Department
- Culture and Arts Department
- Organization and Supervision Department
- Legal Department
- City Promotion Department
- Economic Development and Strategy Department
- Crisis Management Department

The Administrative and Economic Department of the Municipal Office is the building administrator.

The city hall is open during the Municipal Office's working hours, which are Monday to Wednesday from 7:30 AM to 3:30 PM, Thursdays from 8:00 AM to 5:00 PM, and Fridays from 8:00 AM to 3:00 PM. The viewing tower is not accessible to tourists (entry is only possible with permission).
