= Bolek and Lolek (TV series) =

1962 Polish children's adventure animated series

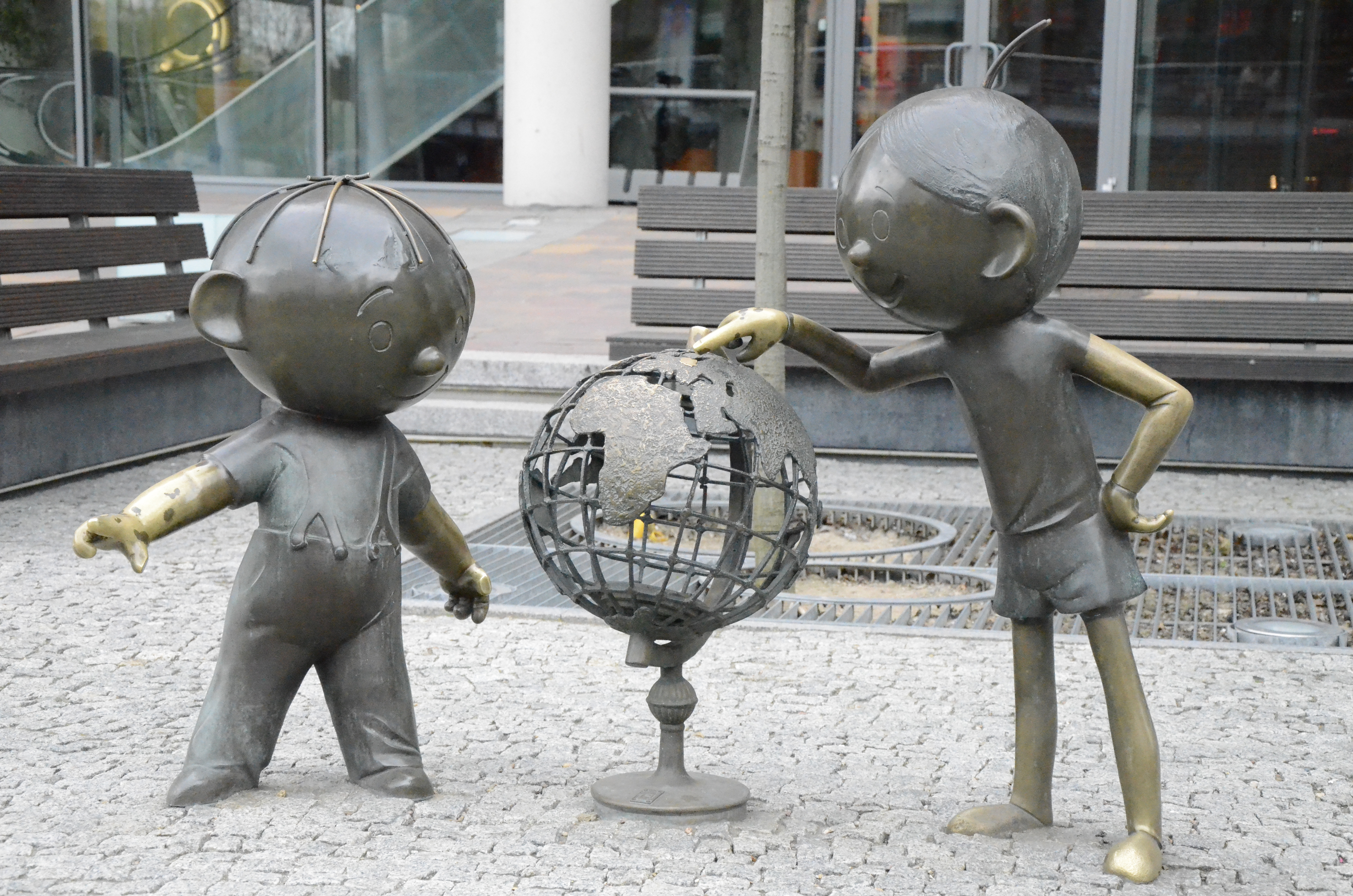
- The statues of Bolek and Lolek, the main characters of the series, in Bielsko-Biała, Poland.
- Genre: Buddy comedy; children's; slapstick
- Written by: Stanisław Dülz; Alfred Ledwig; Leszek Lorek; Lechosław Marszałek; Władysław Nehrebecki; Wacław Wajser; Edward Wątor
- Directed by: Stanisław Dülz; Alfred Ledwig; Leszek Lorek; Lechosław Marszałek; Władysław Nehrebecki; Wacław Wajser; Edward Wątor
- Composer: Waldemar Kazanecki
- No. of seasons: 1
- No. of episodes: 13

Production
- Cinematography: Mieczysław Poznański; Zdzisław Poznański
- Editor: Alojzy Mol
- Running time: 8–10 minutes
- Production company: Studio Filmów Rysunkowych

Original release
- Network: Polish Television
- Release: 12 August 1962 – 1 June 1964

Bolek and Lolek (Polish: Bolek i Lolek, [ˈbɔ.lɛk ˈi ˈlɔ.lɛk]), also known as Benny & Lenny, Jym & Jam, and Tim & Tom, is a 1962 children's slapstick buddy comedy animated television series created by Władysław Nehrebecki for Studio Filmów Rysunkowych. The series consists of 13 episodes, each with a running time ranching from 8 to 10 minutes. The series was distributed by Polish Television, and was originally aired from 12 August 1962 to 1 July 1964. The series was the first instalment in the franchise about two titular brothers, Bolek and Lolek. It was later followed by series Bolek and Lolek on Vacation, aired from 1965 to 1966.

== Premise ==
Two young brothers, Bolek and Lolek, play with each other, with their games usually being inspired by films, television, and books.

== Production ==
The series was created by Władysław Nehrebecki for the animation film studio Studio Filmów Rysunkowych, based in Bielsko-Biała, Poland. Its episodes were written and directed by Stanisław Dülz, Alfred Ledwig, Leszek Lorek, Lechosław Marszałek, Władysław Nehrebecki, Wacław Wajser, and Edward Wątor. The cinematography was done by Mieczysław Poznański and Zdzisław Poznański, editing by Alojzy Mol, and music by Waldemar Kazanecki. In total, the series had 13 episodes, each with a running time ranchening from 8 to 10 minutes. It was distributed by the Polish Television, with the first episode being released on 12 August 1962. The next five episodes aired on 1 July 1963, while the rest aired on 1 July 1964. The seriews was the first instalment in the franchise about brothers Bolek and Lolek. It was followed by series Bolek and Lolek on Vacation, aired from 1965 to 1966. In the Anglophonic markets, she series was released under the names Benny & Lenny, Jym and Jam, and Tim & Tom.

== Episodes ==
No.	Title	Directed by	Written by	Animated by	Original release date
1	"The Crossbow" (Polish: Kusza)	Władysław Nehrebecki	Władysław Nehrebecki	Józef Byrdy; Barbara Terlikiewicz	12 August 1962
Bolek and Lolek play with a crossbow until they realise its too dangerous.
2	"The Yeti" (Polish: Yeti)	Leszek Lorek	Leszek Lorek	Edmund Knopek; Rufin Struzik	1 July 1963
Bolek and Lolek play as explorers seeking the Yeti in the snowy mountains.
3	"The Brave Cowboys" (Polish: Dzielni kowboje)	Stanisław Dülz	Leszek Lorek; Władysław Nehrebecki	Tadeusz Wyroba	1 July 1963
Inspired by a Western film, Bolek and Lolek play as cowboys, carousing chaos around them, until they are calmed down by an iritated dog.
4	"Crossed Swords" (Polish: Skrzyżowane szpady)	Wacław Wajser	Wacław Wajser	Romuald Kłys; Bronisław Zeman	1 July 1963
Inspired by the character of Zorro, Bolek and Lolek dress up as him and begun to fencing with épées, causing damages to their surroundings, which they later have to fix.
5	"The Animal Tamer" (Polish: Pogromca zwierząt)	Edward Wątor	Leszek Lorek; Władysław Nehrebecki	Antoni Duda; Stefan Simka	1 July 1963
Inspired by watching lion taming on television, Bolek and Lolek attempt to train geese. Later, Lolek dresses up as a tiger, and forces Bolek to perform circus tricks, to the delight of others children.
6	"The Bull Fight" (Polish: Corrida)	Lechosław Marszałek	Lechosław Marszałek	Józef Ćwiertnia; Tadeusz Gwizdak; Rufin Struzik	1 July 1963
Inspired by watching a bullfight on television, Bolek and Lolek attempt to recreate it with a goat.
7	"The Indian Trophy" (Polish: Indiańskie trofeum)	Alfred Ledwig	Alfred Ledwig	Eugeniusz Kotowski	1 July 1964
Inspired by watching a Western film, Bolek and Lolek dress up and play as Native Americans, setting up a wigwam. Their fun is eventually ended by a sheep ramming into their wigwam.
8	"The Cosmonauts" (Polish: Kosmonauci)	Leszek Lorek	Leszek Lorek	Edmund Knopek; Rufin Struzik	1 July 1964
Inspired by the spaceflight of Yuri Gagarin, Bolek and Lolek attempt and fail to construct a rocket and fly to outer space.
9	"King of the Forest" (Polish: Król puszczy)	Alfred Ledwig	Alfred Ledwig	Tadeusz Gwizdak; Eugeniusz Kotowski	1 July 1964
Inspired by the story of Tarzan, Bolek and Lolek play as him, together with their dog Azorek, and a squirrel.
10	"Robinson"	Stanisław Dülz	Leszek Lorek; Władysław Nehrebecki	Wiesław Chrapkiewicz; Stanisław Świder; Tadeusz Wyroba	1 July 1964
After reading Robinson Crusoe, Bolek and Lolek play as the titular character stranded on an island, and its native resident, Friday.
11	"The Treasure Seekers" (Polish: Poławiacze skarbów)	Lechosław Marszałek	Lechosław Marszałek	Józef Ćwiertnia; Antoni Duda; Stefan Simka; Rufin Struzik	1 July 1964
Bolek and Lolek play as treasure seekers, going down the river on a boat, and fishing out the rubbish, which they later take to a scrapyard.
12	"The Athletes" (Polish: Sportowcy)	Wacław Wajser	Wacław Wajser	Edmund Knopek; Romuald Kłys; Bronisław Zeman	1 July 1964
Bolek and Lolek train running and jumping for ae school sports competition on a sports field.
13	"The Two Knights" (Polish: Dwaj rycerze)	Władysław Nehrebecki	Władysław Nehrebecki	Józef Byrdy; Barbara Terlikiewicz	1 July 1964
Bolek and Lolek go to an old castle, where at night, they get scared by a mouse and an owl. They discover a plate armour of a knight, which they bring to a museum.

== Awards and nominations ==
Award	Year	Category	Recipient(s)	Result	Ref.
Gijón International Film Festival	1965	Young Jury Award for Best Short Film	"The Crossbow"	Won	
Zlín Film Festival	1965	Golden Slipper	"The Crossbow"	Won	
