= Statue of Reksio (Radomsko) =

Monument in Radomsko, Poland

- Interactive map of Statue of Reksio
- Location: Radomsko, Poland
- Coordinates: 51.072781°N 19.441850°E
- Designer: Katarzyna Czpak
- Type: Statue
- Material: Bronze
- Height: c. 1 m
- Opening date: 28 October 2020
- Dedicated to: Reksio

The statue of Reksio (Polish pronunciation: [ˈrɛk.ɕɔ]; Polish: Pomnik Reksia) is a bronze sculpture in Radomsko, Łódź Voivodeship, Poland, placed at Metallurgii Street, near the shopping mall Galeria Radomsko. It consists of a statue of Reksio, a fictional dog from the children's animated adventure-comedy television series of the same name, which was produced from 1967 to 1990, and created by Lechosław Marszałek. The sculpture was designed by Katarzyna Czpak, and unveiled on 28 October 2020.

== History ==
The monument was dedicated to Reksio, a fictional dog from the children's animated adventure-comedy television series of the same name, which was originally produced from 1967 to 1990, and created by Lechosław Marszałek, who grew up in Radomsko. The statue was proposed by Marcin Kwarta, the chairman of the Foto Pozytyw Foundation, devoted to photography education. He also stated, that additional reason for the creation of the monument was that Reksio was seen taking a selfie, as early as the 1980s, being one of its earlier instances in the Polish media. The sculpture was designed by Katarzyna Czpak. It was unveiled on 28 October 2020, in front of the shopping mall Galeria Radomsko. In 2023, a metal roof was placed above the monument.

== Overview ==
The statue is placed in front of the 19th-century ironworks chimney, and near the shopping mall Galeria Radomsko. It consists of a bronze statue of Reksio, a fictional dog from the children's animated adventure-comedy television series of the same name, which was produced from 1967 to 1990, and created by Lechosław Marszałek. He is standing on his back paws, and with one of his ears pointing upwards and the other falling downwards. The sculpture measures around 1 metre. Two chairs stand on both sides of the statue, and a metal roof is placed above them.
