= Don Pedro =

Don Pedro may refer to:

== Places ==
- Don Pedro Dam, California
- Don Pedro Reservoir, California
- Don Pedro Island, Florida
- Lake Don Pedro, California, a census-designated place

== Fiction ==
- Don Pedro (play), a play by Richard Cumberland
- Don Pedro (Shakespeare character), a character in Shakespeare's Much Ado About Nothing
- Don Pedro Cleto Colaco, fictional character in the Indian film Finding Fanny (2014), played by Pankaj Kapoor
- Don Pedro de Pommidore, a fictional characters, and main antagonist, in the 1965 children's book The Abduction of Balthazar Sponge by Stanisław Pagaczewski, and the 1969 animated series of the same name

== Other uses ==
- Don Pedro (card game), an Anglo-Irish card game
- Don Pedro, the Spanish spelling of a Haitian Vodou houngan deified as Dan Petro

== See also ==
- Dom Pedro
