= Statue of Reksio (Bielsko-Biała) =

Monument in Bielsko-Biała, Poland

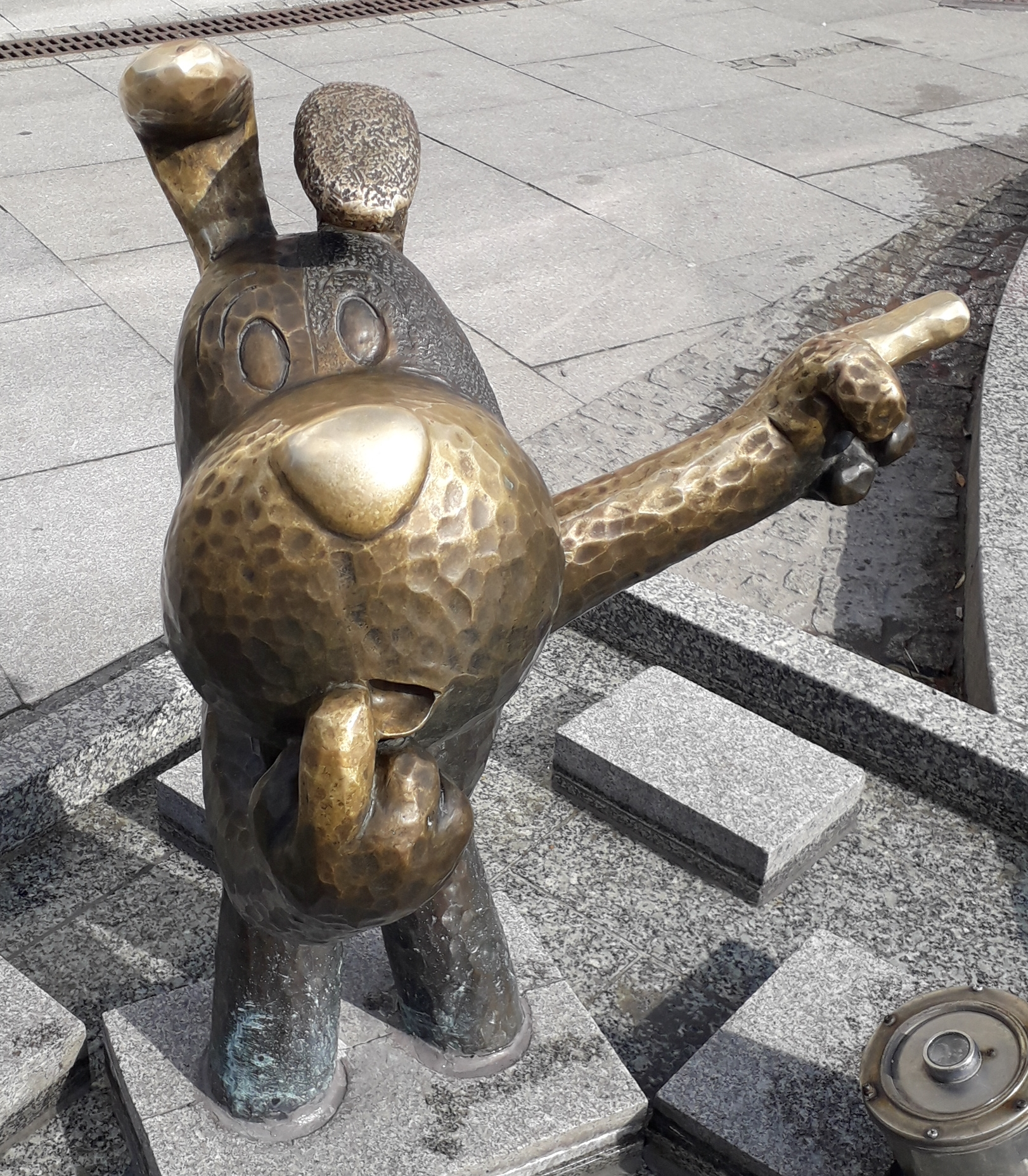
- The statue in 2018.
- Interactive map of Statue of Reksio
- Location: Bielsko-Biała, Poland
- Coordinates: 49°49′23.15″N 19°02′53.93″E
- Designer: Jerzy Mikler
- Type: Statue
- Material: Bronze
- Height: 90 cm (35 in)
- Opening date: 3 August 2009
- Dedicated to: Reksio

The statue of Reksio (Polish pronunciation: [ˈrɛk.ɕɔ]; Polish: Pomnik Reksia) is a monument in Bielsko-Biała, Poland, placed at a small square between Jedenastego Listopada and Stojałowskiego Streets. It consists of a bronze statue of Reksio, a fictional dog from the children's animated adventure-comedy television series of the same name, which was produced from 1967 to 1990 and created by Lechosław Marszałek. The monument was designed by Jerzy Mikler and unveiled on 3 August 2009.

== History ==
The monument was designed by sculptor Jerzy Mikler and unveiled on 3 August 2009. It is dedicated to Reksio, a fictional dog from the children's animated adventure-comedy television series of the same name, which was originally produced from 1967 to 1990 and created by Lechosław Marszałek in Bielsko-Biała-based Studio Filmów Rysunkowych.

On 1 September 2023, the Lechosław Marszałek Monument, designed by Wiesław Koronowski, was also unveiled nearby.

== Characteristics ==
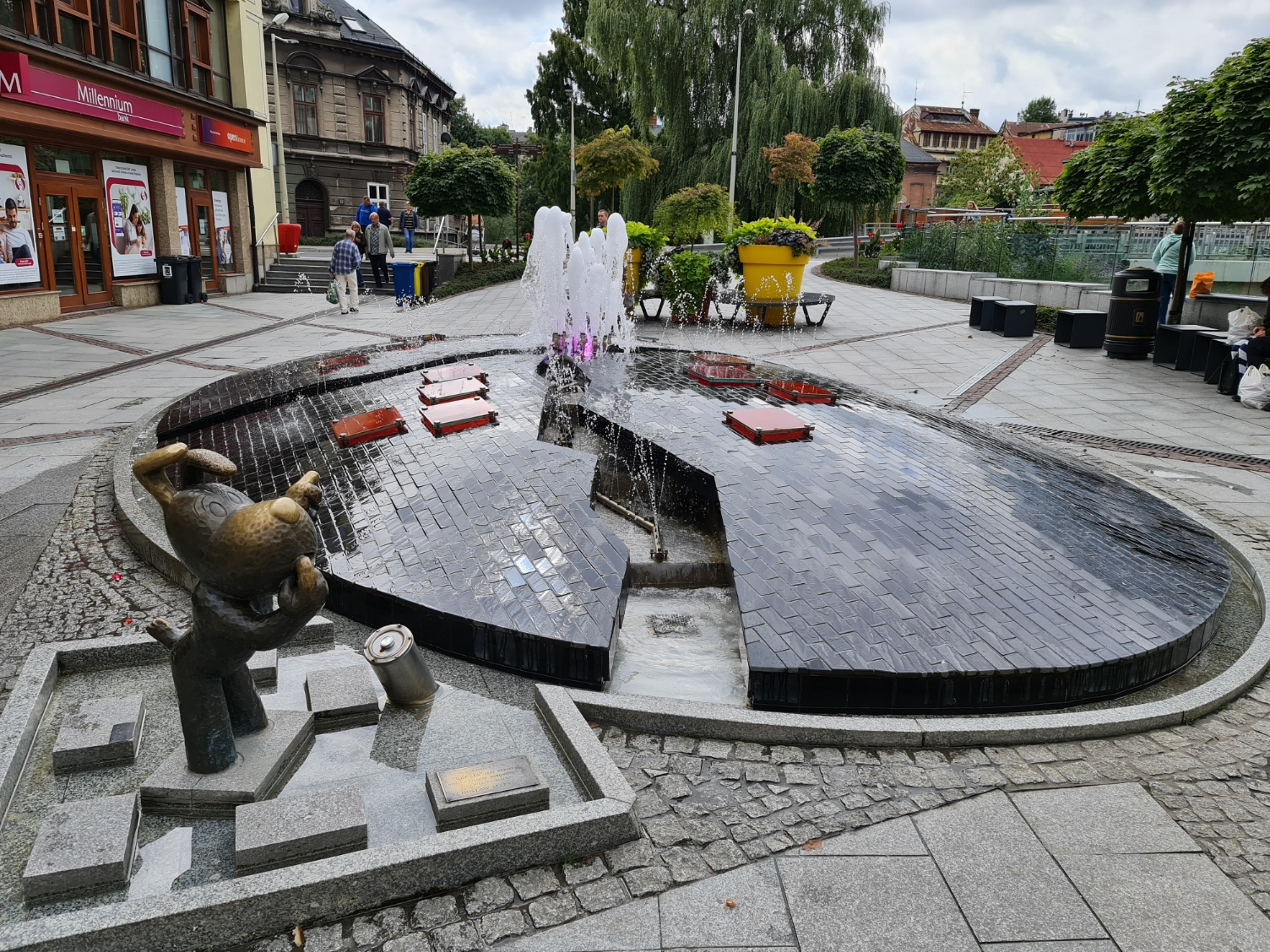
The statue of Reksio next to the fountain in 2021.

The monument is placed in Bielsko-Biała city centre, by the Biała river, at a small square between Jedynastego Listopada and Stojałowskiego Streets.

It consists of a bronze statue depicting Reksio, a fictional cartoon dog from the children's animated television series of the same name. He is standing on his back paws, with one hand put to his snout, and another pointing at the nearby fountain. He has a surprised expression on his face, with slightly opened mouth, and one of his ears pointing upwards and the other falling downwards. The sculpture is 90 centimeters tall and weights 130 kg.

The statue is placed next to a fountain in the shape of an uneven oval broken into four separate parts.

Near the sculpture is also a monument dedicated to the character's creator, Lechosław Marszałek. It has the form of a bronze statue, sitting on a bench, with scenes from the Reksio animated series depicted on its backrest.
