= Statues of Wawel Dragon and Bartolini Bartholomew =

Monument in Bielsko-Biała, Poland

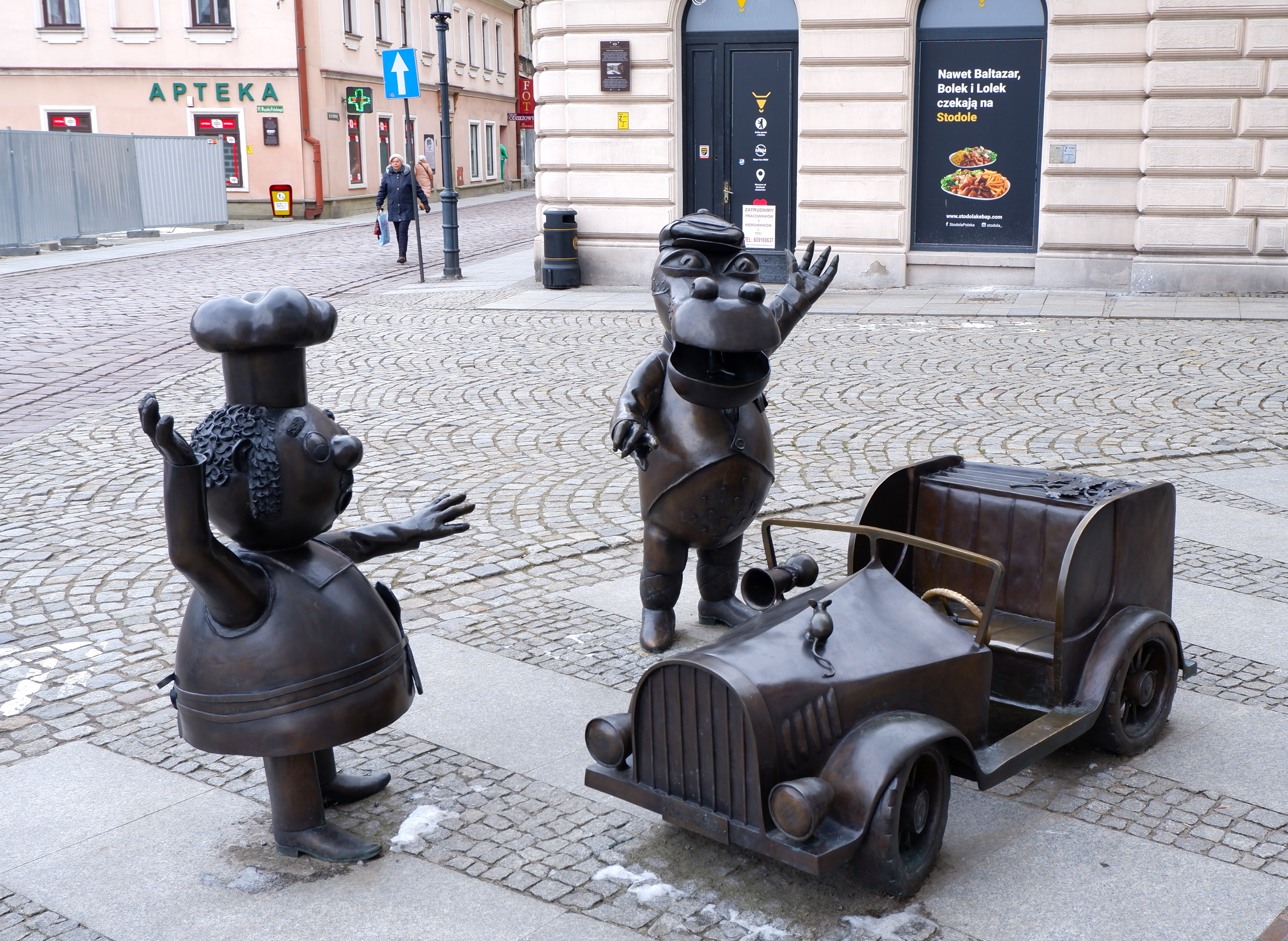
- The monument in 2022.
- Interactive map of Statues of Wawel Dragon and Bartolini Bartholomew
- Location: Jedynastego Listopada Street, Bielsko-Biała, Poland
- Coordinates: 49.822989°N 19.051131°E
- Designer: Lidia Sztwiertnia
- Type: Statue
- Material: Bronze
- Opening date: 3 December 2020

The statues of Wawel Dragon and Bartolini Bartholomew (Polish: Pomnik Smoka Wawelskiego i Bartoliniego Bartłomieja) is a monument in Bielsko-Biała, Poland, located at Jedynastego Listopada Street next to the Polish Armed Forces Square. It was designed by Lidia Sztwiertnia and unveiled on 3 December 2020. It consists of three bronze sculptures, including two main characters from animated series The Abduction of Balthazar Sponge, Wawel Dragon and Bartolini Bartholomew, as well as their car.

== History ==
The monument was dedicated to Wawel Dragon and Bartolini Bartholomew, two main characters from the 1969 animated children's series The Abduction of Balthazar Sponge, which was produced in Bielsko-Biała. The sculpture was designed by Lidia Sztwiertnia and unveiled on 3 December 2020. Tomasz Pagaczewski, son of Stanisław Pagaczewski, the author of the book that the series was based on, participated in the ceremony. The monument was part of a series of sculptures in the city dedicated to cartoons produced by Studio Filmów Rysunkowych.

On 22 September 2021, a monument was unveiled next to it dedicated to Don Pedro, the main antagonist from the animated series.

== Characteristics ==
The monument is located at Jedynastego Listopada Street next to the Polish Armed Forces Square. It consists of three bronze sculptures. This includes two cartoon characters, Wawel Dragon, an anthropomorphic dragon wearing a formal black jacket and a flat cap, and Bartolini Bartholomew, a chef wearing a uniform, including a hat and an apron. They are standing in front of a Brass Era-style convertible car, which the characters used in their travels in the series. The sculpture leaves the cabin open, allowing children to sit inside of it. The characters are depicted being scared of a mouse that sits on the car hood.

Next to it is placed a monument dedicated to Don Pedro, the main antagonist from the animated series.
