= The Abduction of Balthazar Sponge (TV series) =

1969 Polish-language children's animated series

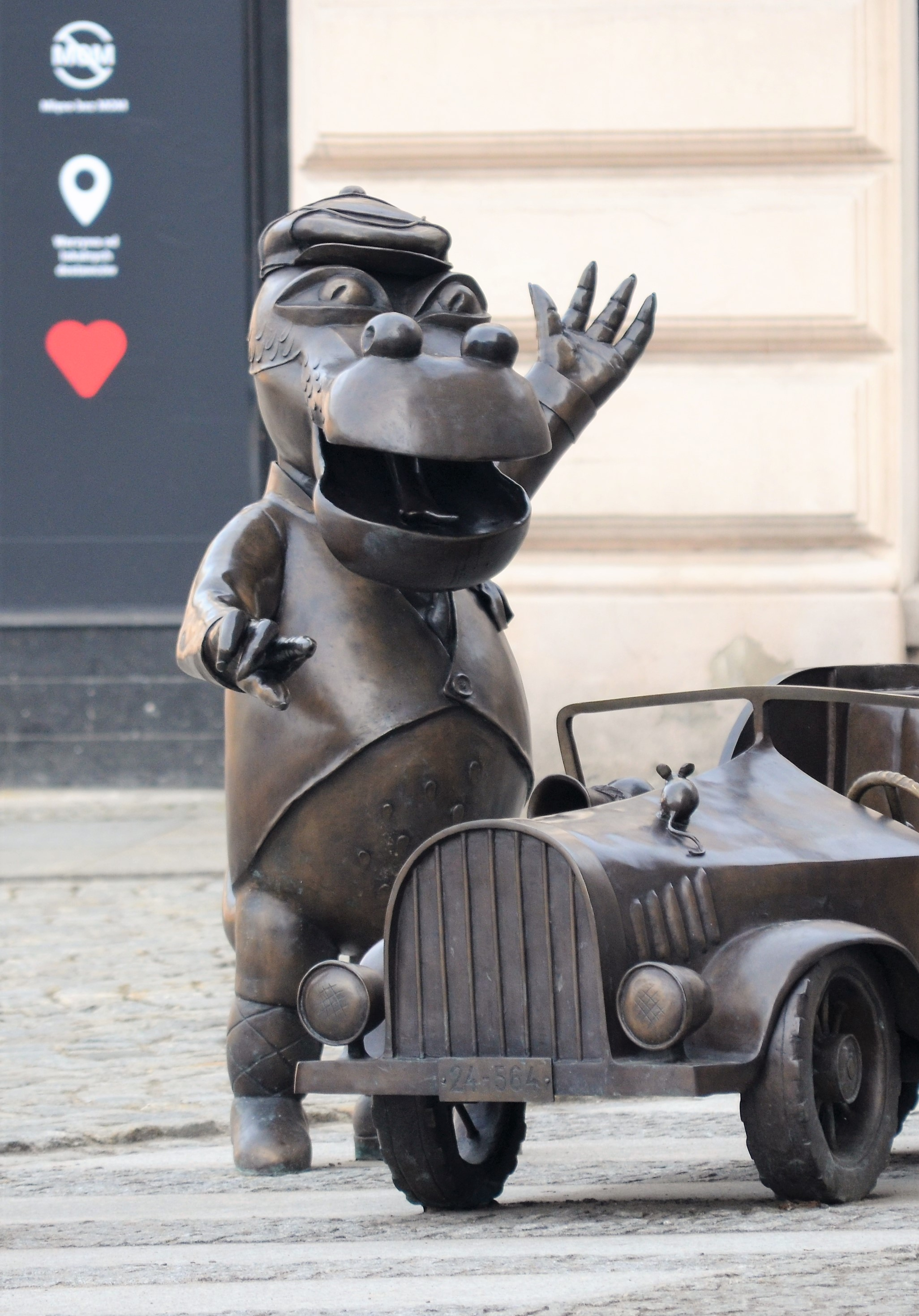
- The sculpture of the main character, Wawel Dragon, in Bielsko-Biała, Poland.
- Genre: Fantasy
- Based on: Porwanie Baltazara Gąbki by Stanisław Pagaczewski
- Written by: Zofia Olak; Leszek Mech
- Directed by: Władysław Nehrebecki; Alfred Ledwig; Edward Wątor; Józef Byrdy; Bronisław Zeman; Wacław Wajser; Stanisław Dülz
- Music by: Tadeusz Kocyba; Otokar Balcy; Alojzy Mol
- Country of origin: Poland
- Original language: Polish
- No. of seasons: 1
- No. of episodes: 13

Production
- Cinematography: Mieczysław Poznański; Dorota Poraniewska
- Running time: 6–7 minutes
- Production company: Studio Filmów Rysunkowych

Original release
- Release: 1969 – 1970

The Abduction of Balthazar Sponge (Polish: Porwanie Baltazara Gąbki) is a Polish-language fantasy animated series produced by Studio Filmów Rysunkowych from 1969 to 1970, that was based on 1965 children's book Porwanie Baltazara Gąbki by Stanisław Pagaczewski. The series had 1 season consisting of 13 episodes, each lasting from 6 to 7 minutes. The episodes were directed by Władysław Nehrebecki, Alfred Ledwig, Edward Wątor, Józef Byrdy, Bronisław Zeman, Wacław Wajser, and Stanisław Dülz, while the scrips were written by Zofia Olak and Leszek Mech. The series had a sequel, Wyprawa profesora Gąbki, that was produced from 1978 to 1980.

== Plot ==
The famous biologist and explorer, Balthazar Sponge (Polish: Baltazar Gąbka), travels to the Land of the Raindwellers (Kraina Deszczowców), in order to study the flying frogs. As he does not return to his country after a long time, Duke Krakus orders to organize the rescue expedition to find him, and bring him back. The expedition was joined by Wawel Dragon (Smok Wawelski) and Bartolini Bartholomew of Green Parsley coat of arms (Bartolini Bartłomiej herbu Zielona Pietruszka), who was the royal chef. They travel from the city of Kraków to the Land of the Raindwellers in their amphibious vehicle. The main characters are followed by Don Pedro de Pommidore, a spy from the Land of the Raindwellers.

== Voice cast ==
- Wiktor Sadecki as the Wawel Dragon
- Roman Stankiewicz as Bartolini Bartholomew
- Jerzy Nowak as Don Pedro

== Episodes ==
No.	Title	Directed by	Original release date
1	"Smok – Expedition"	Władysław Nehrebecki	1969
2	"W zbójeckim obozie"	Alfred Ledwig	1969
3	"Oberża Pod Wesołym Karakonem"	Edward Wątor	1969
3	"Spotkanie ze smokiem Mlekopijem"	Józef Byrdy	1969
4	"W krainie króla Słoneczko"	Edward Wątor	1969
5	"Ucieczka"	Bronisław Zeman	1969
7	"W krainie Bo-Bo"	Wacław Wajser	1970
8	"Przez trzy morza"	Edward Wątor	1970
9	"Przez kraj Deszczowców"	Stanisław Dülz	1970
10	"Zdobycie pałacu"	Stanisław Dülz	1970
11	"Nocna bitwa"	Józef Byrdy	1970
12	"Don Pedro"	Wacław Wajser	1970
13	"Kierunek Kraków"	Stanisław Dülz	1970
