= Statues of Bolek and Lolek =

Monument in Bielsko-Biała, Poland

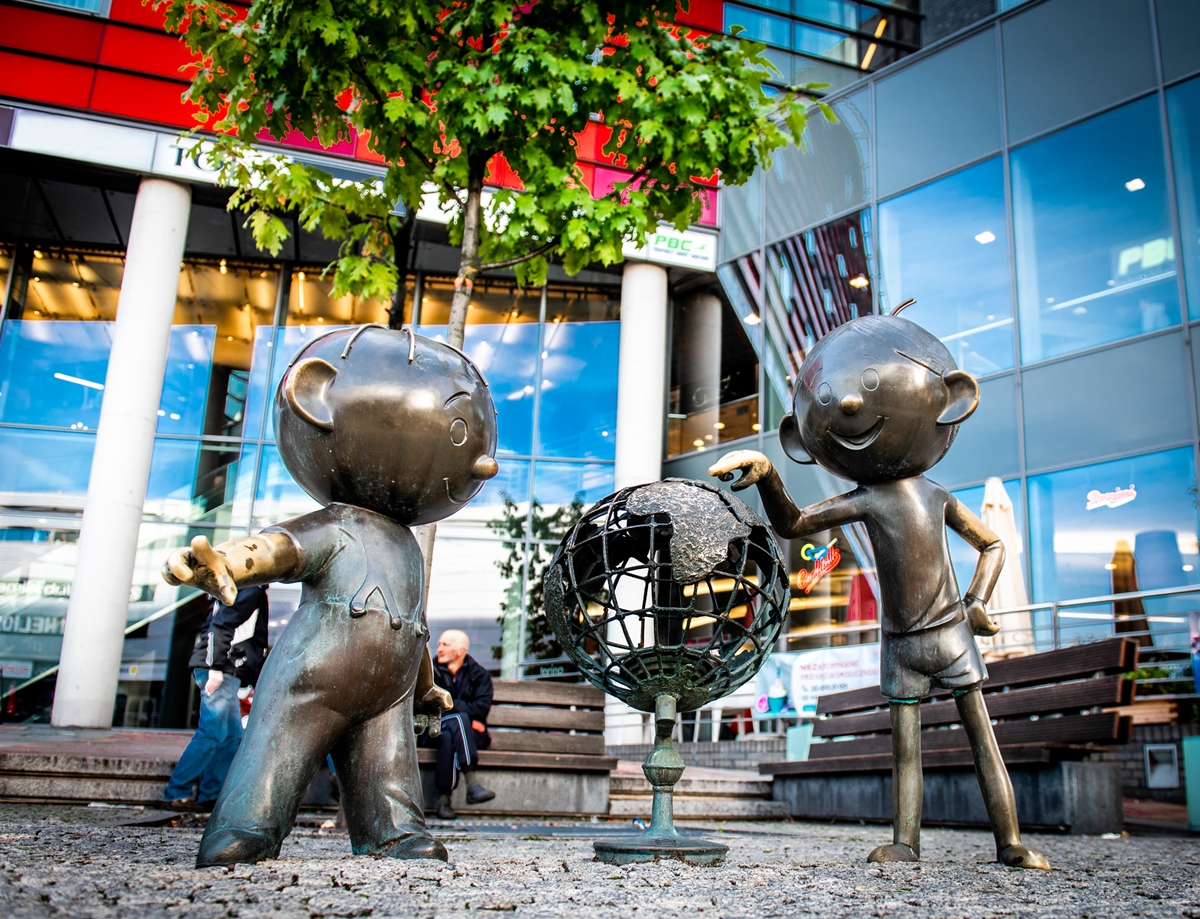
- The monument in 2018.
- Interactive map of Statues of Bolek and Lolek
- Location: Mostowa Street, Bielsko-Biała, Poland
- Coordinates: 49°49′35″N 19°02′55″E
- Designer: Jarosław Mączka
- Type: Statue
- Material: bronze
- Height: 1.4 m (4 ft 7 in)
- Opening date: 19 May 2011
- Dedicated to: Bolek and Lolek

The statues of Bolek and Lolek (Polish: Pomnik Bolka i Lolka) is a monument in Bielsko-Biała, Poland, placed at Mostowa Street next to the Galeria Sfera shopping centre. It consists of two bronze statues dedicated to Bolek and Lolek, two fictional brothers, who are the main characters of the series of children's animated series of the same name, first airing in 1962, and produced in Bielsko-Biała. The monument was designed by Jarosław Mączka, and unveiled on 19 May 2011.

== History ==
The monument was unveiled on 19 May 2011. It was designed by Jarosław Mączka, and the bronze cast was manufactured by Wiesław Wojdak and Magdalena Nowocień.

== Characteristics ==
The sculpture is placed on a small square near Mostowa Street, and near the entrance to the Galeria Sfera shopping centre.

It consists of bronze statues of Bolek and Lolek, two fictional brothers, who are the main characters of the series of children's animated series of the same name, first airing in 1962. They are 1.2 and 1.4-metre-tall respectively, and are standing on two sides of a terrestrial globe. Bolek is pointing with his finger to Bielsko-Biała in Poland, a city where their series were produced.
