= Galeria Sfera =

Mall in Bielsko-Biała, Poland

Coordinates: 49°49′35″N 19°2′55″E

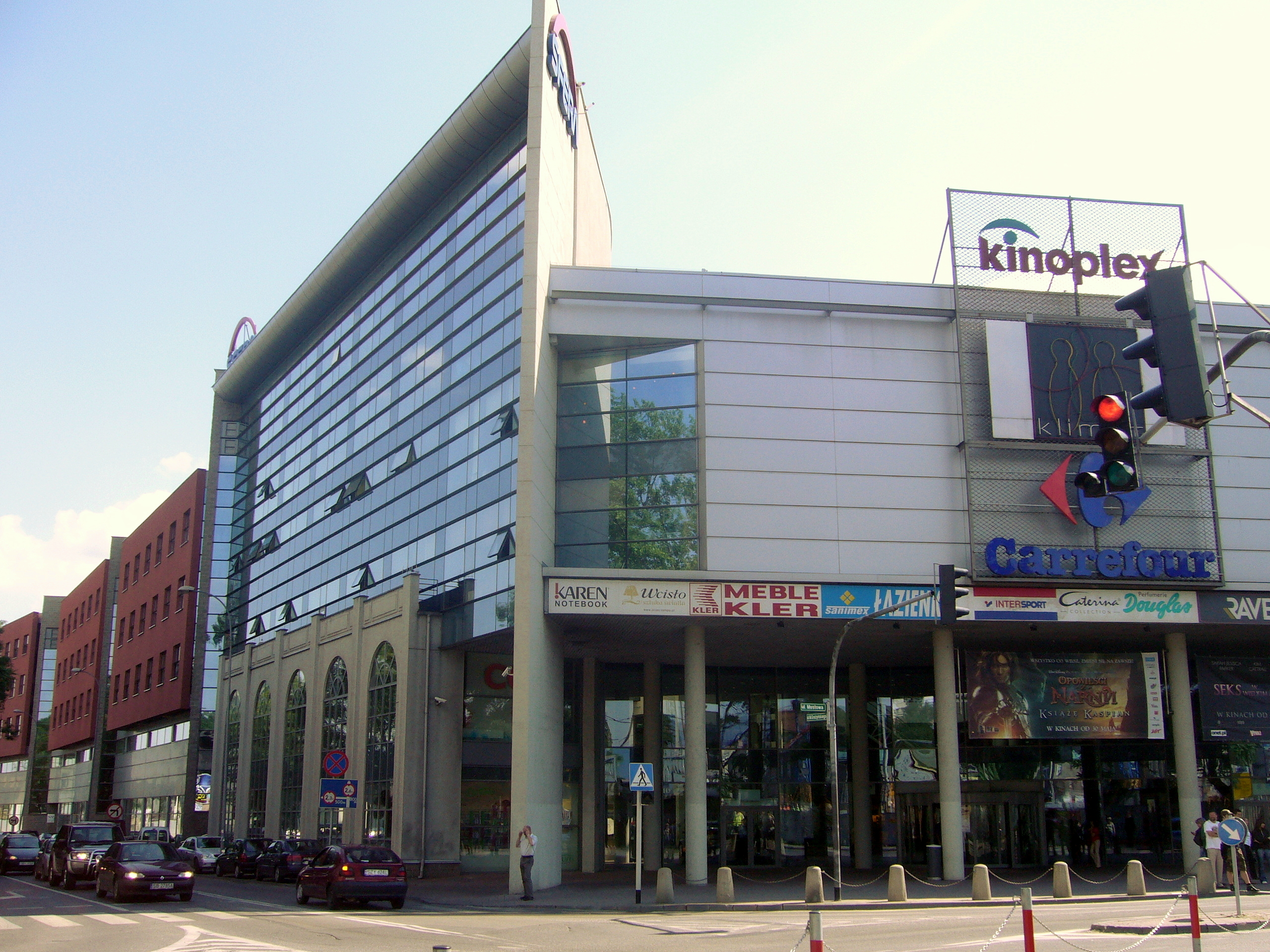
Sfera in Bielsko-Biała

Sfera is the largest mall in Bielsko-Biała, Poland, housing about 120 shops, music club, cinema (Helios) and supermarket. Area: 38000 square meters. The first phase of Sfera was opened on 6 December 2001 at the site of several former textile factories, and in 2009 Sfera was connected with Sfera 2 and the area was enlarged to over 130000 square meters.

In May 2011, a monument to Bolek and Lolek was erected outside the mall.
