= Bolek and Lolek =

Polish children's TV animated characters

- Genre: Buddy comedy Slapstick
- Written by: Władysław Nehrebecki
- Starring: Ewa Złotowska; Danuta Mancewicz; Ilona Kuśmierska; Danuta Przesmycka
- Theme music composer: Waldemar Kazanecki; Tadeusz Kocyba
- Country of origin: Poland
- Original language: Polish
- No. of seasons: 11
- No. of episodes: 174+9 (list of episodes)

Production
- Producer: Studio Filmów Rysunkowych in Bielsko-Biała
- Running time: 9–10 minutes

Original release
- Network: TVP1; Minimax
- Release: 12 August 1962 – 1986

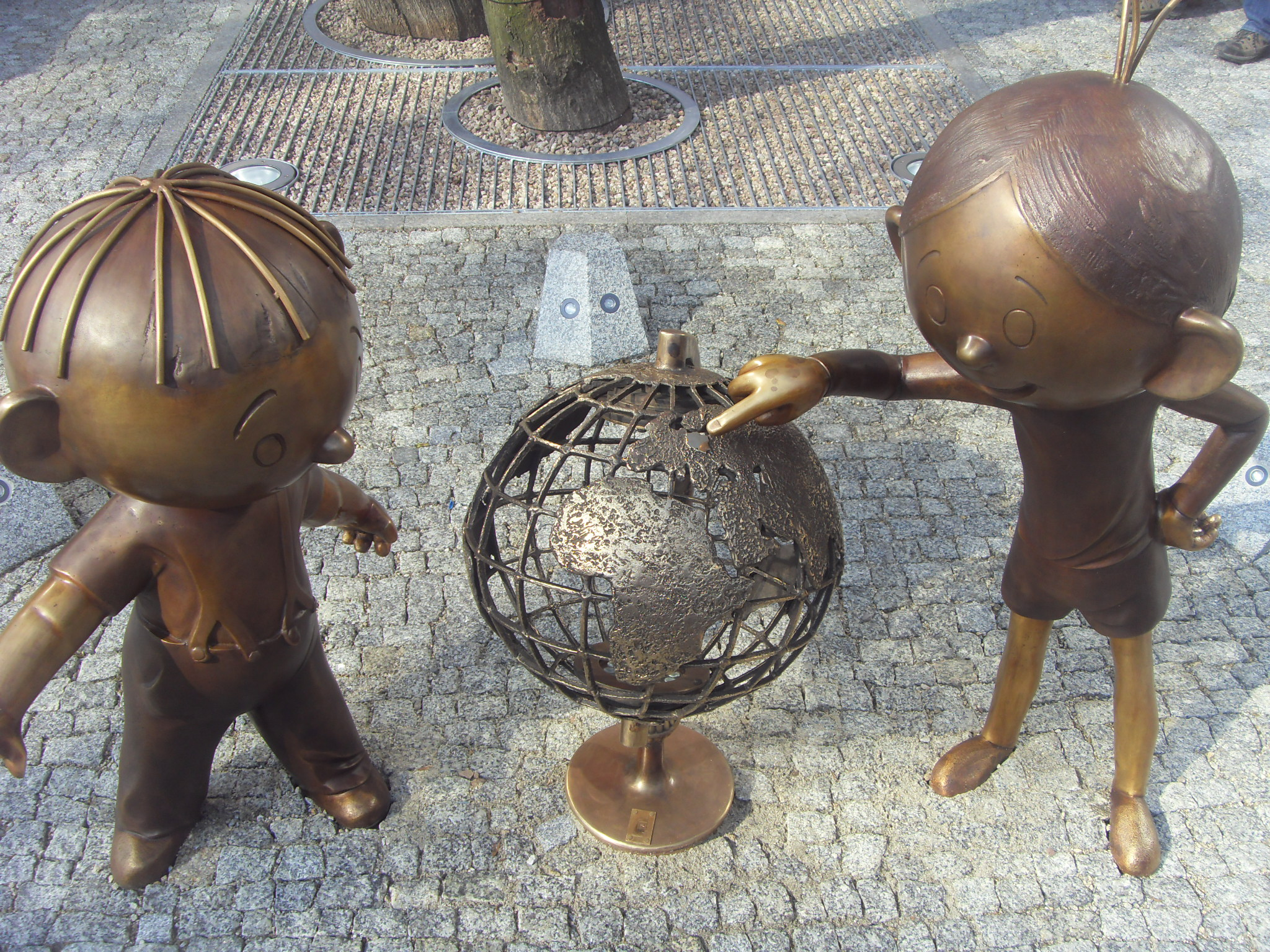
Bolek and Lolek monument in Bielsko-Biała, where the show was produced

Bolek and Lolek (Polish: Bolek i Lolek), also known in English as Benny and Lenny, Jym and Jam and Tim and Tom, are two Polish cartoon characters from the children's animated comedy television series by the same name. The series was created, written and directed by Władysław Nehrebecki and designed by Nehrebecki, Alfred Ledwig and Leszek Lorek. The series is about two friends and their fun (and sometimes silly) adventures which often involve spending a lot of time outdoors.

== History and background ==
The characters were first introduced in 1962. Their names are diminutives of Bolesław and Karol. In English, the cartoon was distributed as Benny & Lenny, Jym and Jam and Tim & Tom. The two boys are friends, as established in the books and screenplays written by the series' creator Władysław Nehrebecki. In 1973, at the requests from female viewers, a girl character by the name of Tola was added. In her first appearance, the episode "Tola", she comes to visit Bolek and Lolek, and from then on she appeared in selected episodes of the series. According to Nehrebecki, Tola was conceived as an equal to the two boys in seeking out adventure and mischief. In total, Tola appeared in 30 episodes.

In a similar vein to The Pink Panther theatrical cartoons, most episodes do not have dialogue. Exceptions are feature-length films and the series from the 1980s, where the main characters' voices were done by: Bolek – Ewa Złotowska, Ilona Kuśmierska; Lolek – Danuta Mancewicz, Danuta Przesmycka.

During the period of the Polish People's Republic, Bolek and Lolek were reproduced in a large quantity of toys: action figures, movies, postcards, online arcades, puzzles, etc., which can be seen in the Museum of Dobranocki (bed-time stories) of the PRL. They are also currently made in computer programmes, colouring books, general picture books and games.

The series was popular in many countries, and was one of the few animated films allowed to be broadcast by Iranian television, along with other popular Polish animated cartoon Reksio, just after the Iranian Revolution of 1979.

In 2011, the Bolek and Lolek Monument was erected in Bielsko-Biała.

== Characters ==
- Bolek (voiced by Ewa Złotowska and Ilona Kuśmierska) - Lolek's big friend.
- Lolek (voiced by Danuta Mancewicz and Danuta Przesmycka) - Bolek's little friend.
- Tola (voiced by Halina Chrobak) - An ordinary girl who lives deep in the forest and has red hair in pigtails. She wears a white shirt, a blue jumper, white socks and black shoes. In her first appearance in the episode "Tola", Tola is leaving the forest and moved to Bolek and Lolek's house and met them for the first time. According to the episode "Zgubiony Ślad", Tola lives in a wooden cottage in the forest. She is a supporting character in the series.

== Telecast and home release ==
In the U.S., some episodes were seen as part of Nickelodeon's Pinwheel from 1977 to 1990, In Canada, the show reran on the French-speaking TVJQ (now Vrak) in the 1980s. For several years, it released videotapes and DVDs. In Catalonia, it was aired on TV3 in Catalan in 1990. It was broadcast in Czechia in 1963 to 2000s as part of Vecernicek cycle. In New Zealand, the series aired on the loose NZBC Television network in 1971.

== Television series ==
=== 1. Bolek i Lolek ===
Bolek and Lolek - 13 Episodes, 1962–1964.

list of episodes
- 01. Kusza – The Crossbow (August 12, 1962)
- 02. Yeti – The Yeti (July 1, 1963)
- 03. Dzielni Kowboje – The Brave Cowboys (July 1, 1963)
- 04. Skrzyżowane Szpady – Crossed Swords (July 1, 1963)
- 05. Pogromca Zwierząt – The Animal Tamer (July 1, 1963)
- 06. Corrida – The Bull Fight (July 1, 1963)
- 07. Indiańskie Trofeum – The Indian Trophy (July 1, 1964)
- 08. Kosmonauci – The Cosmonauts (July 1, 1964)
- 09. Król Puszczy – King of the Forest (July 1, 1964)
- 10. Robinson – Robinson (July 1, 1964)
- 11. Poławiacze Skarbów – The Treasure Seekers (July 1, 1964)
- 12. Sportowcy – The Athletes (July 1, 1964)
- 13. Dwaj Rycerze – The Two Knights (July 1, 1964)

=== 2. Bolek i Lolek na wakacjach ===
Bolek and Lolek on Vacation (named Bolek and Lolek on Holiday in the British English version) - 13 episodes, 1965–1966.

list of episodes
- 01. Lunapark – The Luna Park (named The Funfair in the British English version) (January 1, 1965)
- 02. Grzybobranie – Mushroom Picking (January 8, 1965)
- 03. Strzelba i Wędka – The Gun and the Fishing Rod (January 15, 1965)
- 04. Fałszywy Dziadek – False Grandfather (January 22, 1965)
- 05. Zabawa w Rycerza – Playing Knight (January 29, 1965)
- 06. Na Biwaku – Camping (February 5, 1965)
- 07. Pierwszy Dzień Wakacji – First Day of the Summer Vacation (named First Day of the Summer Holiday in the British English version) (February 12, 1965)
- 08. Kłusownik – The Poacher (February 19, 1965)
- 09. Żyrafa – The Giraffe (February 26, 1965)
- 10. Przygoda w Pustyni – Adventure in the Desert (March 5, 1965)
- 11. Skarb – Treasure (March 12, 1965)
- 12. Autostopowicze – The Hitch-Hikers (March 19, 1965)
- 13. Morska Przygoda – The Sea Adventure (March 26, 1965)

=== 3. Bolek i Lolek wyruszają w świat ===
Bolek and Lolek Travel the World - 18 episodes, 1968–1970.

list of episodes
- 01. W Stepach Australii – The Steppes of Australia (July 1, 1968)
- 02. Na Tropach Bengalskiego Tygrysa – On the Trail of the Bengal Tiger (July 1, 1968)
- 03. Na Wyspach Polinezji – On the Islands of Polynesia (July 1, 1968)
- 04. Złote Miasto Inków – The Golden City of the Incas (July 1, 1968)
- 05. Wyścig Do Bieguna – The Race to the Pole (July 1, 1968)
- 06. W Puszczach Kanady – In the Forests of Canada (July 1, 1968)
- 07. Polowanie Na Goryla – Hunting the Gorilla (July 1, 1969)
- 08. Na Stokach Kilimandżaro – On the Slopes of the Kilimanjaro (July 1, 1969)
- 09. Olimpiada w Mexico – The Olympic Games in Mexico (July 1, 1969)
- 10. W Krainie 1001 Nocy – In the Land of the 1001 Nights (July 1, 1969)
- 11. W Piaskach Gobi – In the Sands of the Gobi (July 1, 1969)
- 12. Gran Premio Argentyny – The Grand Prize of Argentina (July 1, 1969)
- 13. Na Dzikim Zachodzie – In the Wild West (July 1, 1970)
- 14. Grobowiec Faraona – The Tomb of the Pharaoh (July 1, 1970)
- 15. Łowcy Bizonów – The Buffalo Hunters (July 1, 1970)
- 16. Nad Orinoko – On the Orinoco (July 1, 1970)
- 17. Na Tropach Yeti – On the Yeti's Trail (July 1, 1970)
- 18. Przemytnik – The Smuggler (July 1, 1970)

=== 4. Bajki Bolka i Lolka ===
The Tales of Bolek and Lolek - 13 episodes, 1970–1971.

list of episodes
- 01. Złota Rybka – The Golden Fish (November 1, 1970)
- 02. Czerwony Kapturek – The Little Red Riding Hood
- 03. Czarodziejskie Lustro – The Magic Mirror
- 04. Tomcio Paluch – Tom Thumb
- 05. Pantofelek Kopciuszka – Cinderella's Slipper
- 06. Latający Kufer – The Flying Trunk
- 07. Brzydkie Kaczątko – The Ugly Duckling (July 1, 1971)
- 08. Lampa Aladyna – Aladdin's Lamp
- 09. Uwięziona Królewna – The Imprisoned Princess
- 10. Smok – The Dragon
- 11. Baba Jaga – The Witch
- 12. Królowa Śniegu – The Snow Queen
- 13. Zaklęty Zamek – The Enchanted Castle (July 1, 1971)

=== 5. Bolek i Lolek na Dzikim Zachodzie ===
Bolek and Lolek in the Wild West - 7 episodes, 1972.

list of episodes
- 01. Obrońcy Prawa – Defenders of the Law (December 1, 1971)
- 02. Postrach Teksasu – The Texas Terror (January 1, 1972)
- 03. Pościg – In Hot Pursuit
- 04. Porwany Ekspress – The Hijacked Express Train
- 05. Koniokrad – The Horse Thief
- 06. Indiański Bożek – The Indian Idol
- 07. Tropiciele – The Trackers (March 1, 1972)

=== 6. Przygody Bolka i Lolka ===
The Adventures of Bolek and Lolek - 63 episodes, 1972–1980.

list of episodes
- 01. Chory Ząb – A Sick Tooth (July 1, 1972)
- 02. Deszczowe Wakacje – A Rainy Holiday
- 03. Psiaczek – The Puppy
- 04. Tola – Tola
- 05. Biwak – Camp
- 06. Wycieczka w Góry – A Trip to the Mountains
- 07. Nad Jeziorem – On the Lake
- 08. Kruk – The Raven (July 1, 1973)
- 09. W Puszczy – In the Wilderness
- 10. Wycieczka Samochodem – A Trip By Car
- 11. Sierpniowa Wędrówka – An August Journey
- 12. Zimowe Igraszki – Winter Fun
- 13. Zdobywcy Przestworzy – The Conquerors of Space
- 14. Małpka – The Monkey
- 15. Zimowe Zawody – Winter Games (July 1, 1974)
- 16. Śniadanie Na Biwaku – Camping Breakfast
- 17. Imieniny Toli – Tola's Birthday
- 18. Pali Się – Fire
- 19. Tajemnica Toli – Tola's Secret
- 20. Zielone Ścieżki – Green Paths
- 21. Kanarek – The Canary
- 22. Podwodna Wycieczka – An Underwater Tour (July 1, 1975)
- 23. Bieg Na Przełaj – The Race Across the Country
- 24. Wakacje Na Wsi – Vacation in the Countryside (named Holiday in the Countryside in the British English version)
- 25. Tresowany Piesek – The Trained Dog
- 26. Przygoda Na Dwóch Kółkach – Adventure on Two Wheels
- 27. Na Żaglówce – On the Sailing Boat
- 28. Zgubiony Ślad – The Lost Footprint
- 29. Źrebak – The Colt (July 1, 1976)
- 30. Wielki Mecz – The Great Match
- 31. Bocian – The Stork
- 32. Przyjaciele Bobrów – Beavers' Friends
- 33. Wycieczka Kajakiem – The Canoe Trip
- 34. Tajemniczy Plan – Mysterious Plan
- 35. Fotoreporter – Photoreporter
- 36. Zawody Latawców – The Kite Race (July 1, 1977)
- 37. Wagary – Playing Hooky
- 38. Sarenka – The Deer
- 39. Harcerska Warta – A Scout's Watch
- 40. Muzykanci – The Musicians
- 41. Wakacje Nad Morzem – The Seaside Vacation (named The Seaside Holiday in the British English version)
- 42. Mali Ogrodnicy – The Little Gardeners
- 43. Zmylony Trop – The Misleading Track (July 1, 1978)
- 44. Kowboj i Indianie – Cowboy and Indians
- 45. Zabawa w Chowanego – Hide and Seek
- 46. Wakacyjne Szlaki – The Holiday Trails
- 47. Wędrowny Cyrk – The Traveling Circus (named The Travelling Circus in the British English version)
- 48. Wiosenne Porządki – Spring Cleaning
- 49. Pocztowy Gołąb – The Homing Pigeon
- 50. Lotnia – The Hang-Glider (July 1, 1979)
- 51. Morska Wyprawa – The Sea Expedition
- 52. Prima Aprilis – April Fool's Day
- 53. Wiosenna Burza – The Spring Storm
- 54. Byczek – The Bull
- 55. Cygański Wóz – The Gypsie Wagon
- 56. Imieniny Mamy – Mom's Namesday (named Mum's Namesday in the British English version)
- 57. Czarna Bandera – The Black Flag (July 1, 1980)
- 58. Poduszkowiec – The Hovercraft
- 59. Wycieczka z Robotem – Trip with a Robot
- 60. Lolek Lunatyk – Lolek the Sleepwalker
- 61. Lotnicza Przygoda – A Flying Adventure
- 62. Zaginął Piesek – The Lost Dog
- 63. Chrzest Na Równiku – Baptism on the Equator (January 1, 1980)

=== 7. Zabawy Bolka i Lolka ===
Fun with Bolek and Lolek - 7 episodes, 1975–1976.

list of episodes
- 01. Gokarty – Go-Carts (December 1, 1975)
- 02. Niezwykłe Odkrycie – The Incredible Discovery
- 03. Maszeruje Wojsko – The Army Marches On
- 04. Mali Filmowcy – The Little Filmmakers
- 05. Niefortunne Niańki – The Unfortunate Babysitters (January 1, 1976)
- 06. Opiekunowie Zwierząt – The Animal Caregivers (January 1, 1976)
- 07. Czarna Dama – The Black Lady (January 1, 1976)

=== 8. Wielka podróż Bolka i Lolka ===
Bolek and Lolek's Great Journey - 15 episodes, 1978.

list of episodes
- 01. Testament Fileasa Foga – The Last Will of Phileas Fogg (October 14, 1978)
- 02. W Londynie – In London
- 03. Pechowy Statek – The Jinxed Ship
- 04. Wioska 40 Rozbójników – The Village of Forty Bandits
- 05. Małpi Król – The Monkey King
- 06. Syn Wodza Mbu-Bu – The Son of the Chief Mbu-Bu
- 07. Podróż Na Słoniu – Journey on an Elephant
- 08. Tajemnicza Świątynia – The Mysterious Temple
- 09. W Służbie Buddy – In the Service of the Buddha
- 10. Ptak Śmierci – The Bird of Death
- 11. W Głębinach Oceanu – In the Depths of the Ocean
- 12. Rajska Wyspa – Paradise Island
- 13. Dziki Zachód – The Wild West
- 14. Powrót – The Return
- 15. Wyspa Bolka i Lolka – The Bolek and Lolek Island (October 14, 1978)

=== 9. Bolek i Lolek wśród górników ===
Bolek and Lolek Among the Miners - 7 episodes, 1980.

list of episodes
- 01. Wuj Karlik – Uncle Carl (January 1, 1980)
- 02. Zielona Hałda – The Green Heap
- 03. Skarbnik – The Treasurer
- 04. Barbórka – The Baborka Celebration
- 05. Pasowanie Na Górnika – Fit For Mining
- 06. W Starej Kopalni – In the Old Mine
- 07. Czarne Złoto – Black Gold (January 1, 1980)

=== 10. Olimpiada Bolka i Lolka ===
Olympics with Bolek and Lolek - 13 episodes, 1983–1984.

list of episodes
- 01. Tor Przeszkód – The Obstacle Course (December 1, 1983)
- 02. Żółty Czepek – The Yellow Bonnet (December 1, 1983)
- 03. Zawody Łucznicze – Archery Games (December 1, 1983)
- 04. Judo – Judo (December 1, 1983)
- 05. Gol – Goal! (December 1, 1983)
- 06. Żeglarstwo – Sailing (December 1, 1983)
- 07. Slalom – The Slalom (December 1, 1983)
- 08. Skok w Dal – The Long Jump (January 1, 1984)
- 09. Pojedynek – The Duel (January 1, 1984)
- 10. Kolarstwo – Cycling (January 1, 1984)
- 11. Siatkówka – Volleyball (January 1, 1984)
- 12. Igrzyska – The Olympic Games (January 1, 1984)
- 13. Nim Zapłonie Znicz – Before the Torch Is Lit (January 1, 1984)

=== 11. Bolek i Lolek w Europie ===
Bolek and Lolek in Europe - 5 episodes, 1983–1986.

list of episodes
- 01. Duch Zamku Lorda MacIntosha – The Ghost of the Lord MacIntosh's Castle (January 1, 1983)
- 02. W Królestwie Posejdona – In Poseidon's Kingdom (January 1, 1984)
- 03. W Hiszpanii – In Spain (January 1, 1985)
- 04. Wyścig Renów – The Reindeer Race (January 1, 1986)
- 05. Pod Kraterem – Under the Crater (January 1, 1986)

== Films ==
=== Feature films ===
- Wielka podróż Bolka i Lolka – Bolek and Lolek's Great Journey (adapted into the 15-episode series of the same name) – 16 September 1977
- Kawaler Orderu Uśmiechu – The Knight of the Order of the Smile (sequel to "Great Journey") – 1979
- Kosmiczna podróż Bolka i Lolka – The Cosmic Journey of Bolek and Lolek (Returns in 3D) – 2011 ( unreleased due to not enough funds )

=== Episodes edited into films ===
- Bolek i Lolek na Dzikim Zachodzie (Bolek and Lolek in the Wild West) – 5 December 1986
- Sposób na wakacje Bolka i Lolka (How Bolek and Lolek Do Vacations) – 1986
- Bajki Bolka i Lolka (Tales of Bolek and Lolek) – 1986

=== Educational films ===
List of films
- Szerokiej drogi – Godspeed – 1976
- Gdy zapłonie choinka – When the Christmas tree lights up – 1977
- Wystarczy iskierka – Just a Spark – 1977
- Zabawa z zapałkami – Playing With Matches – 1977
- Feralny dzień – Unfortunate Day – 1978
- Jutro będzie lepiej – Tomorrow Will Be Better – 1978
- Na strażackim poligonie – The Fireman Training Grounds – 1978
- Z ogniem nie ma żartów – Fire Is No Laughing Matter– 1978
- Na drodze – On the Road – 1980
