= Reksio =

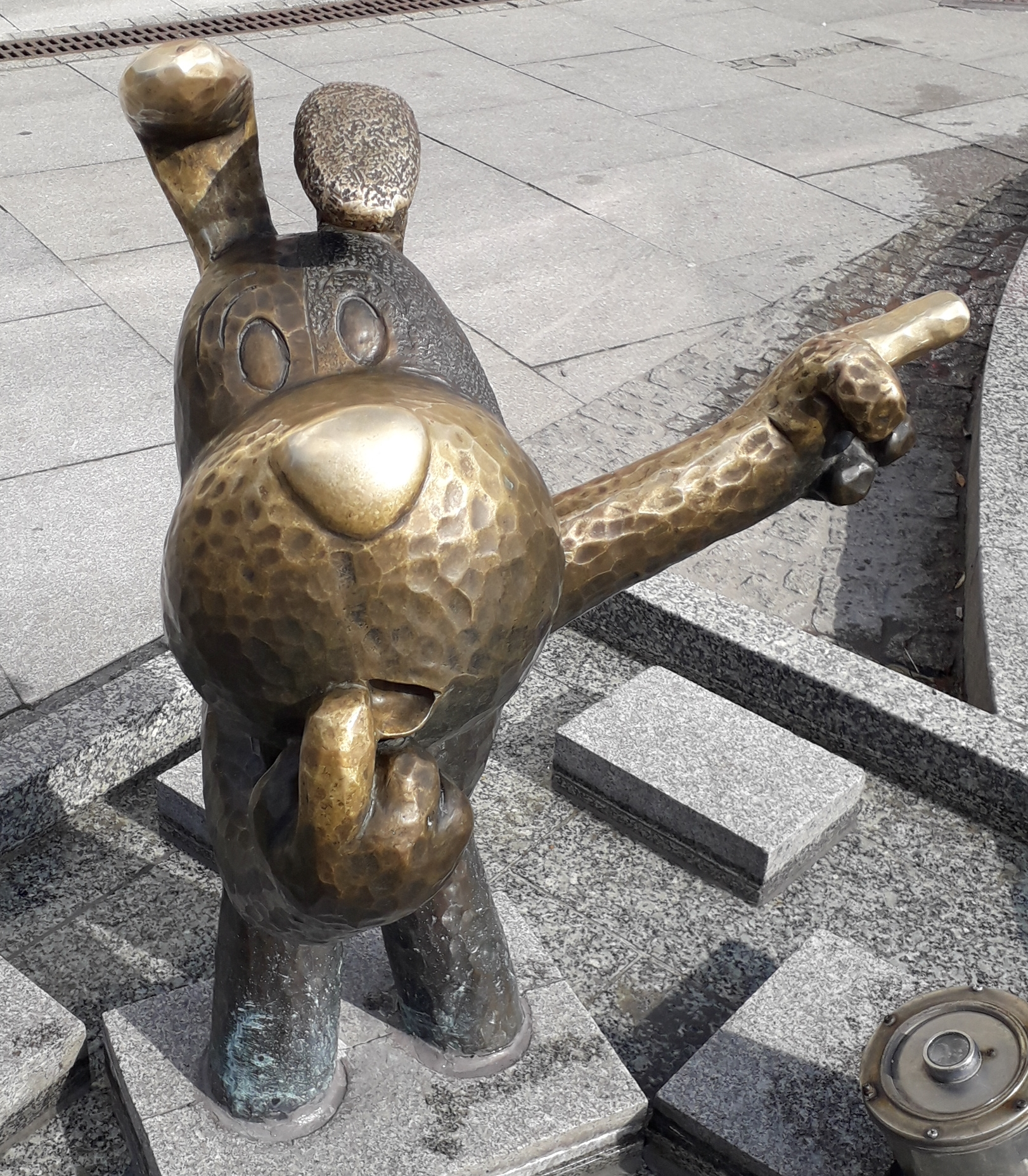
- Statue of Reksio in Bielsko-Biała, southern Poland (August 2018)
- Genre: Comedy, adventure
- Created by: Lechosław Marszałek
- Written by: Lechosław Marszałek
- Theme music composer: Zenon Kowalowski
- Country of origin: Poland
- No. of seasons: 2
- No. of episodes: 65

Production
- Producer: Studio Filmów Rysunkowych
- Running time: 8–10 minutes

Original release
- Network: Telewizja Polska
- Release: 1972 – 1990

Reksio is a Polish animated children's adventure-comedy theatrical and later television series created by Polish director Lechosław Marszałek. Its 65 episodes were designed and produced from 1967 to 1990 in a Polish animated films studio, more specifically in Studio Filmów Rysunkowych (situated in the city of Bielsko-Biała) which also created Bolek and Lolek (there are even cameo appearances of Bolek and Lolek in Reksio). (Note: For example, there is an episode of Reksio in which the two cartoons overlap, in the sense that Reksio is watching Bolek and Lolek on TV along with his owner, a blonde Polish kid, and one of his dog friends.) (Note: At the end of the episode of Bolek and Lolek "Morska wyprawa" at 9:33, when Bolek, Lolek and the sailor are watching TV, they watch a clip where Reksio in a boar suit scares Bolek, then Tola scares Reksio the same way as Reksio did to Bolek.) (Note: In episode 50 of the main series, there is yet another Bolek and Lolek reference which is represented by a book titled with the names of the two characters that Reksio has in his little dog house.)

All episodes describe the adventures of a friendly and courageous piebald terrier dog named Reksio along with his human owners (a middle class Polish family throughout most of the main series) and his animal friends, mostly living in the same courtyard as him, namely hens, cats, or other dogs (and their owners as well). Along with Lolek and Bolek, Reksio has achieved cult status in Poland. Additionally, there is even a crisps brand named after him in Poland. Furthermore, a series of educational, adventure, and puzzle video games for children were also created by Aidem Media from Gdańsk which are based on and star Reksio.

These educational video games were distributed even outside Poland, to other Central European and Eastern European countries (even to Russia) during the early to mid 2000s. In Romania, for example, they were distributed in educational gaming magazines for children by Erc Press. There was an additional second wave of video games developed by Aidem Media throughout the late 2000s and even early 2010s.

In the U.S., it was aired on Disney Channel in 1990 to 1997.

== History ==
The history of Reksio began when the idea of Reksio was first thought of by the creator of the series who was Polish animated film director and screen writer Lechosław Marszałek. The inspiration for the character Reksio came from a female rough-haired fox terrier dog named Trola. She belonged to the creator, main producer, and writer of the series. The first episode of the series, Reksio poliglota, which was produced by Lechosław Marszałek and Studio Filmów Rysunkowych released in 1967 in theaters as part of children's matinees. This episode had poorer graphics and set design compared to the episodes that would be later produced throughout the 1970s. In addition, Reksio also looked different, sporting a collar that he did not wear in later episodes. While a noticeable improvement in terms of graphics can be clearly seen throughout the late 1960s, it was later during the early 1970s (more specifically in 1972) that the animated series would significantly evolve, also with a better intro with its own music theme.

All episodes that were produced until 1971 were produced by Lechosław Marszałek. In total, Marszałek directed 19 episodes and co-directed 1 episode, the most of any other director involved in the production of the animated series. Almost all of the episodes of the animated series can be watched on YouTube on the official channel of Studio Filmów Rysunkowych. The years 1972 and 1974 were the most productive ones for the main series, throughout which 7 new episodes were produced and released during each year. Each episode ends with 'Koniec' (which is Polish for '(The) End').

== Media appearances ==
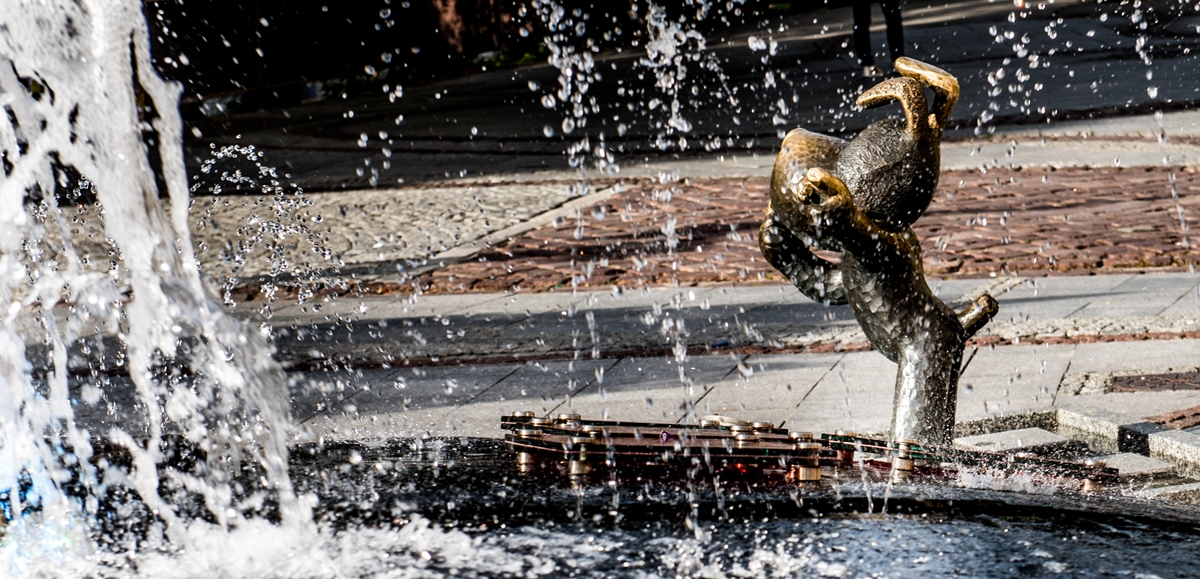
Reksio's statue in the city of Bielsko-Biała, Silesian Voivodeship, southern Poland (November 2018)

The character of Reksio has appeared not only in television, but also in various computer games, as statue or mascot, and other related media. These include the following:

- A "Reksio" television series consisting of 65 episodes.
- A series of educational video games that star the character of Reksio which was produced by Aidem Media in Poland. This series of educational video games had also been exported to other countries in Central and Eastern Europe, such as in Romania, where they have been distributed by Erc Press.
- A series of adventure and puzzle games produced by Aidem Media that star Reksio. These games include the "City of Secrets" series.
- A bronze statue of Reksio situated in a square named "Plac Reksia" located in the Polish city of Bielsko-Biała. Reksio is pointing towards a fountain next to the statue.

=== Video games ===
Over time, there have been various video games developed and released by Aidem Media starring Reksio (for both PC and iOS). They are the following ones:

- Liczę z Reksiem/I Count with Reksio (educational puzzle game) - 2001
- Abc z Reksiem/ABC with Reksio (educational puzzle game) - 2001
- Reksio i Skarb Piratów/Reksio and the Pirates' Island (adventure game) - 2003
- Wesołe przedszkole Reksia/The Merry Kindergarten of Reksio (educational puzzle game) - 2003
- Reksio i UFO/Reksio and the UFO (adventure game) - 2003
- Reksio i ortografia/Reksio and spelling (educational puzzle game) - 2003
- Reksio i Czarodzieje/Reksio and the wizards (adventure game) - 2004
- Reksio i Wehikuł Czasu/Reksio and the Time Machine (adventure game) - 2004
- Reksio i kapitan Nemo/Reksio and Captain Nemo (adventure game) - 2006
- Reksio i Kretes w Akcji!/Reksio and Kretes in action! (arcade game) - 2007
- Reksio i Kretes: Tajemnica Trzeciego Wymiaru/Reksio and Kretes - The Mystery of the Third Dimension (arcade game) - 2007
- Łamigłówki Reksia: Wielki Odkrywca/Reksio's puzzles: great explorer (puzzle game) - 2008
- Reksio i Miasto Sekretów/Reksio and the City of Secrets (adventure game) - 2009 for PC and 2011/2012 for iOS

== Full list of episodes ==
№	Year of production	Original title in Polish	English title	Director
Main series (Note: Seria: Reksio is the original title of the series in Polish) (1967–1986)
1	1967	Reksio poliglota	Reksio Polyglot	Lechosław Marszałek
2	1969	Reksio marzyciel	Reksio is a dreamer	Lechosław Marszałek
3	1969	Reksio wychowawca	Reksio the Educator	Lechosław Marszałek
4	1970	Reksio obrońca	Reksio the Defender	Lechosław Marszałek
5	1970	Reksio dobroczyńca	Reksio the Benefactor	Lechosław Marszałek
6	1971	Reksio domator	Reksio as a Homebody	Lechosław Marszałek
7	1972	Reksio strażak	Reksio the Fireman	Józef Ćwiertnia
8	1972	Reksio sportowiec	Reksio, an Athlete	Edward Wątor
9	1972	Reksio taternik	Reksio, a Mountaineer	Lechosław Marszałek
10	1972	Reksio wędrowiec	Reksio the Wanderer	Józef Ćwiertnia
11	1972	Reksio aktor	Reksio the Actor	Józef Ćwiertnia
12	1972	Reksio telewidz	Reksio watches TV	Edward Wątor
13	1972	Reksio kosmonauta	Reksio the Astronaut	Lechosław Marszałek
14	1973	Reksio magik	Reksio the Magician	Edward Wątor
15	1973	Reksio pielęgniarz	Reksio the Nurse	Lechosław Marszałek
16	1973	Reksio racjonalizator	Reksio's Busy Day	Edward Wątor
17	1973	Reksio rozbitek	Reksio, a survivor	Lechosław Marszałek
18	1973	Reksio malarz	Reksio the Painter	Marian Cholerek
19	1973	Reksio poszukiwacz	Reksio the Seeker	Edward Wątor
20	1974	Reksio ratownik	Reksio the Rescuer	Józef Ćwiertnia
21	1974	Reksio detektyw	Reksio the Detective	Marian Cholerek
22	1974	Reksio czyścioch	Reksio gets Fleas	Józef Ćwiertnia
23	1974	Reksio pogromca	Reksio the Tamer	Marian Cholerek
24	1974	Reksio żeglarz	Reksio the Sailor	Józef Ćwiertnia
25	1974	Reksio medalista	Reksio and the Dog Show	Marian Cholerek
26	1974	Reksio rozjemca	Reksio the Peacemaker	Józef Ćwiertnia
27	1975	Reksio Robinson	Reksio the Robinson	Józef Ćwiertnia
28	1975	Reksio pocieszyciel	Reksio, the Comforter	Romuald Kłys, Edward Wątor
29	1975	Reksio śpiewak	Reksio the Singer	Lechosław Marszałek
30	1975	Reksio swat	Reksio the Matchmaker	Józef Ćwiertnia
31	1976	Reksio dentysta	Reksio the Dentist	Józef Ćwiertnia
32	1976	Reksio sadownik	Reksio the Orchardist	Lechosław Marszałek
33	1976	Reksio kompan	Reksio, companion	Lechosław Marszałek
34	1977	Reksio nauczyciel	Reksio the Teacher	Edward Wątor
35	1977	Reksio wybawca	Reksio the Savior	Romuald Kłys
36	1977	Reksio przewodnik	Reksio the Guide	Lechosław Marszałek
37	1978	Reksio gospodarz	Reksio the Host	Józef Ćwiertnia
38	1978	Reksio i jamnik	Reksio and the Dachshund	Lechosław Marszałek
39	1979	Reksiowa jesień	Reksio's Autumn	Józef Ćwiertnia
40	1979	Reksio i UFO	Reksio and the U.F.O.	Lechosław Marszałek
41	1979	Reksio terapeuta	Reksio the Therapist	Lechosław Marszałek
42	1979	Reksio kompozytor	Reksio, composer	Józef Ćwiertnia
43	1980	Reksio remontuje	Reksio Renovates	Lechosław Marszałek
44	1980	Reksiowa wiosna	Reksio's Spring	Józef Ćwiertnia
45	1981	Reksio i nośna kura	Reksio and the Carrying Hen	Halina Filek-Marszałek
46	1981	Reksio łyżwiarz	Reksio, the Skater	Józef Ćwiertnia
47	1981	Reksiowa zima	Reksio's Winter	Romuald Kłys
48	1981	Reksio i wrona	Reksio and the Crow	Halina Filek-Marszałek
49	1981	Reksio i koguty	Reksio and the Rooster	Józef Ćwiertnia
50	1982	Reksio i świerszcz	Reksio and the Cricket	Halina Filek-Marszałek
51	1985	Reksio i sroka	Reksio and the Magpie	Romuald Kłys
52	1986	Reksio i mrówki	Reksio and the Ants	Romuald Kłys
Reksio and the Birds series (Note: Reksio i ptaki is the original title of the series in Polish) (1987–1990)
53	1987	Reksio i bocian	Reksio and the Stork	Romuald Kłys
54	1987	Reksio i papuga	Reksio and the Parrot	Ryszard Lepióra
55	1987	Reksio i gołąb	Reksio and the Pigeon	Ryszard Lepióra
56	1987	Reksio i szpaki	Reksio and the Starlings	Ryszard Lepióra
57	1987	Reksio i gąsior	Reksio and the Gander	Ryszard Lepióra
58	1988	Reksio i drozd	Reksio and the Thrush	Ryszard Lepióra
59	1988	Reksio i dzięcioł	Reksio and the Woodpecker	Ryszard Lepióra, Lechosław Marszałek
60	1988	Reksio i kruk	Reksio and the Raven	Lechosław Marszałek
61	1989	Reksio i kawki	Reksio and the Jackdaws	Ryszard Lepióra
62	1990	Reksio i kukułka	Reksio and the Cuckoo	Ryszard Lepióra
63	1990	Reksio i paw	Reksio and the Peacock	Ryszard Lepióra
64	1990	Reksio i pelikan	Reksio and the Pelican	Andrzej Flettner
65	1990	Reksio i sowa	Reksio and the Owl	Andrzej Flettner

== Reksio's profile as main character ==
As the main character of his own series, Reksio is clearly the protagonist. Throughout the main series, he is depicted as a responsible, dutiful, loving, caring, and respectful dog to both his owner, a blonde Polish kid, as well as to his family and the other animals with which he lives in the same courtyard. Sometimes though, he is a little bit mischievous and short-tempered (but only in rare contexts) with his older owners or other humans with whom he interacts. In addition, Reksio also has a special bond with a female dog with red-haired ears. His owner is almost always good or very good to him.

Most of the time, however, he is portrayed as a saviour, helper, rescuer, and peacemaker (and occasionally as a wanderer across the neighbourhood or his home town). In these regards, he is seen protecting the hens in his courtyard against foxes who want to steal their eggs as well as managing or peacefully settling conflicts between other animals who live in the same courtyard with him. He is courageous enough to even save or aid some humans in some dangerous situations as well, most notably his young owner, a blonde Polish kid, from gas intoxication in his kitchen in one episode.

Yet his help is not only limited to his young owner or the animals in his courtyard, as in the second series, more specifically in Reksio and the birds series, Reksio can be seen as an empathetic saviour for a stork and a cuckoo (originally 'pigeon' in the title of that episode), outside animals/birds. While he is mostly friendly towards all animals living in the same courtyard as him, Reksio has occasional skirmishes or quarrels with the rooster (more specifically throughout the main series). In addition, several times during the Reksio and birds series, Reksio has occasional problems or scuffles with the gander living in his courtyard as well. Last but not least, he is a great friend to the owl who shares with him music that relaxes him. Furthermore, the owl eventually convinces him not to leave the courtyard at the end of the second series.

== Gallery ==
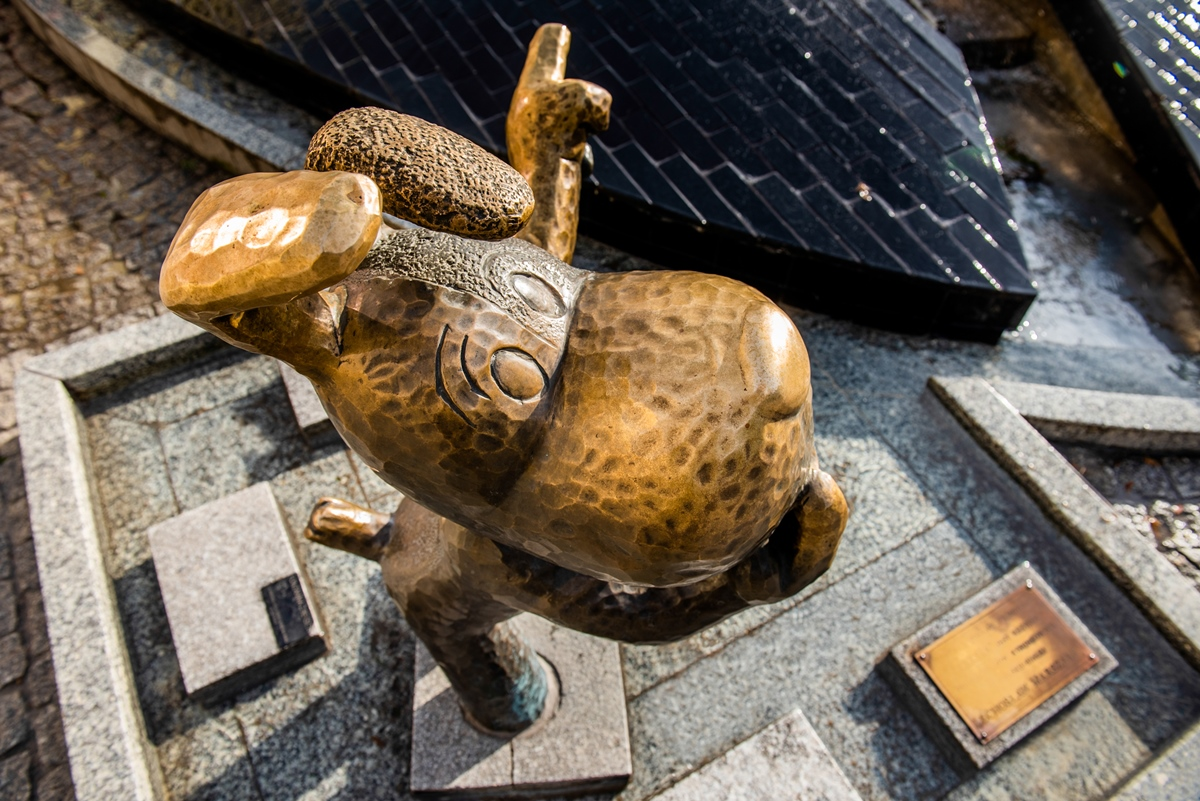
Reksio's statue in Bielsko-Biała (November 2018)

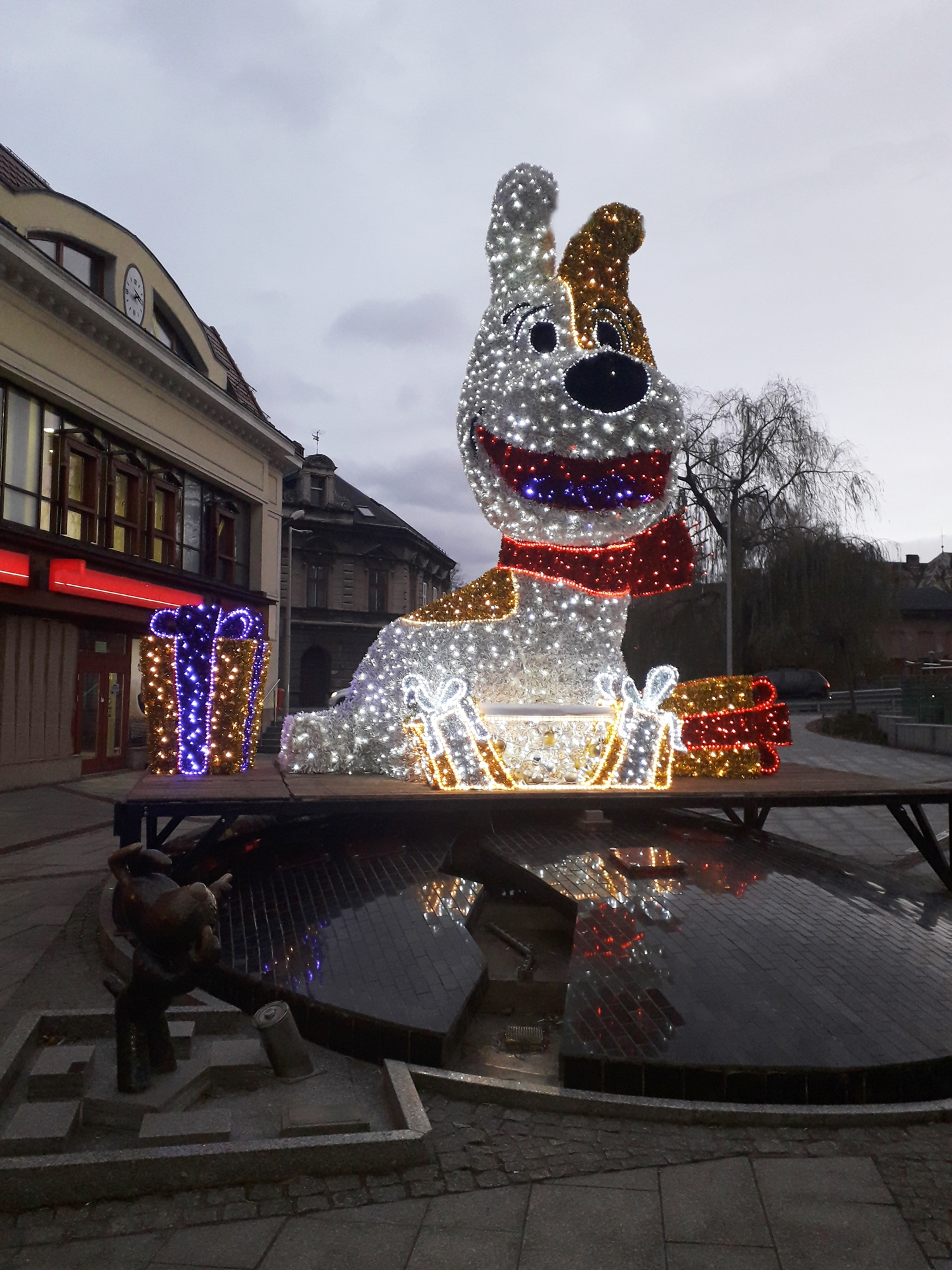
An illuminated, bigger Christmas statue for Reksio in his native Bielsko-Biała (December 2018)

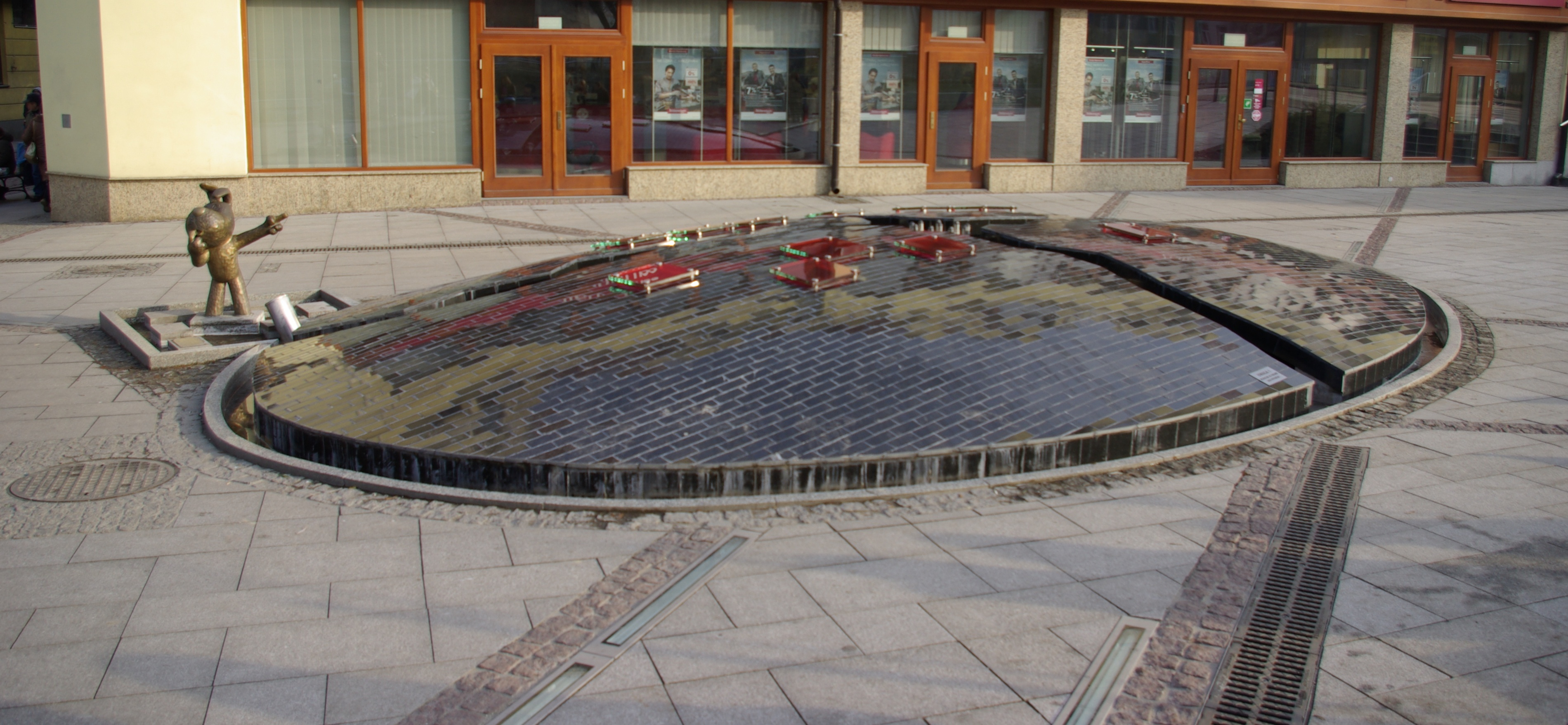
Reksio's statue in Bielsko-Biała (November 2009)

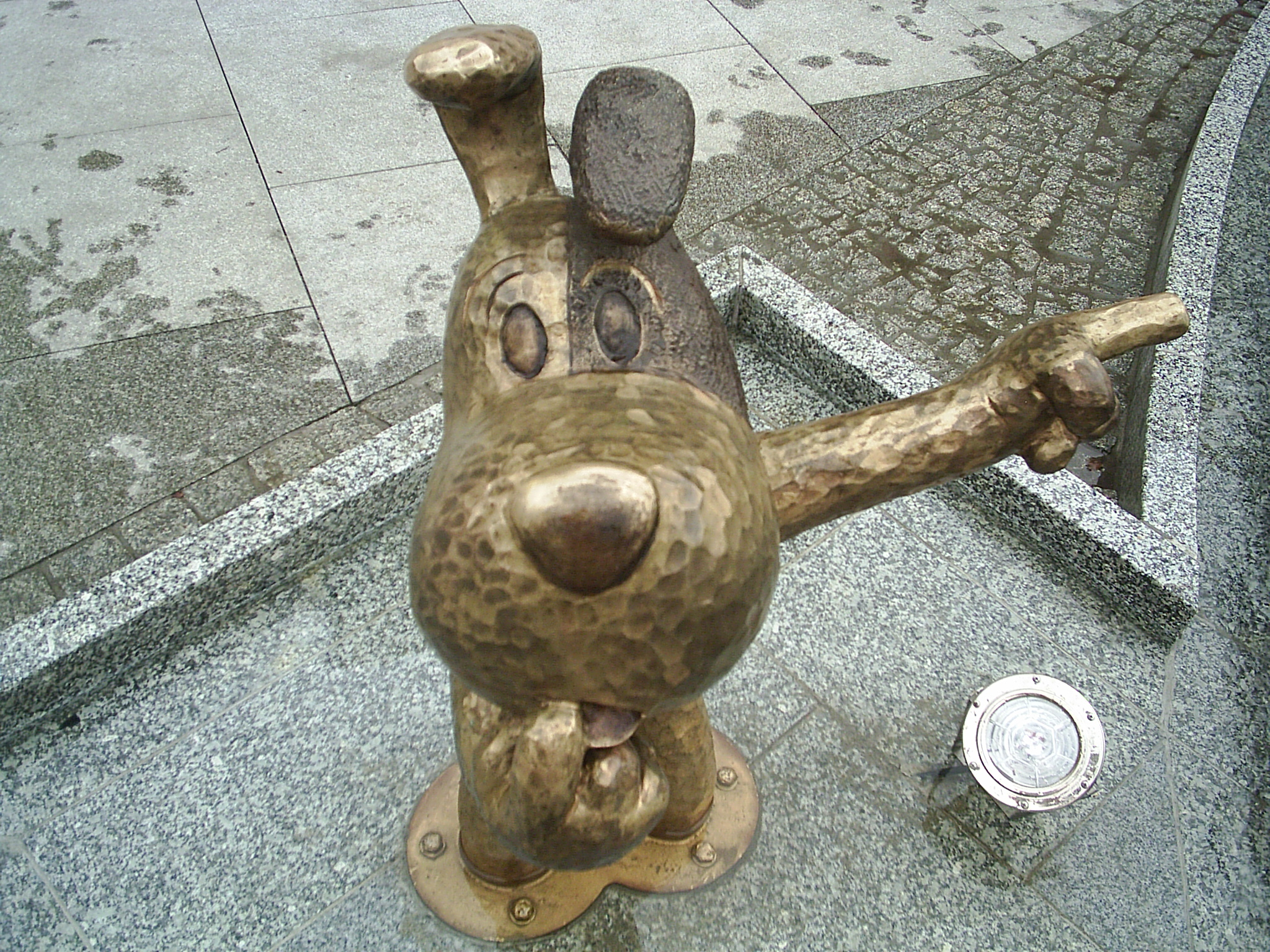
Reksio's statue in Bielsko-Biała (August 2009)

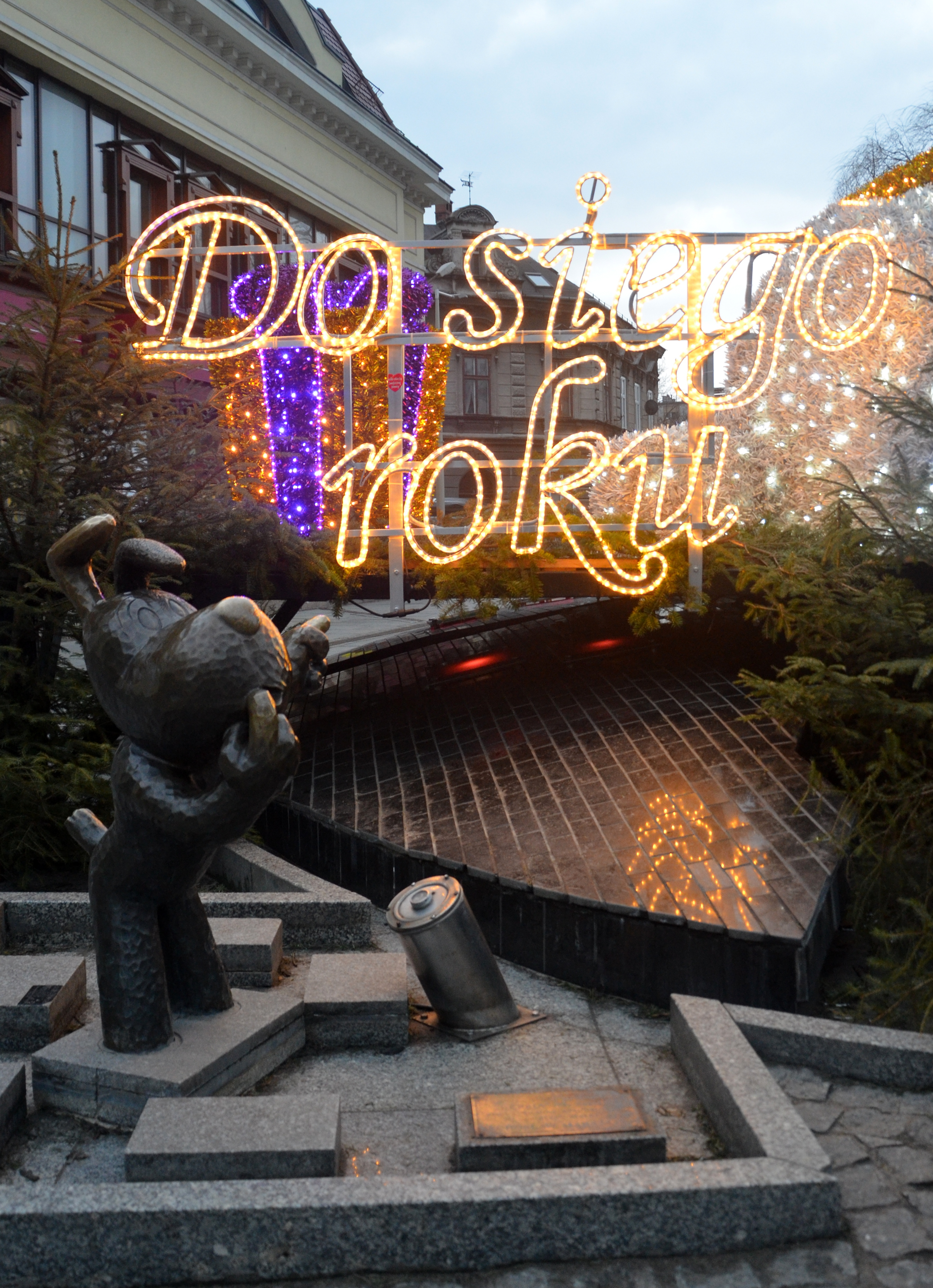
Reksio's statue in Bielsko-Biała (January 2018)

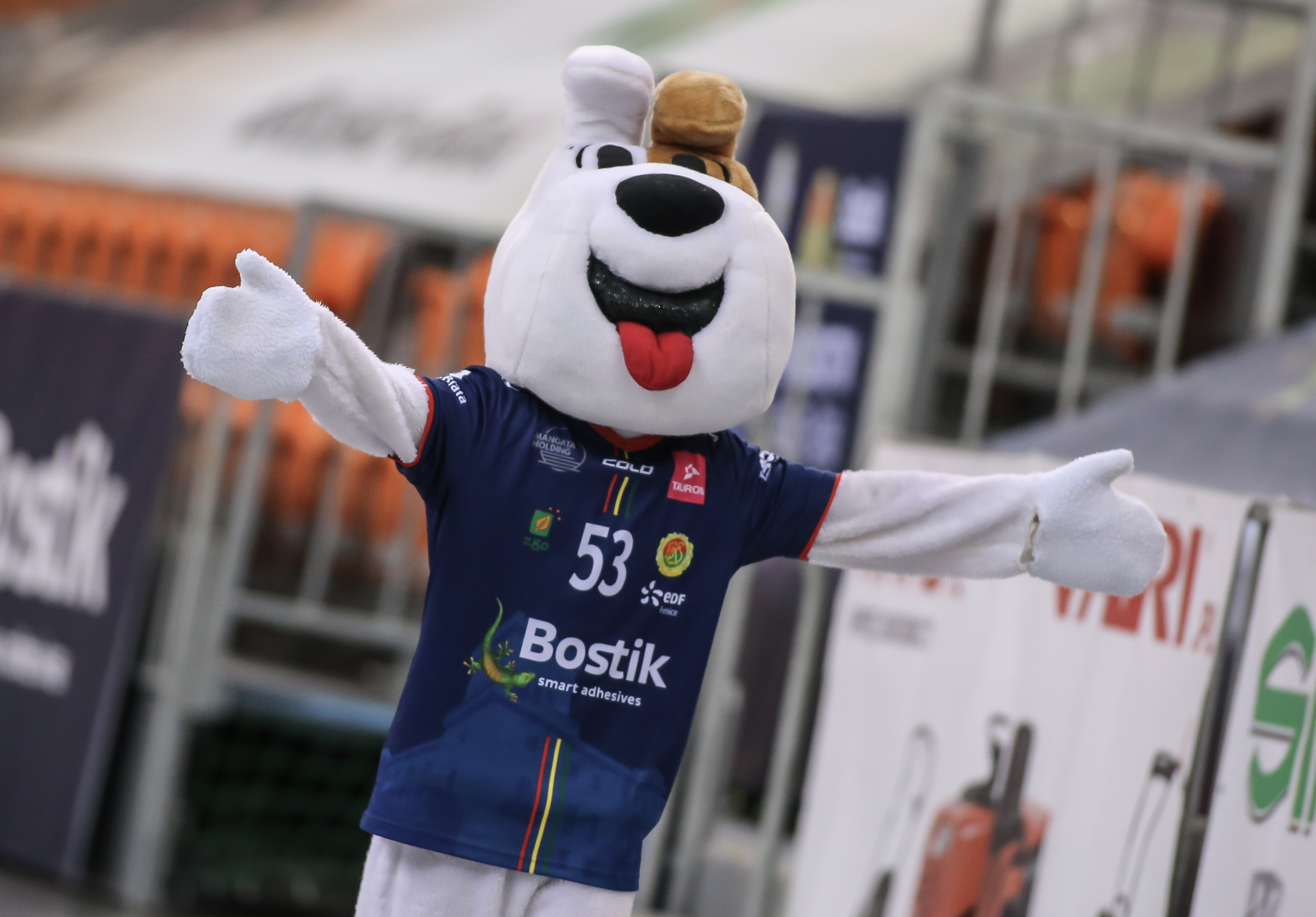
Reksio as the official mascot of BKS Stal Bielsko-Biała
