= Lechosław Marszałek =

Polish animated film director and script writer

Lechosław Marszałek (9 March 1922 – 26 March 1991) was a Polish animated film director and script writer. He is best known as the creator of Reksio; he was also involved with the Bolek i Lolek cartoons. For many years he was involved with the Studio Filmów Rysunkowych. He has been called "one of Poland's greatest pioneers of animation."
