= Władysław Nehrebecki =

Polish animator and cartoon director

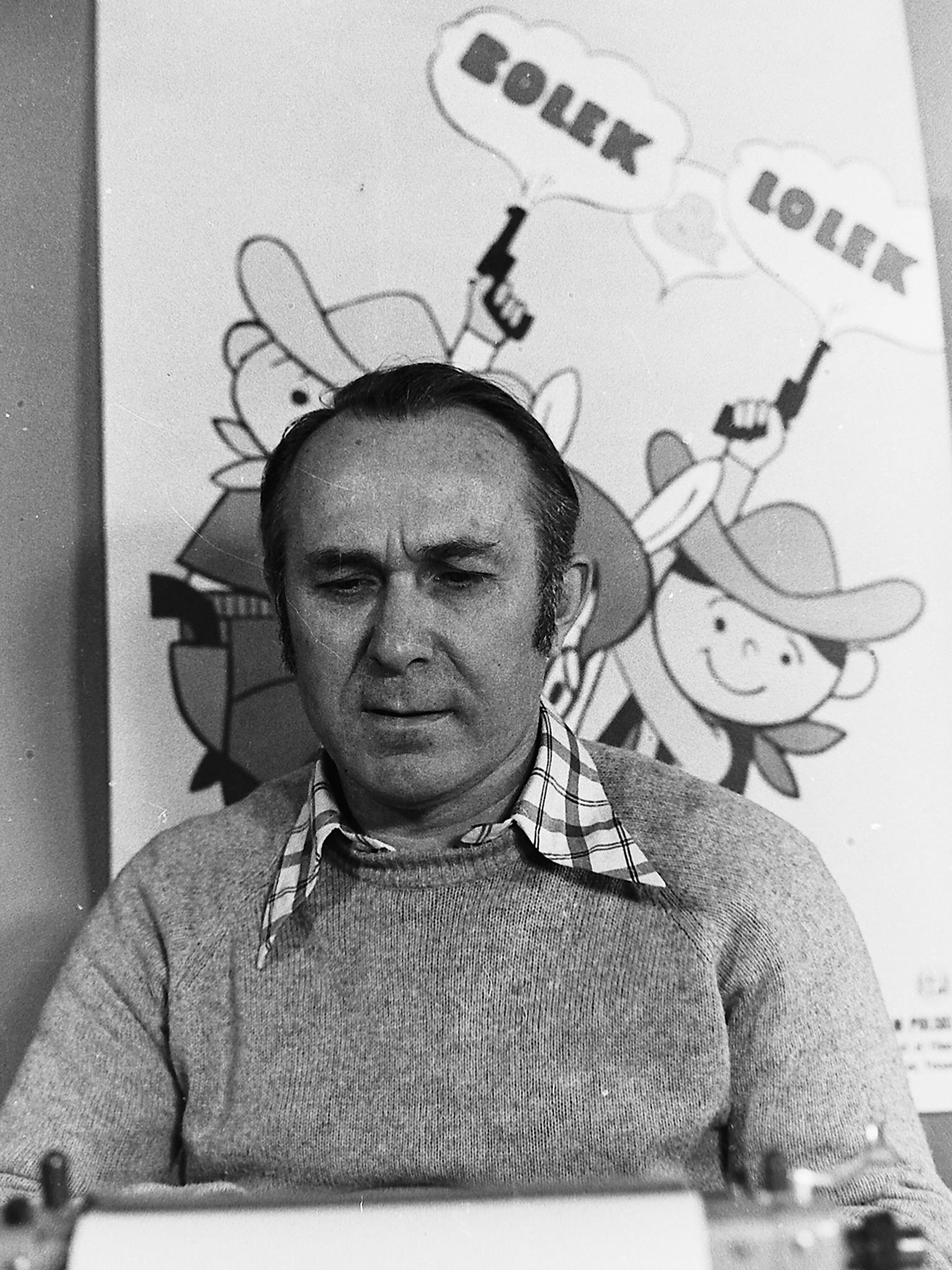
- Nehrebecki in 1972
- Born: June 14, 1923; Borysław
- Died: 28 December 1978 (aged 55); Katowice
- Resting place: Bielsko-Biała
- Occupations: Animator, cartoon director
- Awards: Order of Polonia Restituta, Cross of Merit, Meritorious Activist of Culture, Order of the Smile

Władysław Nehrebecki (14 June 1923, Borysław, Poland (now Boryslav, Ukraine) – 28 December 1978, Katowice) was a Polish animator and cartoon director. He is best known as the creator of the animated characters Bolek and Lolek. Bolek and Lolek are Władysław Nehrebecki's sons, and Lolek (in real life Roman Nehrebecki) is one of the owners of copyright and he recreated the cartoon series in a comic book Bolek's and Lolek's Cousins' Adventures (Przygody kuzynów Bolka i Lolka). Only one comic book was created and was released in August 2002.

== Biography ==
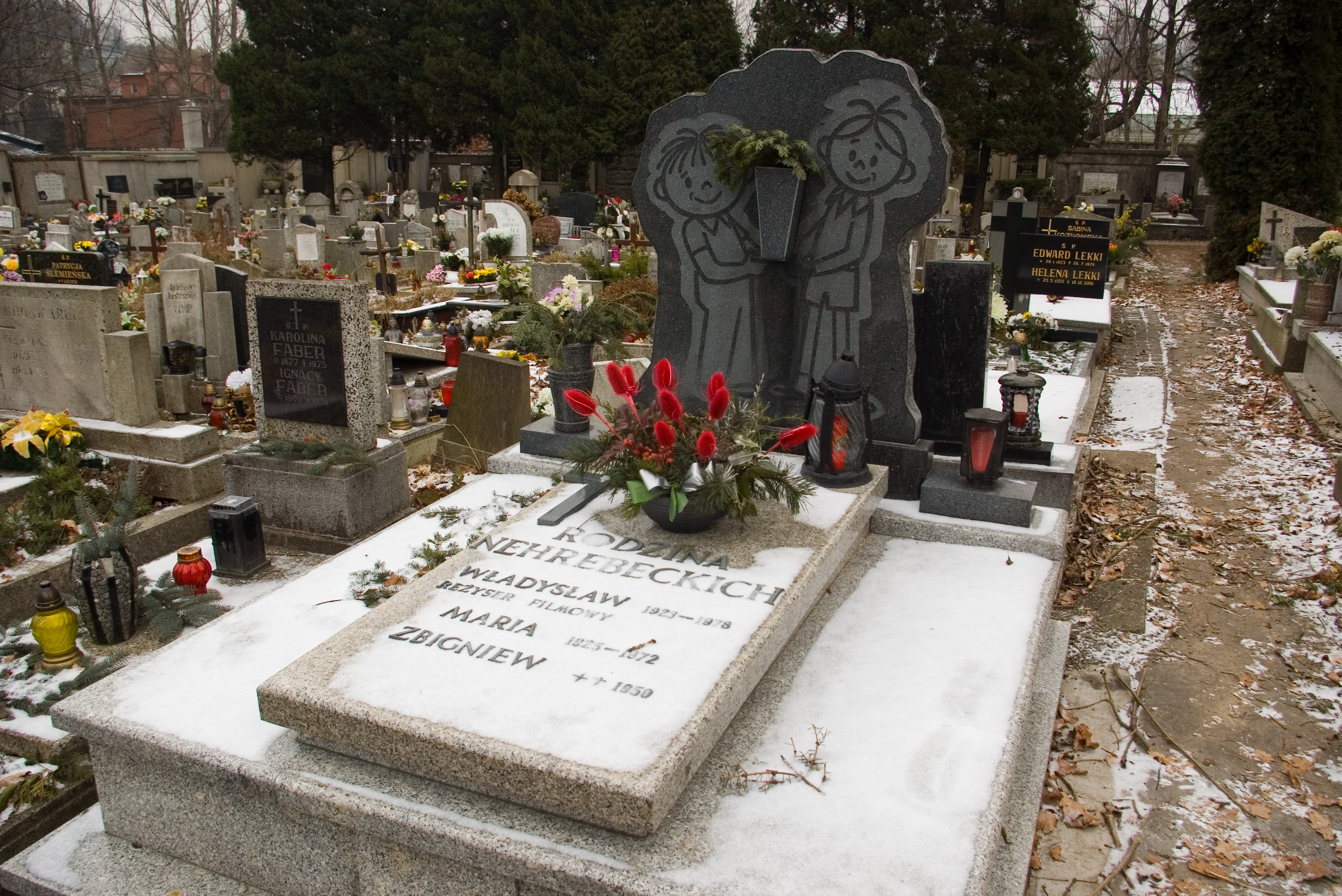
Nehrebecki's grave in Bielsko-Biała

Władysław Nehrebecki was born on June 14, 1923 in Borysław, the son of Józef and Helena née Dudziak. At the age of six, he was sent to the Institute for Orphans and the Poor of Count Stanisław Skarbek's Foundation in Drohowyż. He spent 10 years there. After returning from the Institute, he settled with his family in Drohobycz, where he began his education at the Secondary Technical School of the Society of the Secondary Technical School. After the German attack on the Soviet Union, in 1941 he was deported to Germany. He worked in the extraction of crude oil for Wintershall AG in the small town of Nienhagen as a forced laborer. He stayed there until the end of World War II. The last preserved document from the period of forced labor in the ITS Arolsen Archives is dated April 4, 1945.

At the end of 1949, the Film Studio was transformed into the "Śląsk" Animated Film Production Team, based in Wisła and later in Bielsko-Biała. In the Bielsko team, he made two animated films, Czy to był sen and Ich szlak, as an animator and assistant director. In 1949, he made his debut as a director of the animated film A1. In 1949–1950, he co-made further films: Wilk i niedźwiadki directed by Wacław Wajzer (animation) and O nowe jutro directed by Leszek Lorek (animation). In 1951, he was entrusted with the task of organizing the Animated Film Department in Łódź (later Se-ma-for). That year, he made the film Opowiadał dzięcioł sowie in Łódź.

In 1952 he returned to Bielsko, where he made the films Przygody Gucia Penguina and Kimsobo podróżnik. He focused primarily on works dedicated to children. He participated in the production of about 300 Polish animated films as an author, co-author or consultant. In 1962, Nehrebecki, temporarily serving as director of the Animated Film Studio, approached television with the initiative to produce a film series and prepared a short story for the first episode of "Bolek i Lolek" and "Przygody Błękitnego Rycerzyka". From 1963, both series were created in the Bielsko studio. In December 1963, Nehrebecki resigned from the position of studio director and took over the authorial supervision of the "Bolek i Lolek" series. From then on, he consulted and supervised all films featuring Bolek i Lolek. He held this position until his death in 1978.
