= Stanisław Pagaczewski =

Polish journalist and writer

Stanisław Pagaczewski (1916-1984) was a Polish journalist and writer, best known for children literature, including the trilogy about Baltazar Gąbka.
