= Studio Filmów Rysunkowych =

Animation studio in Bielsko-Biała, Poland

ANIMATED FILM STUDIO (STUDIO FILMÓW RYSUNKOWYCH) IN BIELSKO-BIAŁA
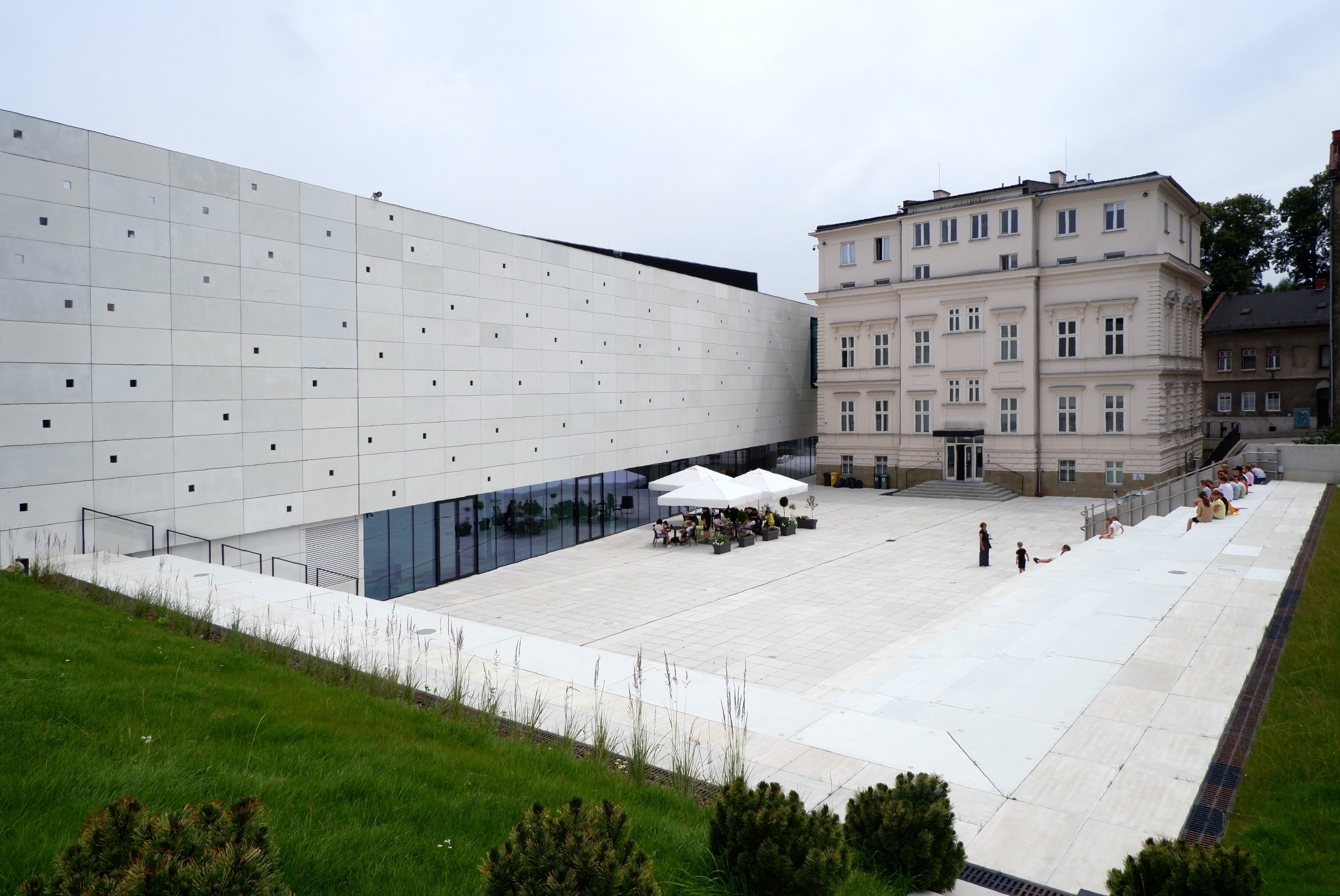
- Headquarters of the studio and the Interactive Centre of Cartoons and Animation in 2024
- Industry: Animation, production, distribution, licensing
- Founded: 1947
- Headquarters: Bielsko-Biała, Poland
- Area served: Worldwide
- Website: www.sfr.pl

Studio Filmów Rysunkowych ("Animated Film Studio") is a Polish animation studio based in Bielsko-Biała. It is best known for animating Polish cartoons of Bolek and Lolek and Reksio.

== History ==
The roots of the studio date back to September 1, 1947, when the Experimental Animated Film Studio was established at the Katowice editorial office of Trybuna Robotnicza. It was managed by Zdzisław Lachur, who collaborated with Władysław Nehrebecki, Leszek Lorek, Alfred Ledwig, Mieczysław Poznański, Wacław Wajser, Maciej Lachur, Aleksander Rohoziński, Wiktor Sakowicz and Rufin Struzik. The first production was the black-and-white film Czy to był sen? about World War II, which was never accepted for distribution. In April 1948, the filmmakers became independent as the Workers' Animated Film Studio and moved their operations to Wisła. There, they soon established a workers' cooperative called the Animated Film Production Team "Śląsk". In November 1948 they moved their headquarters once again, this time to Bielsko, where they were given access to premises in Schneider's former villa at Mickiewicza Street 27, and later at Zdrojowa Street 11A. In 1949, they made the next productions Ich szlaki and Traktor A-1, which were also not accepted for distribution. The first to hit the screens was the film Wilk i niedźwiadki from 1950.

In 1952, the Animated Film Production Team "Śląsk" was dissolved and its members became employees of the Feature Film Studio in Łódź, creating the Animated Film Department based in Bielsko-Biała. At that time, the filmmakers moved to a new location at Cieszyńska Street 24 (Roth's villa), where they were to remain permanently. New creators appeared, including Lechosław Marszałek, who debuted in 1953 with the film Koziołeczek, which received the first prize in the animated film category at the 8th International Film Festival in Karlovy Vary.

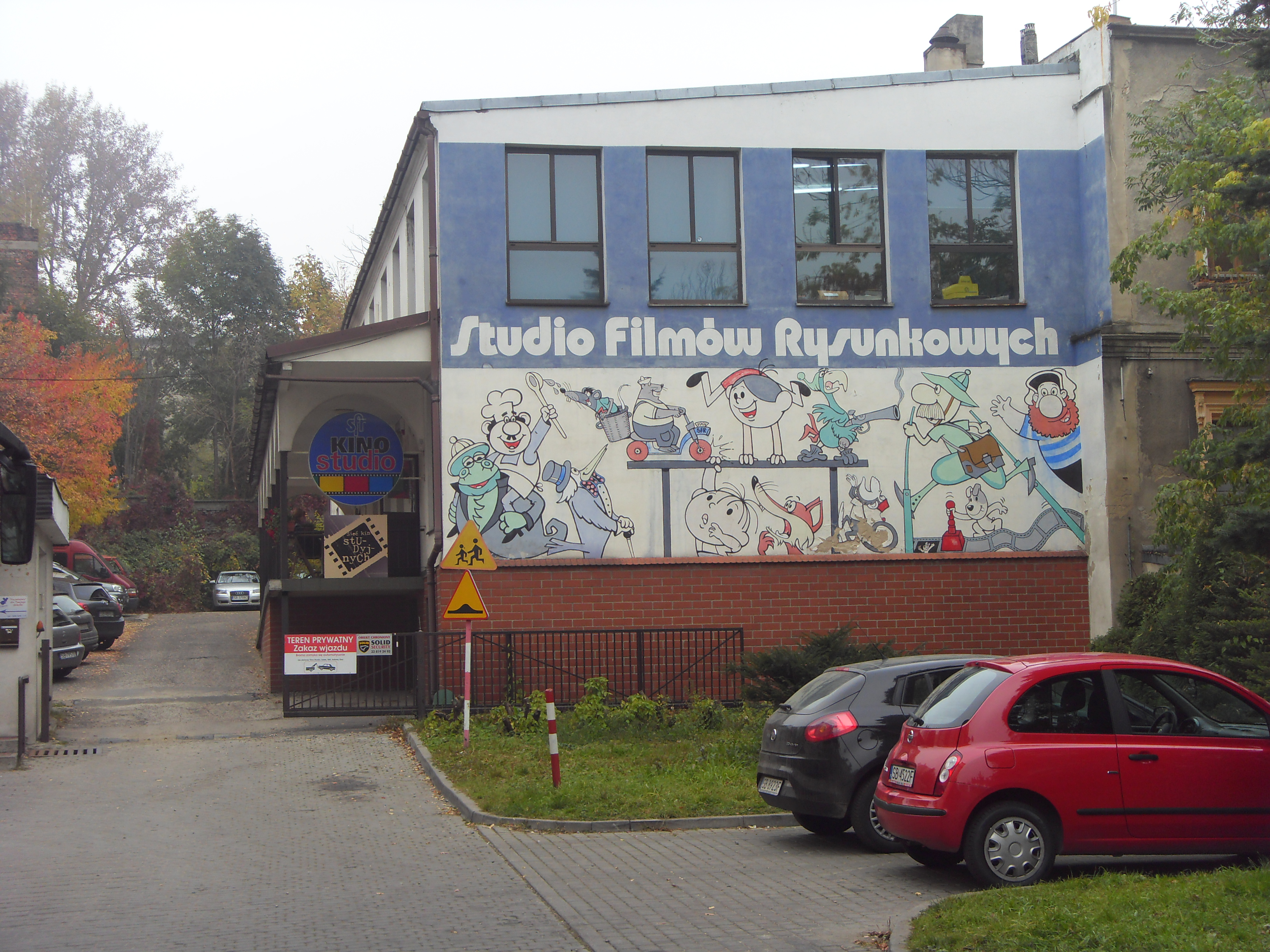
Former headquarters, demolished in 2022

The Animated Film Studio was established as an independent institution by order no. 82 of the President of the Central Office of Cinematography dated August 3, 1955 on the establishment of the "Animated Film Studio", and began its operations on January 1, 1956. Stanisław Kasprzykowski became the first director. Initially, a branch of the SFR was organized in Warsaw under the management of Witold Giersz, which in 1958 was transformed into an independent Studio Miniatur Filmowych. In 1963, the first episode of the adventures of Bolek and Lolek premiered, which – alongside the series about Reksio produced since 1967 – made the SFR most famous in Poland and abroad. The Great Journey of Bolek and Lolek, produced in 1977, was the first full-length animated film in Poland.

In the 1990s, the studio struggled with serious financial problems and a decline in the popularity of its productions, but it did not cease its operations. Między nami bocianami (Between Us Storks) (1997–2003) was the last series created using traditional technology, then it switched to computer animation. In 2011, SFR was transformed into a limited liability company, and in 2015 into a state cultural institution. In 2022, construction began on the OKO Interactive Cartoon and Animation Center – a new museum and educational facility, which was inaugurated on May 24, 2024. The new building, structurally connected to the renovated Roth villa, houses a permanent exhibition devoted to the history of SFR and film animation technology, as well as a single-screen Kreska cinema, which replaced the Studio cinema that existed in 1999–2018. Maciej Chmiel has been the director of the facility in the new formula since 2022.

== Productions ==
=== Animated series ===
- Bolek and Lolek (Bolek i Lolek, 1963–1986)
- Reksio (1967–1990)
- Balthazar the Sponge (1960s–????)
- Miś Kudłatek (1971–1973)
- Margo the Mouse (Przygody Myszki, 1976–1983)
- Kuba and Sruba (Kuba i Śruba), (2011–2016)
