= Bystra, Bielsko County =

Bystra
- Village
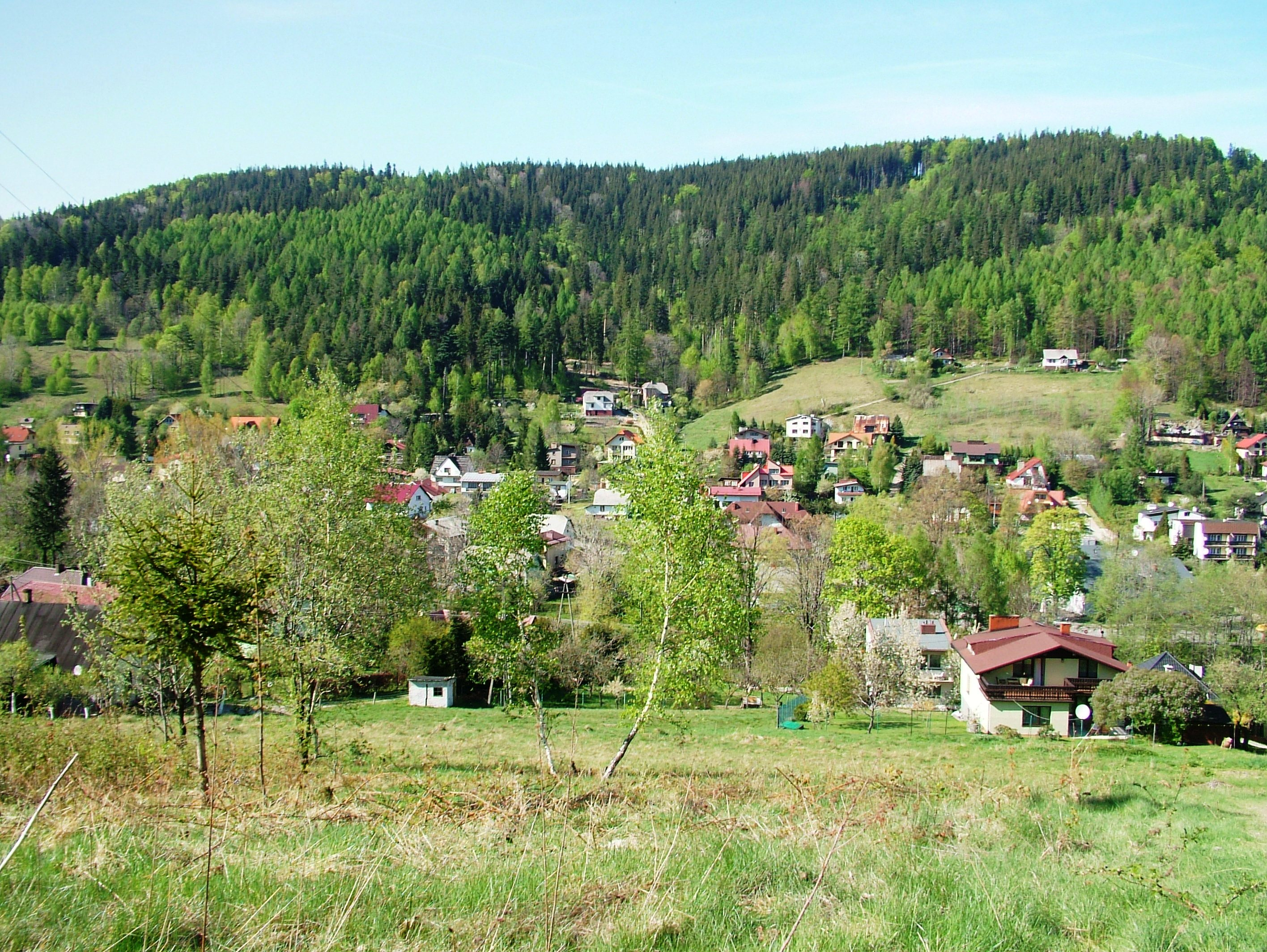
- View of the Bystra Valley

- Coat of arms

- Location within Poland
- Coordinates: 49°45′43″N 19°4′20″E
- Country: Poland
- Voivodeship: Silesian
- County: Bielsko
- Gmina: Wilkowice
- Established: 16th century
- Population: 3,887
- Website: http://bystra.pl

Bystra [ˈbɨstra] is a village in the administrative district of Gmina Wilkowice, within Bielsko County, Silesian Voivodeship, in southern Poland.

The village is located in Silesian Beskids, alongside Bystra stream. The name of the village is of topographic origin borrowed from an older name of the Bystra stream (nominative bystry: fast, rapid).

== History ==
The village lies along the Bystra stream, left tributary of Biała River that historically divided the village into two parts: Bystra Krakowska (Cracovian Bystra) and Bystra Śląska (Silesian Bystra). They were therefore established in the 16th century as two separate villages.

=== Bystra Śląska ===
Silesian village lying on the left northern bank of the Bystra stream was first mentioned in 1570 when it was sold together with Silesian Mikuszowice and an adjacent wood by dukes of Cieszyn to the town of Bielsko. Soon after in 1572 it became a part Bielsko state country (since 1754 Duchy of Bielsko) that was split from the Duchy of Teschen. The village also politically belonged to the Habsburg monarchy.

In the second half of the 19th century the village became a spa resort, especially after opening a railway line in 1878 a nearby Wilkowice.

After the Revolutions of 1848 in the Austrian Empire a modern municipal division was introduced in the re-established Austrian Silesia. The village as a municipality was subscribed to the political and legal district of Bielsko. According to the censuses conducted in 1880, 1890, 1900 and 1910 the population of the municipality grew from 397 in 1880 to 548 in 1910 with a dwindling majority being native German-speakers (from 76.9% in 1880 to 51.7% in 1910) accompanied by a German-speaking minority (at most 14 or 1.9% in 1880), in terms of religion in 1910 majority were Roman Catholics (81.1%), followed by Protestants (14%), Jews (25 or 4.6%) and 2 people adhering to yet another faith. It was then considered to be a part of a German language island around Bielsko (German: Bielitz-Bialaer Sprachinsel).

=== Bystra Krakowska ===
Cracovian village lying on the right southern bank of the Bystra stream was also established in the 16th century. It belonged then to Żywiec latifundium and since 1618 to Łodygowice latifundium that was split from it. The village also politically belonged to the Crown of Poland.

Upon the First Partition of Poland in 1772 it became part of the Austrian Kingdom of Galicia. According to the Austrian census of 1900 the village had 947 inhabitants, all of them were Polish-speaking Roman Catholics.

=== 20th century ===
After World War I and the fall of Austria-Hungary, Bystra Krakowska became a part of Poland in 1918. Bystra Śląska also became a part of Poland after the Polish–Czechoslovak War and the division of Cieszyn Silesia in 1920.

The villages were annexed by Nazi Germany at the beginning of World War II. After Germany's defeat in the war, they were restored to Poland.

== People ==
- Julian Fałat, a painter, lived in Bystra Śląska since 1910 and died there in 1929. There is a museum dedicated him in the village.
