= Meszna, Silesian Voivodeship =

Meszna
- Village
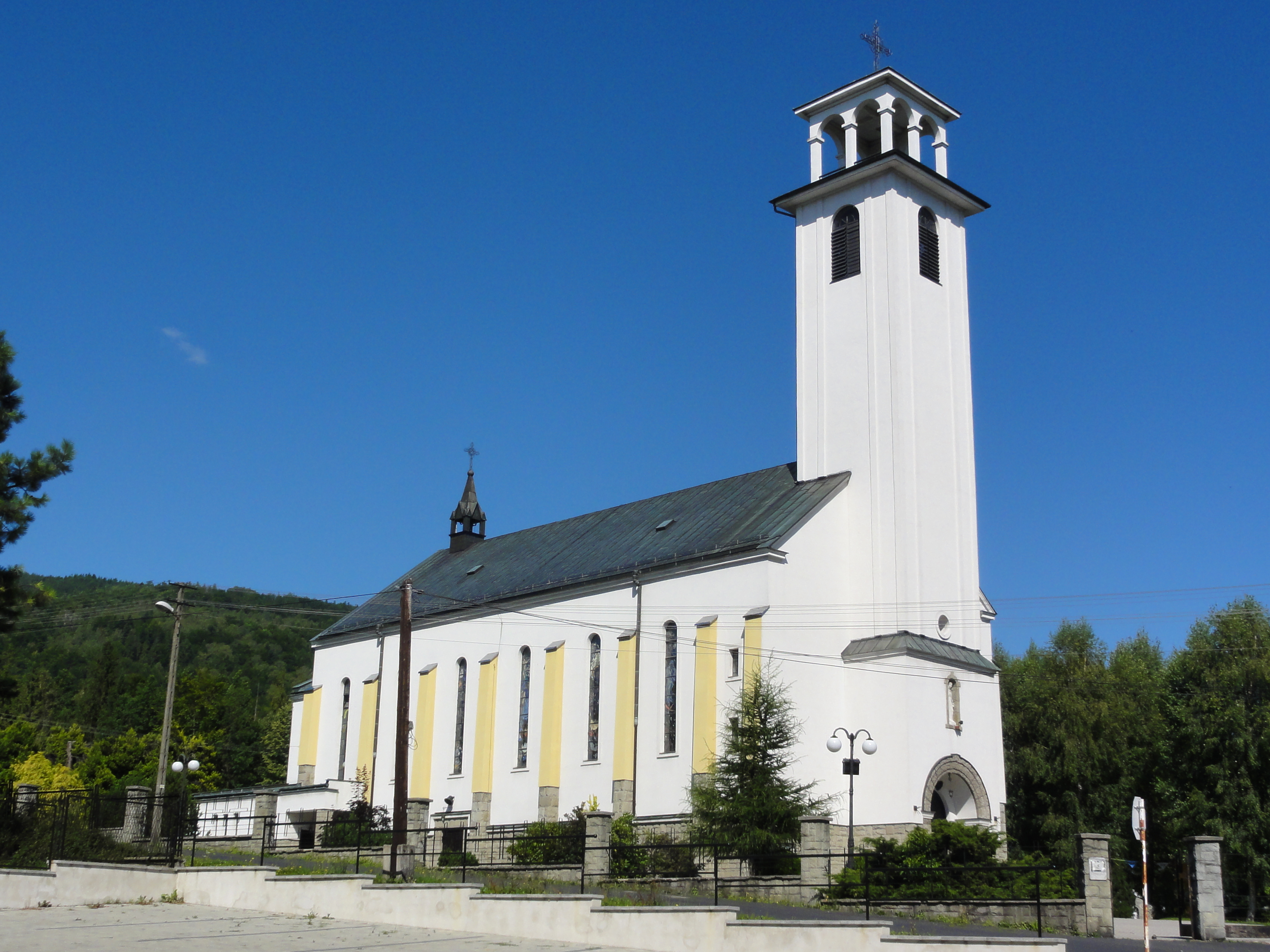
- Church of the Immaculate Heart

- Coat of arms

- Location within Poland
- Coordinates: 49°44′54″N 19°3′48″E
- Country: Poland
- Voivodeship: Silesian
- County: Bielsko
- Gmina: Wilkowice
- Highest elevation: 1,109 m (3,638 ft)
- Lowest elevation: 620 m (2,030 ft)
- Population: 1,831

Meszna [ˈmɛʂna] is a village in the administrative district of Gmina Wilkowice, within Bielsko County, Silesian Voivodeship, in southern Poland.

The village lies on the slopes of Klimczok mountain.
