= Wilkowice, Bielsko County =

Wilkowice
- Village
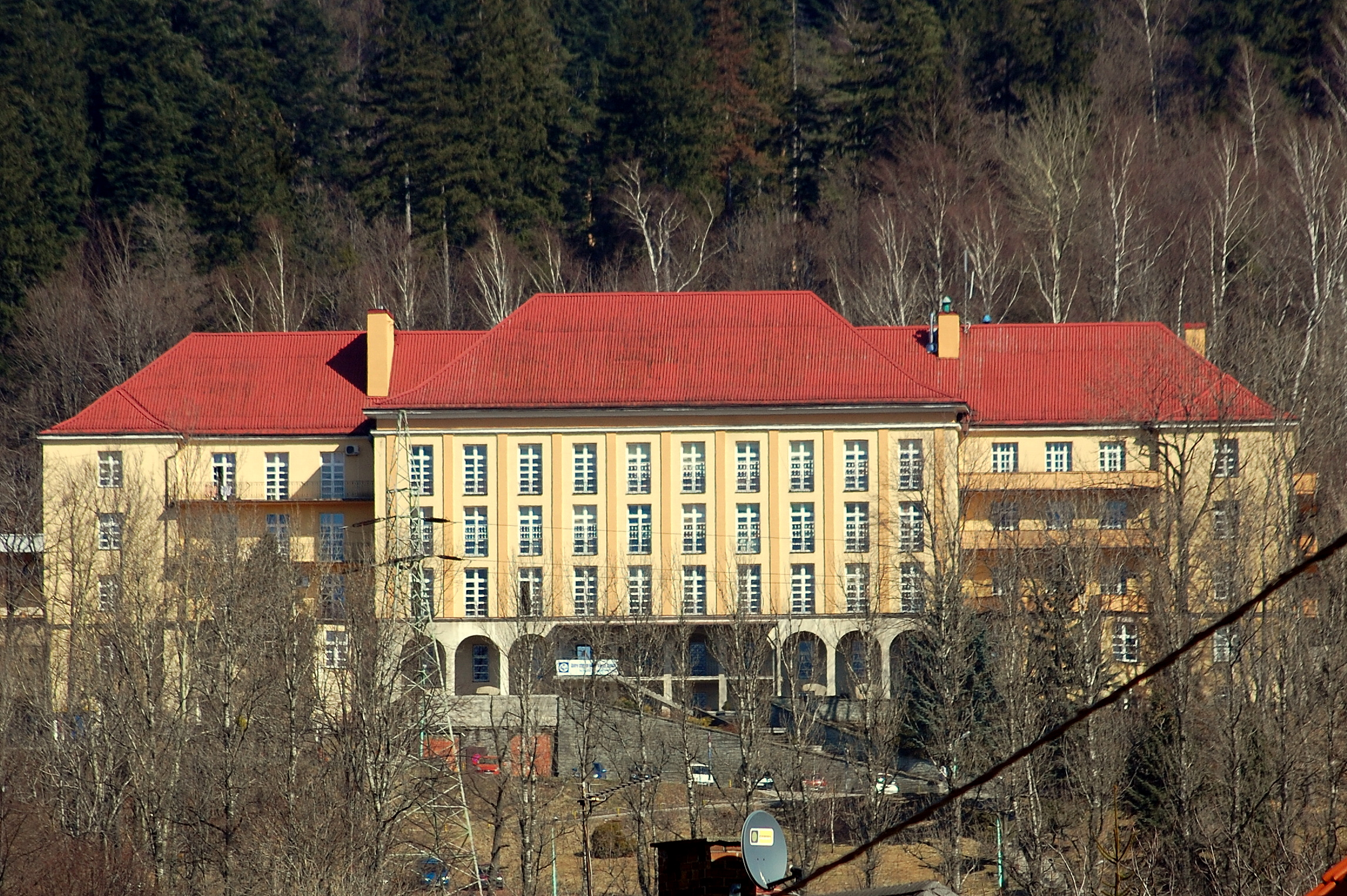
- Hospital in Wilkowice

- Coat of arms

- Location within Poland
- Coordinates: 49°45′N 19°6′E
- Country: Poland
- Voivodeship: Silesian
- County: Bielsko
- Gmina: Wilkowice
- Established: early 14th century
- Elevation: 380–909 m (1,247–2,982 ft)
- Population: 6,496
- Website: www.wilkowice.pl

Wilkowice [vilkɔˈvit͡sɛ] is a village in Bielsko County, Silesian Voivodeship, in southern Poland. It is the seat of the gmina (administrative district) called Gmina Wilkowice.

It is one of the oldest villages in Żywiec Basin. It was established in the early 14th century by the Cistercian monastery in Rudy, which owned the area alongside Łodygowice and Pietrzykowice.

== Tourist attractions ==
The main attraction of the village are the tourist mountain trails running to the top of Magurka and Rogacz. Other natural assets include rocks and mountain streams. Among the Monuments of Wilkowice it is worth mentioning:

- Saint Michael Church from 1900
- Parish cemetery
- Epidemic cemetery from 1847
- Old railway station from the 19th century
- Hospital from the 19th century
- Old mill by the river Biała

== Gallery ==
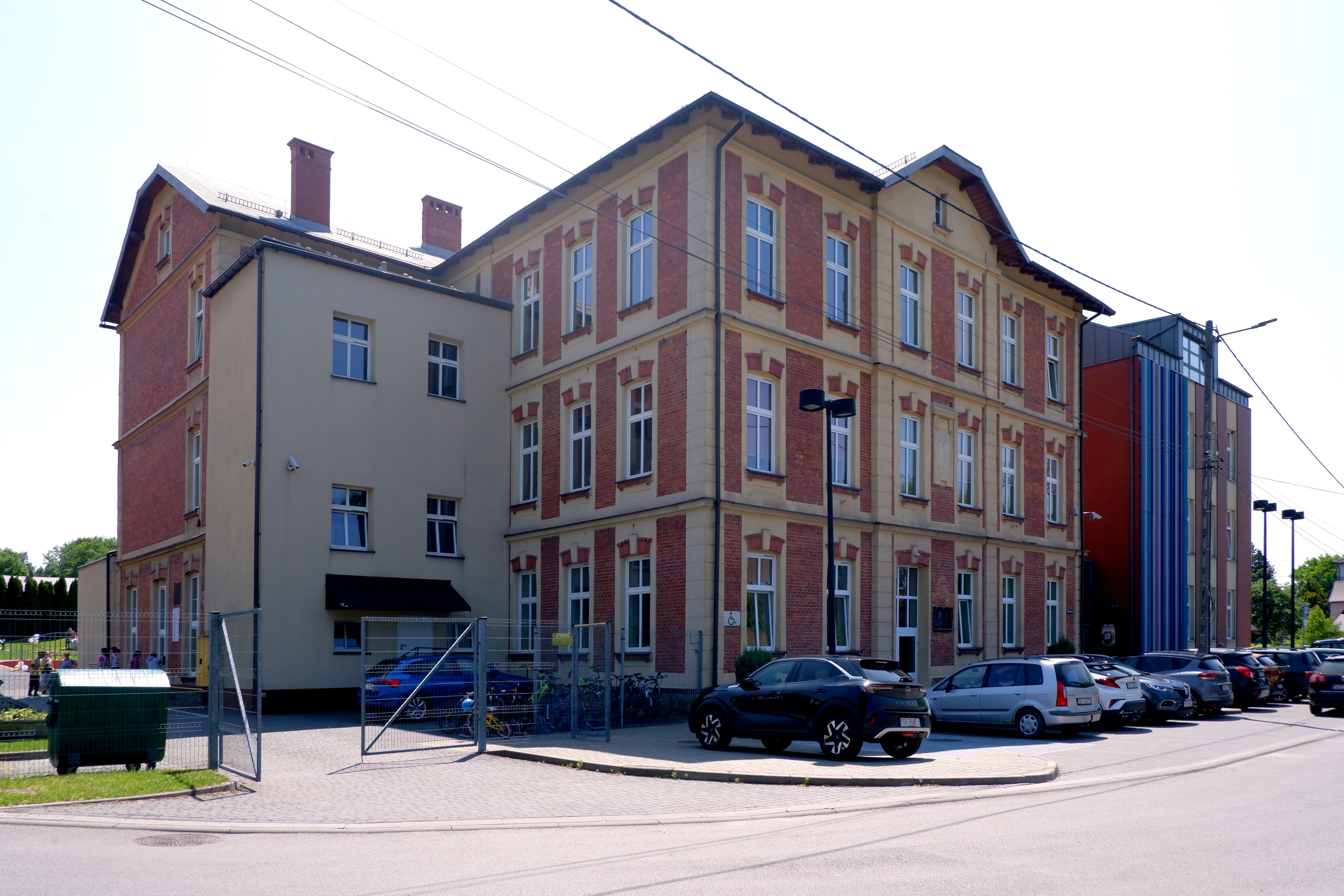
School number 1 in Wilkowice

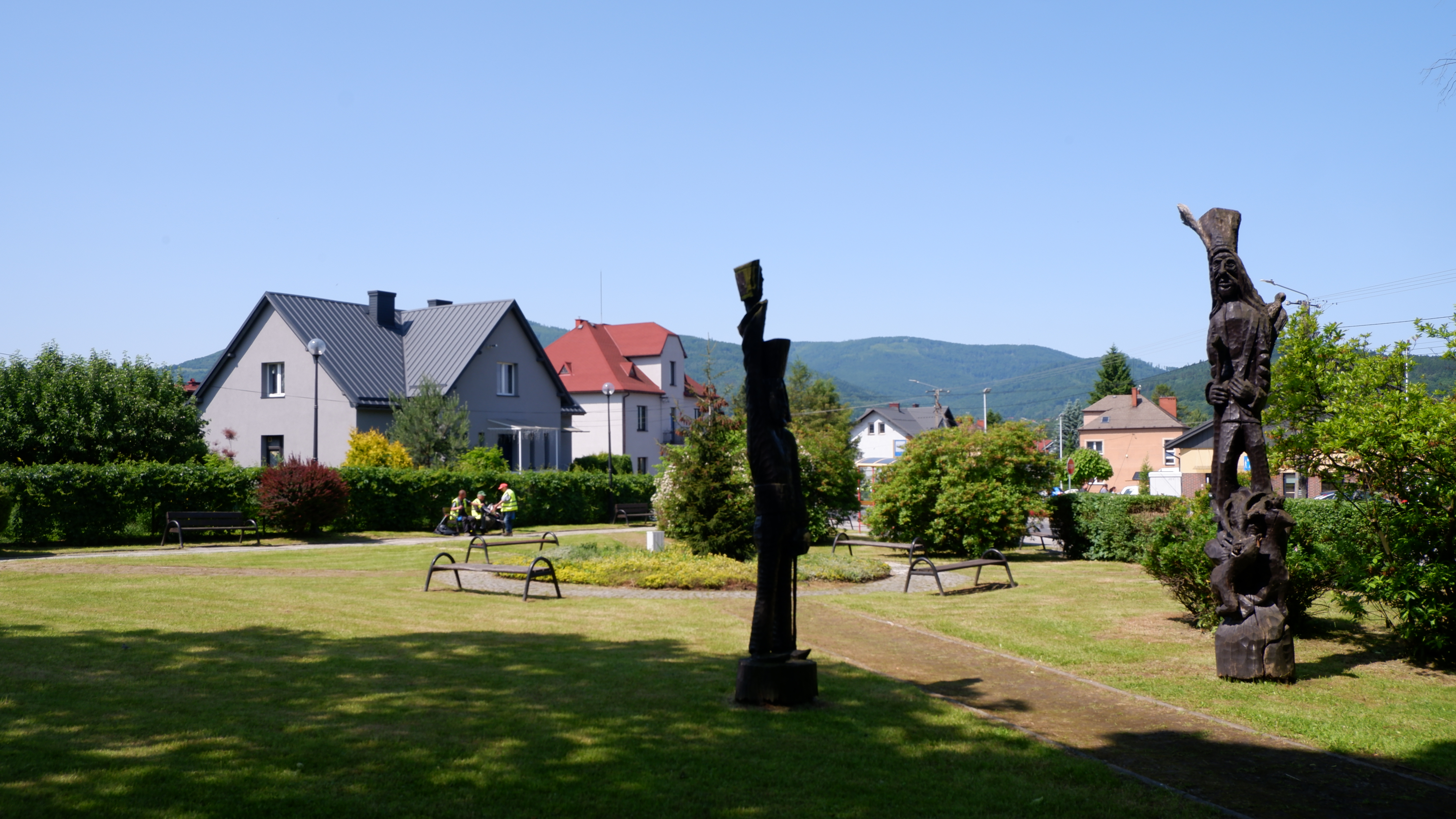
Little park in center of village

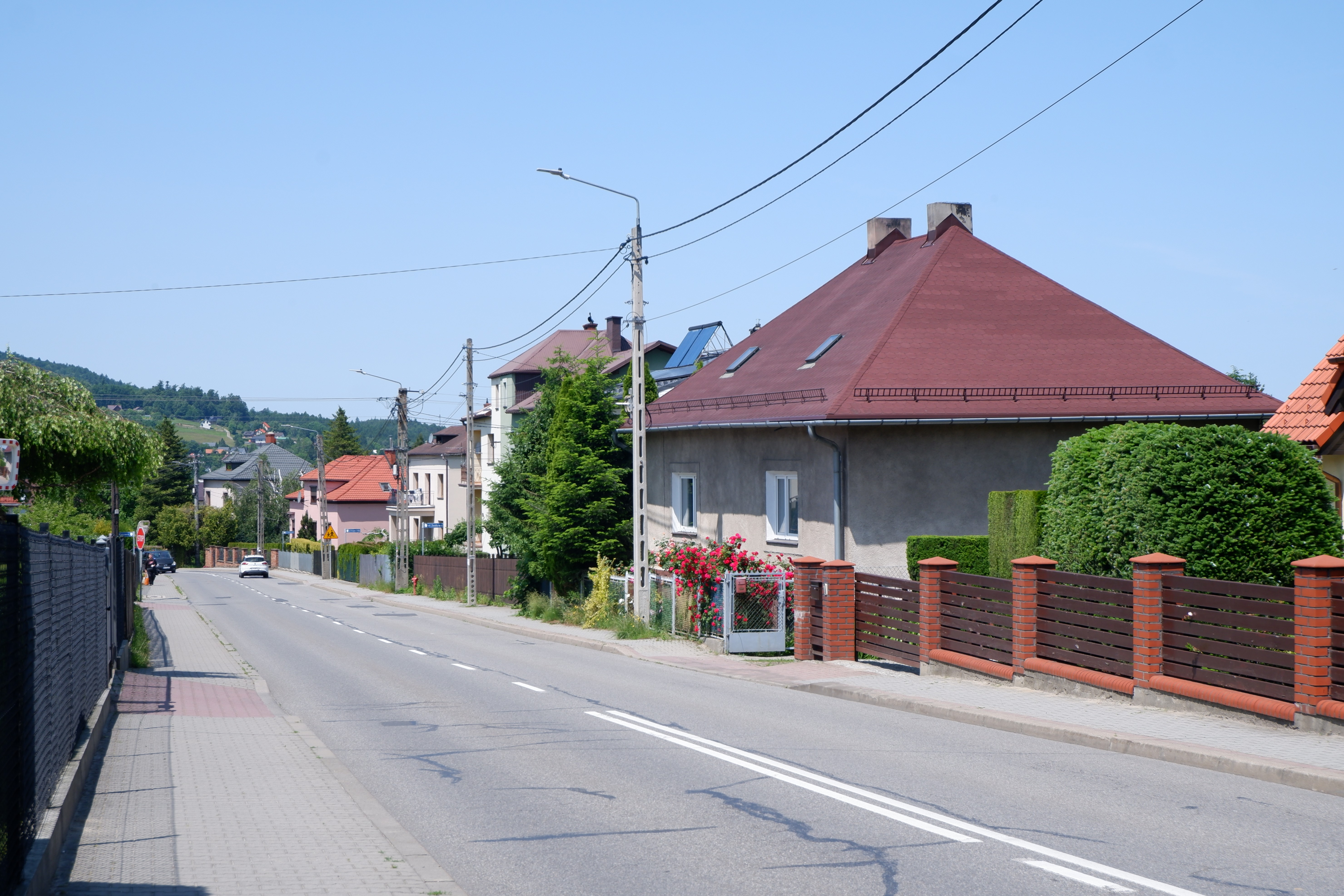
Wyzwolenia Street

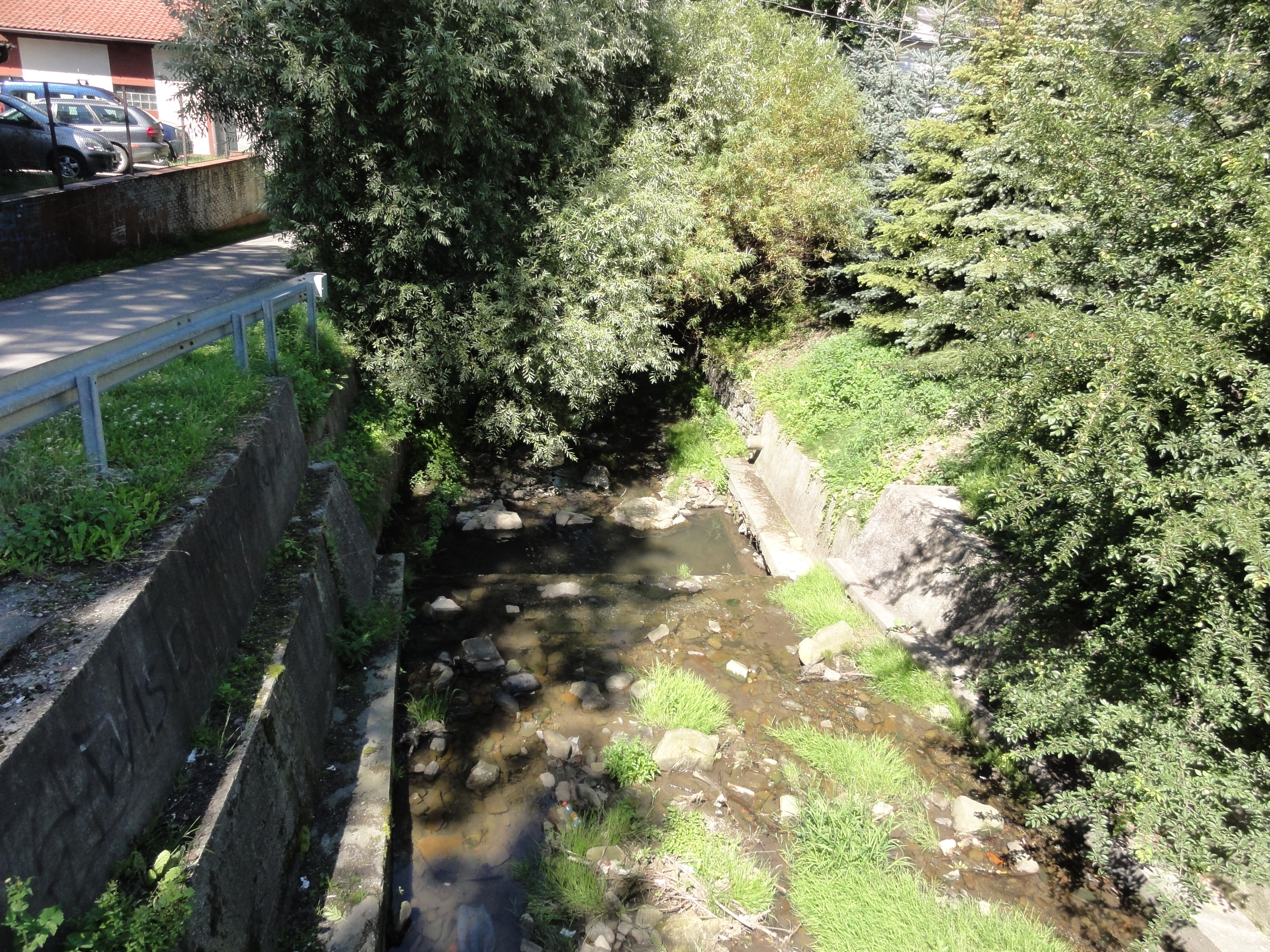
Wilkówka River in front of school

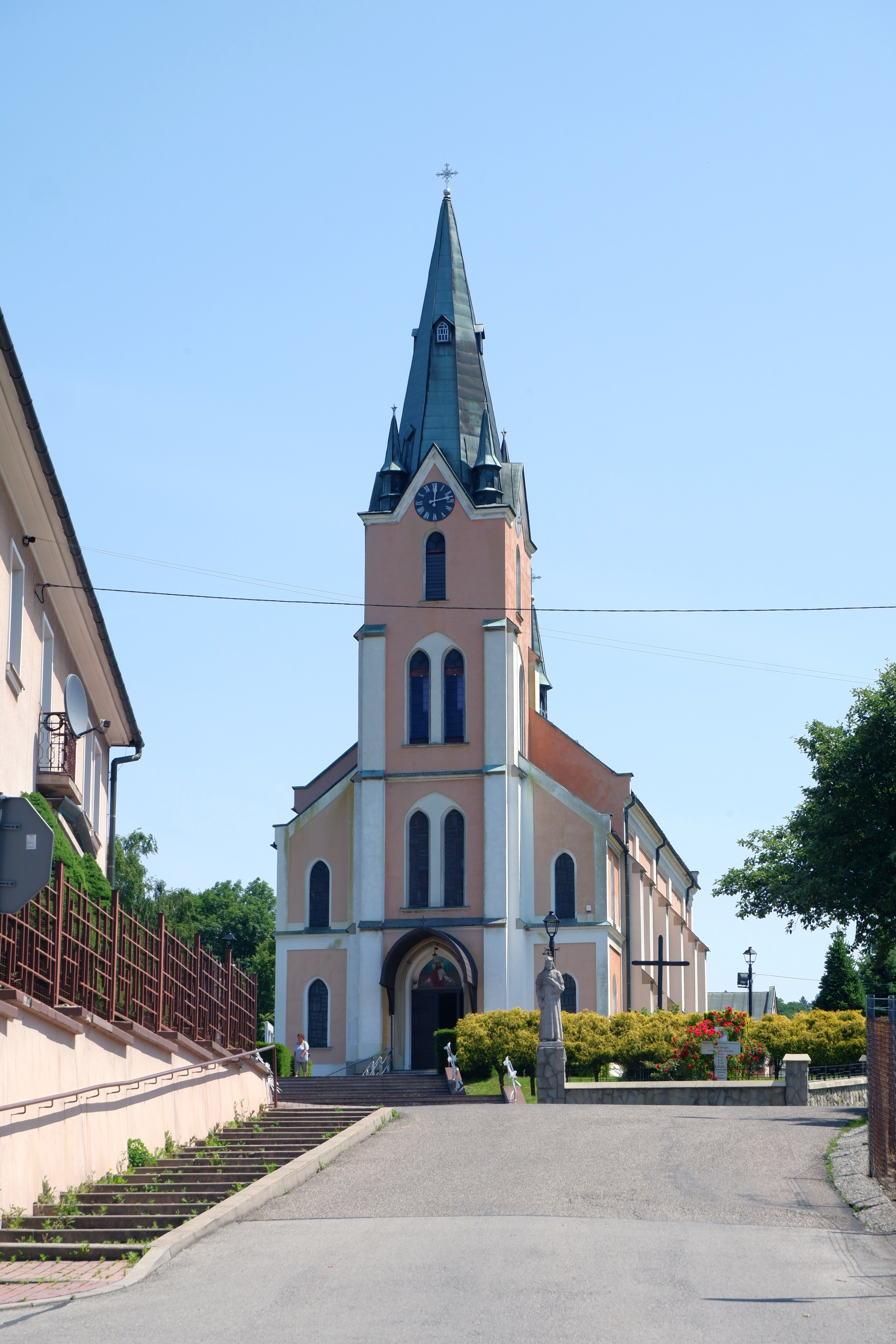
Saint Michael Church

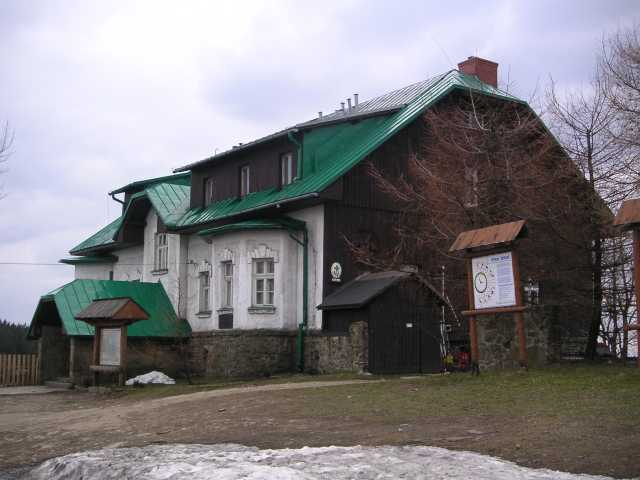
Mountain Hostel in Magurka

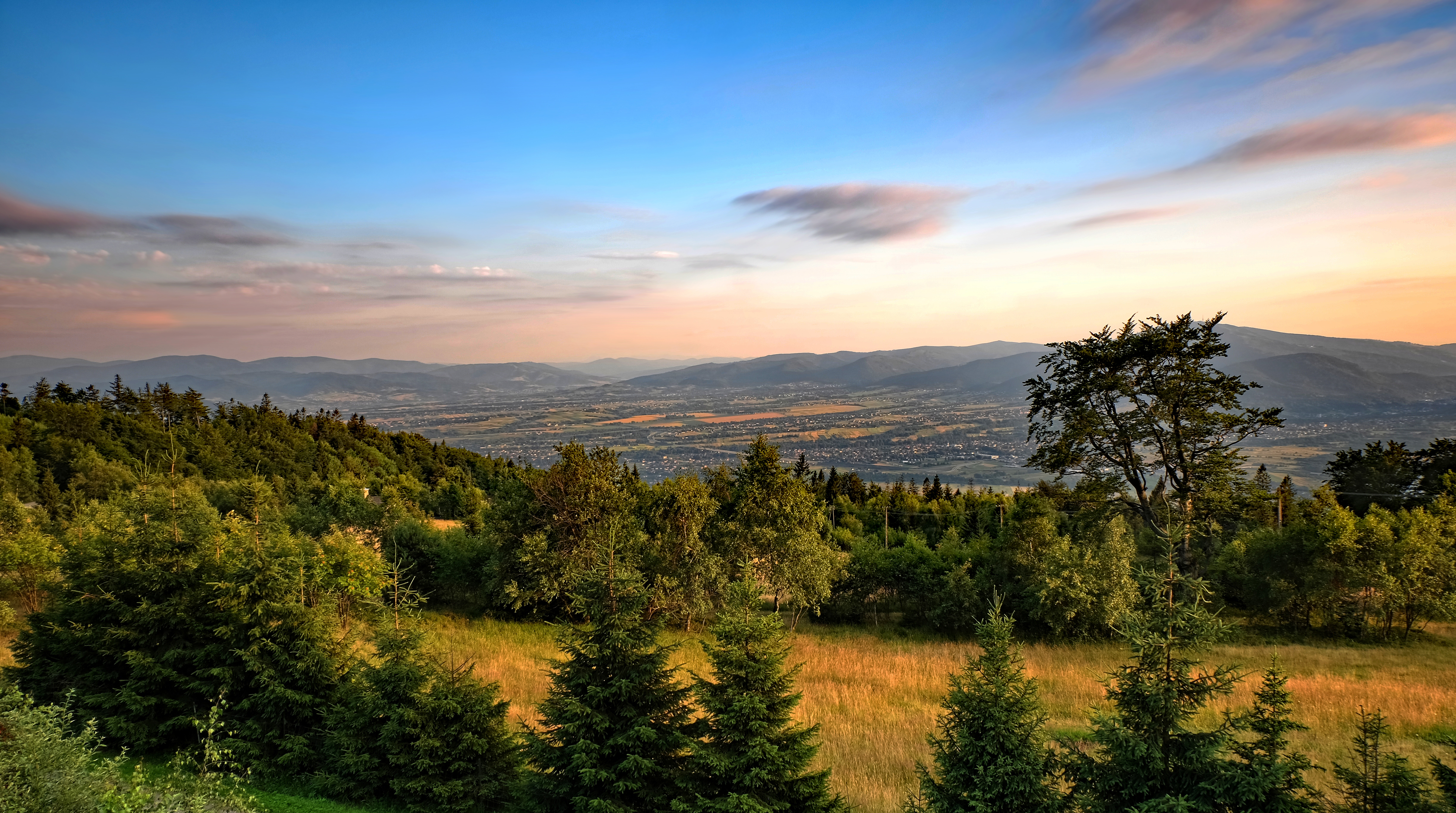
View from Magurka (909 a.s.l.)
