= Gmina Wilkowice =

Gmina Wilkowice Wilkowice Commune
- Gmina
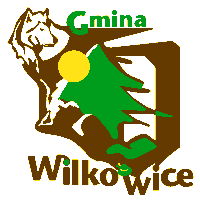
- Coat of arms

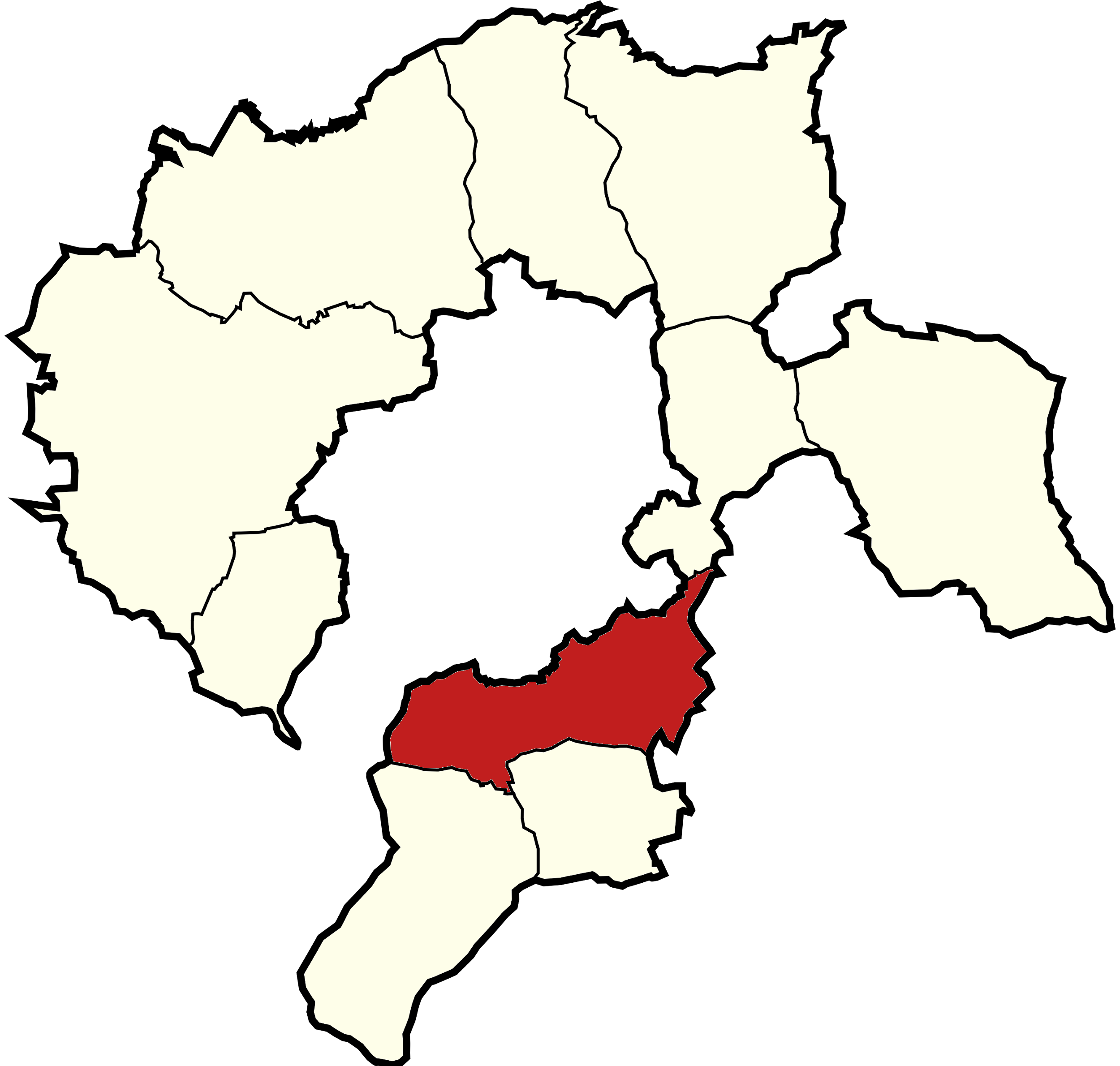
- Gmina Wilkowice within the Bielsko County
- Coordinates (Wilkowice): 49°45′48″N 19°5′26″E
- Country: Poland
- Voivodeship: Silesian
- County: Bielsko
- Seat: Wilkowice

Area
  - Total: 33.9 km^{2} (13.1 sq mi)

Population (2019-06-30)
  - Total: 13,409
  - Density: 396/km^{2} (1,020/sq mi)
- Website: http://www.wilkowice.pl

Gmina Wilkowice is a rural gmina (administrative district) in Bielsko County, Silesian Voivodeship, in southern Poland. Its seat is the village of Wilkowice, which lies approximately 8 kilometres (5 mi) south of Bielsko-Biała and 55 km (34 mi) south of the regional capital Katowice. The gmina also contains the villages of Bystra and Meszna.

The gmina covers an area of 33.9 square kilometres (13.1 sq mi), and as of 2019 its total population is 13,409.

== Neighbouring gminas ==
Gmina Wilkowice is bordered by the towns of Bielsko-Biała and Szczyrk, and by the gminas of Buczkowice, Czernichów, Kozy and Łodygowice.

== Twin towns – sister cities ==
Gmina Wilkowice is twinned with:

- Bziny, Slovakia
- Krásná, Czech Republic
- Likavka, Slovakia
- Lubiewo, Poland
