= Biała (Vistula) =

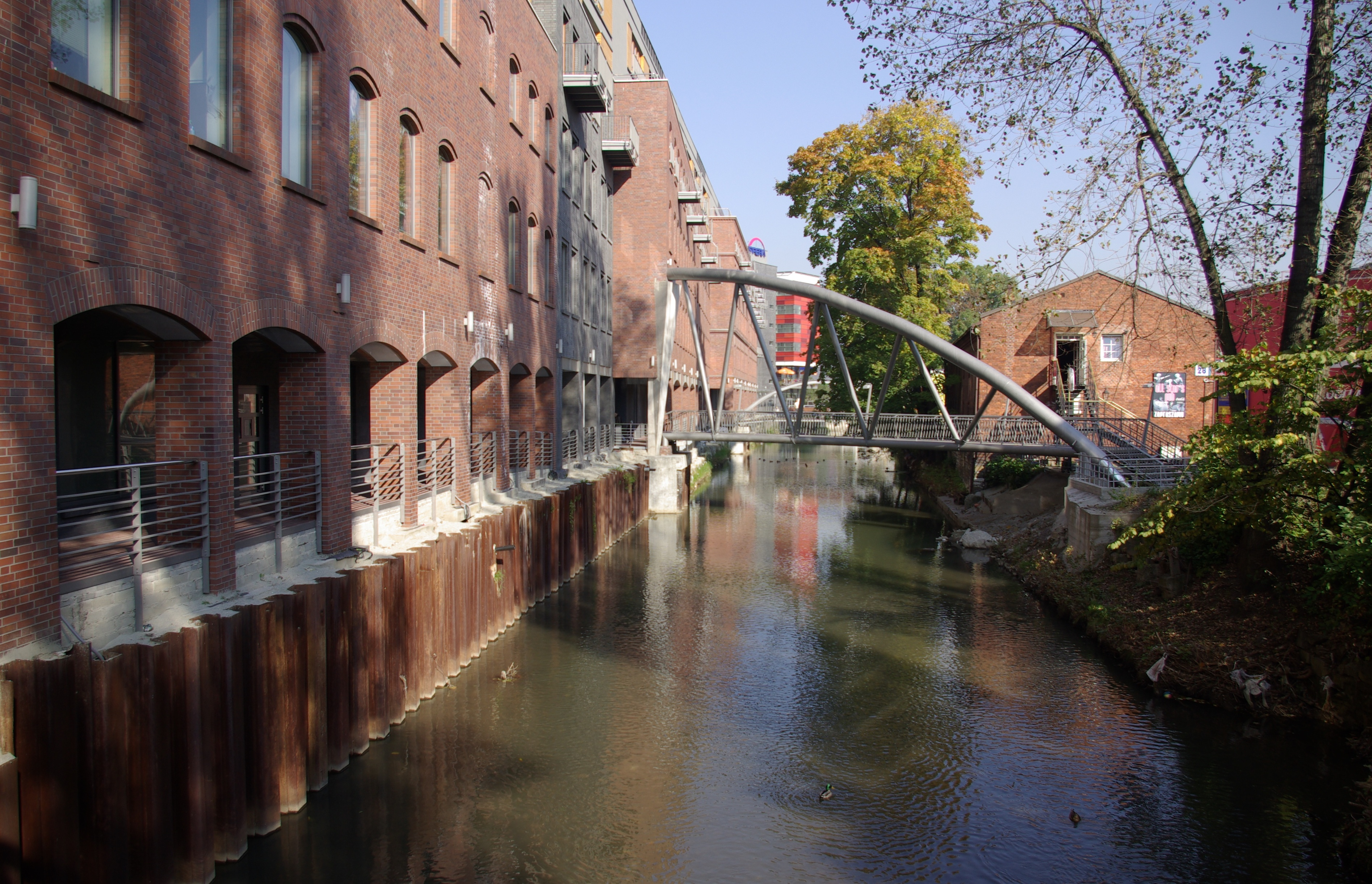
- Biała River in Bielsko-Biała

Location
- Country: Poland

Physical characteristics
- Source
  - location: Silesian Beskids
  - elevation: about 1,020 m (3,346 ft)
- Mouth
  - location: Vistula
  - coordinates: 49°56′51″N 19°01′34″E
- Length: 28.875 km (17.942 mi)
- Basin size: 139 km^{2} (54 sq mi)

Basin features
- Progression: Vistula→ Baltic Sea

The Biała (German: Bialka) is a river in southern Poland. The 29 km (18 mi) long Biała is a right tributary of the Vistula. It is the main river of the city of Bielsko-Biała and used to be historically important as a border river dividing not only Bielsko and Biała but also for several centuries the states of Bohemia (succeeded by the Habsburg monarchy) and Poland.

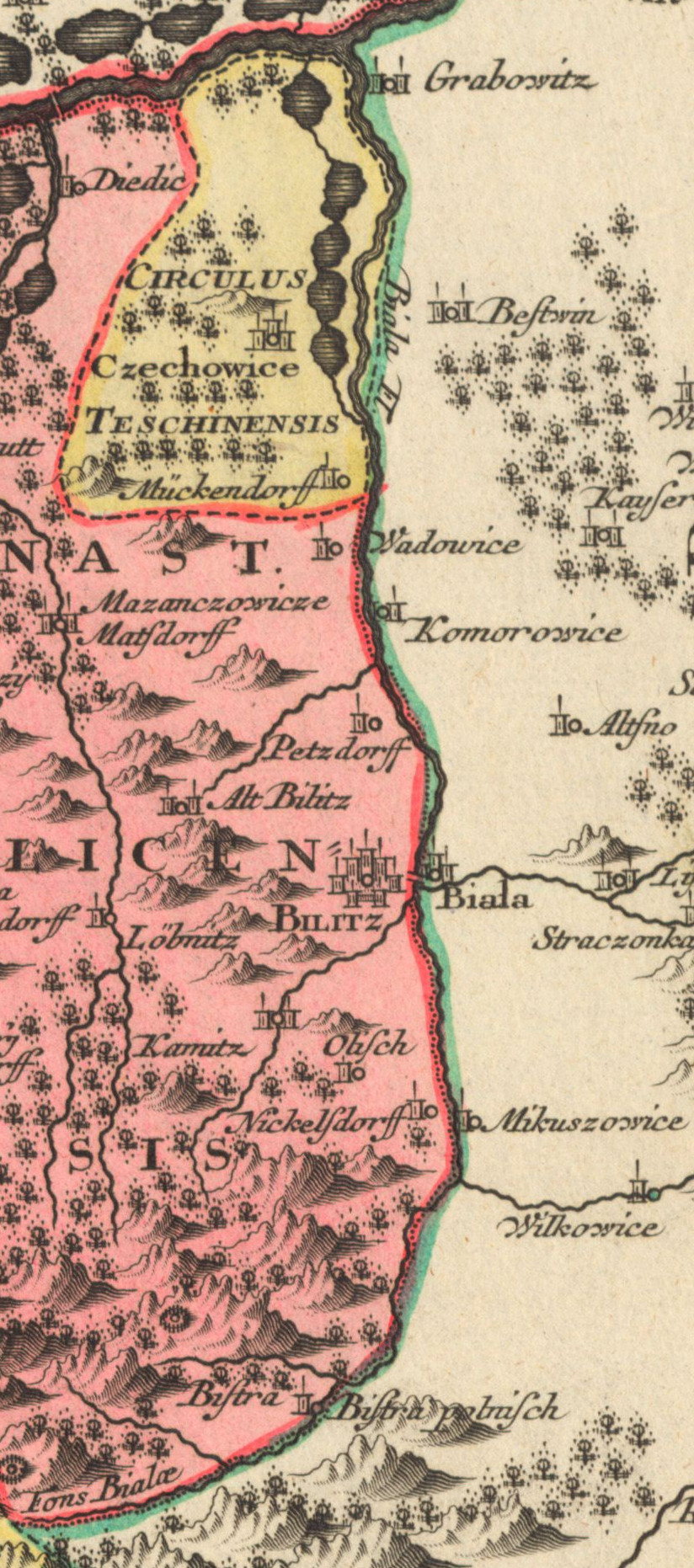
Biała as a border river on a map from the 18th century

== Geography ==
Two sources of the river are located on the north-east slopes of the Klimczok mountain in the Silesian Beskids on the elevation of around 1,020 and 900 metres (3,350 and 2,950 ft). The upper part the river, known as Białka (diminutive form of Biała), has characteristics of a mountain stream. The first settlement it runs through is the village of Bystra. Before Mikuszowice it joins with Biała stream beginning on eastern slopes of Magura mountain in Little Beskids, then the river veers north and on the length of 15.7 km (9.8 mi) it forms a pivotal line of the city of Bielsko-Biała, afterward it flows in between Czechowice-Dziedzice to the west and Gmina Bestwina to the east, and empties to Vistula River on the elevation of 240 metres (790 ft).

== Border river ==
In the 13th century both banks of the river belonged to the Silesian Duchy of Opole and Racibórz but the valley of the river was yet sparsely populated defining a natural border between castellanies of Cieszyn and Oświęcim and ecclesiastical border between dioceses of Wrocław and Kraków. In 1290, in the process of feudal fragmentation of Poland the Duchy of Cieszyn, encompassing both Cieszyn and Oświęcim and so also both banks of the river, was split from it. Roughly at that time several new settlements were established alongside the river, including foundation of the town of Bielsko.

Mieszko I, Duke of Cieszyn, the first ruler of the duchy, died in 1315 and afterwards his sons divided its land into two parts alongside Biała River: diminished Duchy of Teschen to west and Duchy of Oświęcim to east. In the middle of the 15th century Duchy of Oświęcim was bought into the Crown of the Kingdom of Poland and so the river constituted henceforth the border between Polish and the Bohemian Crown (since 1526 part of the Habsburg Monarchy). Upon the First Partition of Poland in 1772 the river ceased to be a state border and continued as a regional border between Austrian Silesia to the west and Galicia to the east. After World War I and the 1919 Polish–Czechoslovak War it separated the Polish part of Cieszyn Silesia in the Autonomous Silesian Voivodeship from Lesser Polish Kraków Voivodeship.
