= Mikuszowice =

- District of Bielsko-Biała
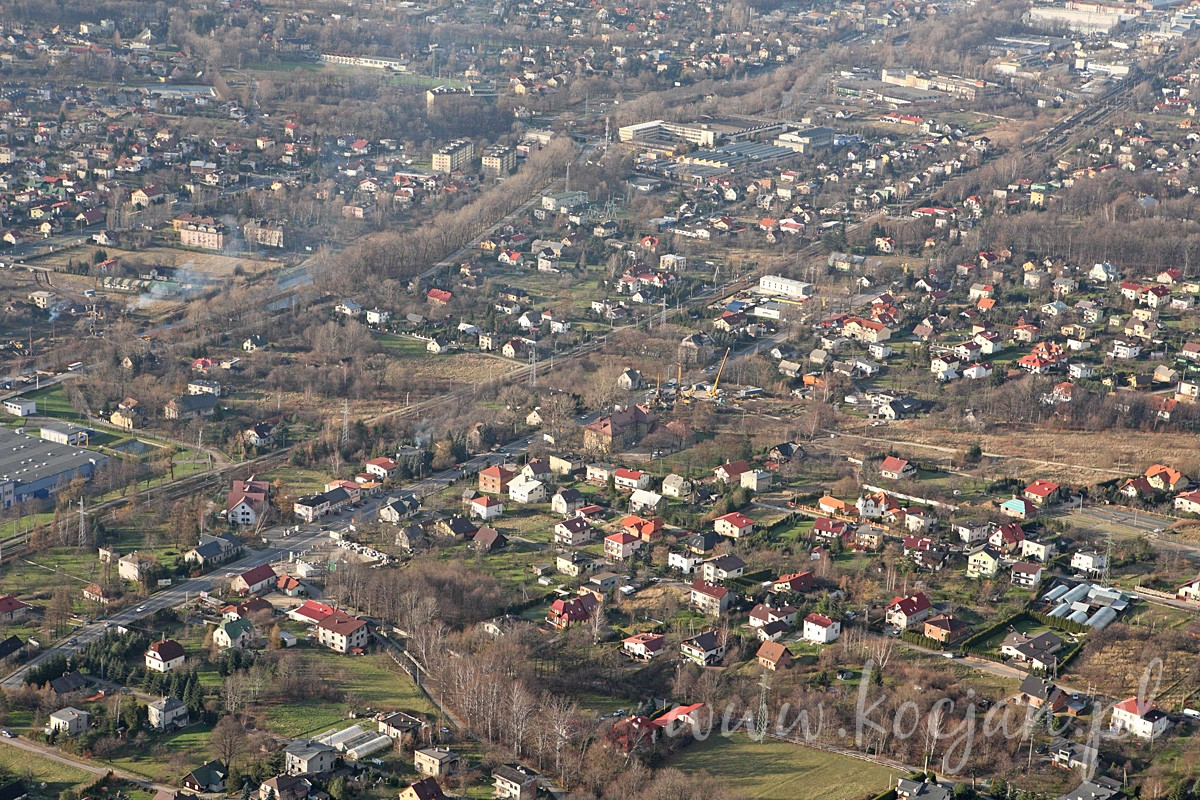
- Aerial view

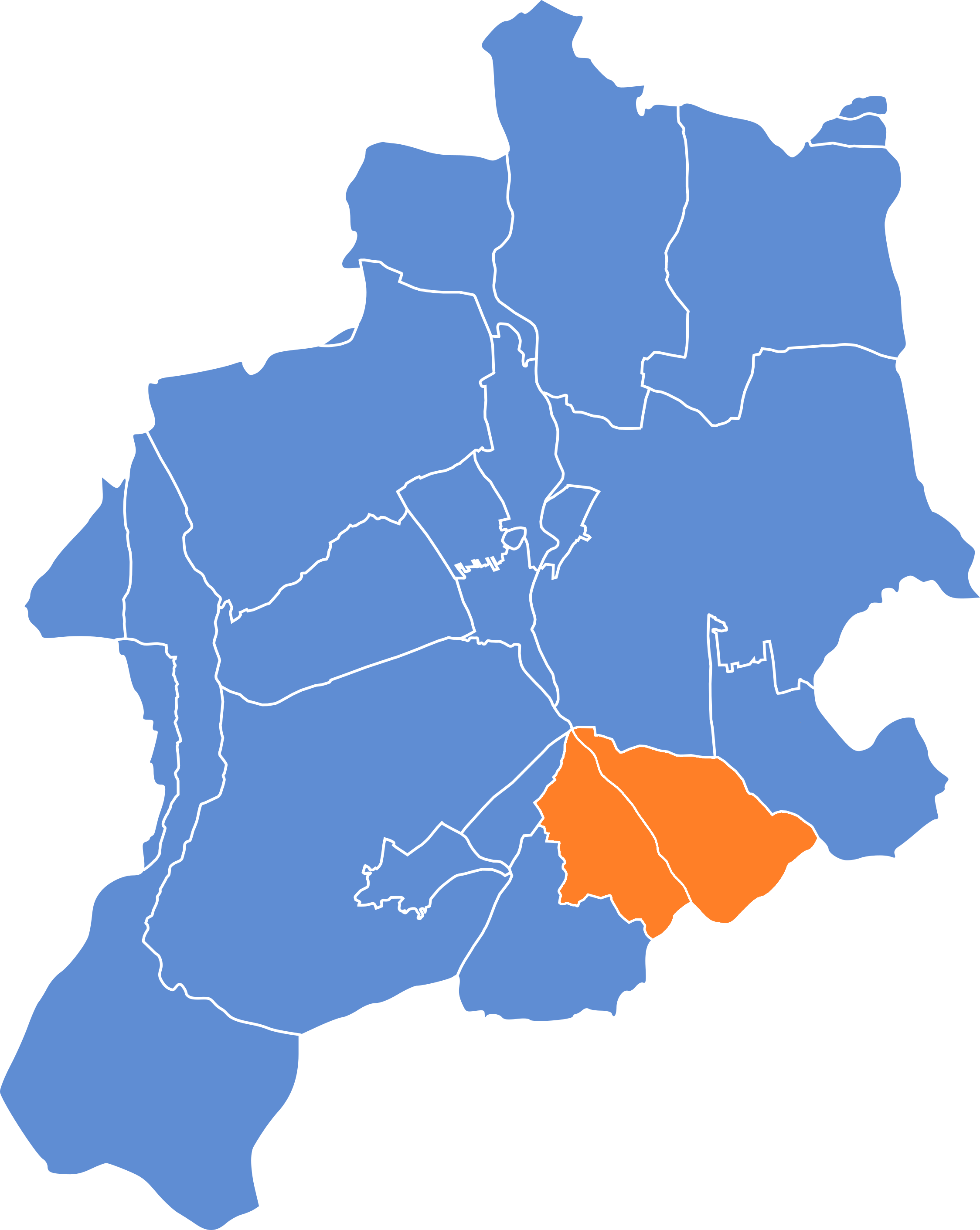
- Location of Mikuszowice within Bielsko-Biała
- Coordinates: 49°47′0″N 19°4′13″E
- Country: Poland
- Voivodeship: Silesian
- County/City: Bielsko-Biała

Area
  - Total: 16.3315 km^{2} (6.3056 sq mi)

Population (2006)
  - Total: 10,041
  - Density: 614.82/km^{2} (1,592.4/sq mi)
- Time zone: UTC+1 (CET)
  - Summer (DST): UTC+2 (CEST)
- Area code: (+48) 033

Mikuszowice (German: Nikelsdorf) is an informal dzielnica (district) of Bielsko-Biała, Silesian Voivodeship, Poland. It is located in the southern part of the city on both banks of the Biała River, the historical border river between Silesia and Lesser Poland; and from the mid-15th century to 1772, also the states of Poland and Bohemia (from 1526 part of the Habsburg monarchy).

Administratively there are two osiedla (a form of districts), which have a combined area of 16.3315 km^{2} (Mikuszowice Krakowskie: 3.8602 km^{2}, Mikuszowice Śląskie: 12.4713 km^{2}) and on December 31, 2006 had altogether 10,041 inhabitants (2,867 in Mikuszowice Krakowskie, 7,174 in Mikuszowice Śląskie).

== History ==
The village was established in the early 14th century shortly after the foundation of Bielsko. It was first mentioned in 1312 in the document of Mieszko I, Duke of Cieszyn in which the duke bestowed the forest between Kamienica and Mikuszowice upon the town dwellers of Bielsko. Being then mentioned as Nickelstorff, the name being an amalgam of Nicholas in German spelling and dorf (German: a village), it was undoubtedly established by German settlers. In 1314 or 1315 in the process of feudal fragmentation of Poland the Duchy of Oświęcim was split from the Duchy of Teschen with the new border running along Biała River and cutting through Mikuszowice, dividing it into two parts.

=== Mikuszowice Krakowskie ===
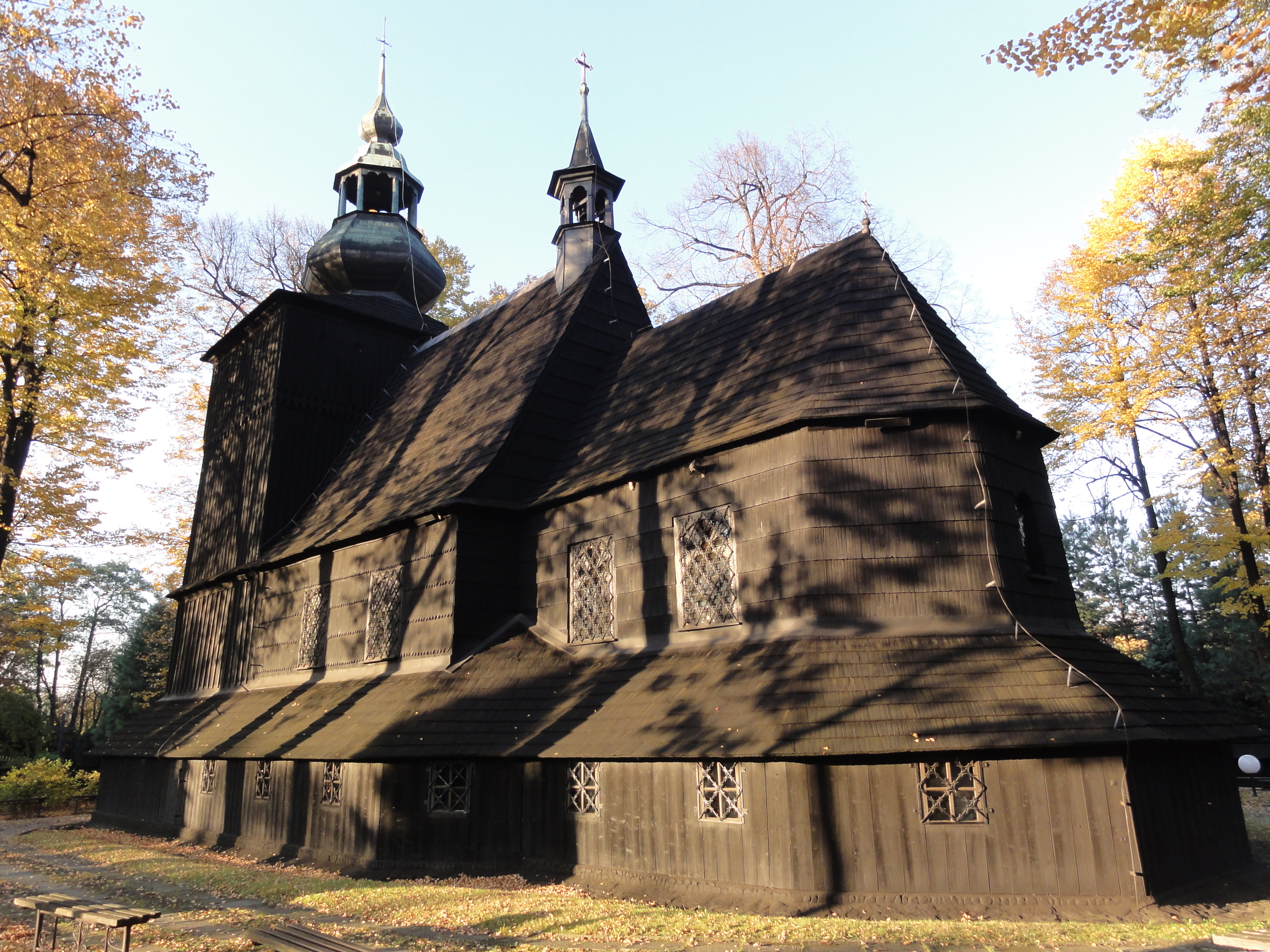
Saint Barbara Church

The part of the village on the right bank of the Biała river became a part of the Duchy of Oświęcim, which in 1327 became a fee of the Kingdom of Bohemia. In 1457 Jan IV of Oświęcim agreed to sell the duchy to the Polish Crown, and in the accompanying document issued on 21 February the village was mentioned as Mykluschowicze.

The territory of the Duchy of Oświęcim was eventually incorporated into Poland in 1564 and formed Silesian County of Kraków Voivodeship. In 1690 the wooden Saint Barbara church was built here, currently an important landmark of the district. Upon the First Partition of Poland in 1772 it became part of the Austrian Kingdom of Galicia. In the 19th century Mikuszowice Krakowskie were industrialised. After World War I and fall of Austria-Hungary in 1918 it became part of Poland.

=== Mikuszowice Śląskie ===
The part of the village on the left bank of the Biała river continued to be a part of the Duchy of Teschen, which like the Duchy of Oświęcim in 1327 also became a fee of the Kingdom of Bohemia. However, when the Duchy of Oświęcim became a part of Poland in the 1450s, the Duchy of Teschen continued to be a part of the Kingdom of Bohemia, which itself became a part of the Habsburg monarchy in 1526. Biała River constituted then a state border. In 1572 Mikuszowice Śląskie were sold together with Bielsko and dozen surrounding villages by dukes of Teschen and formed Bielsko state country (since 1754 a duchy). In the middle of the 17th century Stanisław Warszycki, the owner of Mikuszowice Krakowskie occupied the Silesian counterpart of the village, which led to an intervention of the Habsburg army in 1655. A year later the village was assaulted by Swedish army in the course of the so called Deluge, local peasants failed to defend themselves, and both villages were burned on 8 March.

After the Revolutions of 1848 in the Austrian Empire a modern municipal division was introduced in the re-established Austrian Silesia. The village as a municipality was subscribed to the political and legal district of Bielsko. According to the censuses conducted in 1880, 1890, 1900 and 1910 the population of the municipality grew from 809 in 1880 to 1502 in 1910 with the majority being native German-speakers (at least 863 or 79.4% in 1890 and at most 1042 or 83.6% in 1900, 1230 or 82.9% in 1900) accompanied by Polish-speaking minority (at least 111 or 13.7% in 1880, at most 223 or 20.4% in 1890, 254 or 17.1% in 1910). In terms of religion in 1910 the majority were Roman Catholics (897 or 59.8%), followed by Protestants (527 or 35%), Jews (75 or 5%) and 3 others. It was then considered to be a part of a German language island around Bielsko (German: Bielitz-Bialaer Sprachinsel).

In the late 19th century Mikuszowice Śląskie became a spa resort for Bielsko residents, in contradistinction to the more industrialized Mikuszowice Krakowskie.

=== After World War I ===
After the division of Cieszyn Silesia in 1920 Mikuszowice Śląskie also became a part of Poland. The villages were then administratively joined. The municipality was annexed by Nazi Germany at the beginning of World War II, after it they were restored to Poland. Afterwards they were intermittently separated. In 1957 Mikuszowice Śląskie gained a status of urban-type settlement. Mikuszowice became administratively a part of Bielsko-Biała in 1968.
