= Academy of Applied Sciences in Bielsko-Biała =

School in Poland

Coordinates: 49.8134°N 18.9989°E

The Academy of Applied Sciences in Bielsko-Biala (Akademia Nauk Stosowanych w Bielsku-Białej) is a school in Bielsko-Biała, Poland. Founded in 1995 as the Higher School of Banking and Finance, the name was changed to Higher School of Finance and Law in 2011, and to The Academy of Applied Sciences in 2023. Currently, the school offers courses in two departments and four different majors: Finance, Information Technology, Law, and Internal Security.
