= Pohar, Lviv Oblast =

Village in Lviv Oblast, Ukraine

Pohar Пога́р
- Village
- Location within Lviv Oblast
- Coordinates: 48°56′16″N 23°15′43″E
- Country: Ukraine
- Oblast: Lviv Oblast
- District: Stryi Raion
- Established: 1578

Area
  - Total: 21 km^{2} (8.1 sq mi)
- Elevation /(average value of): 716 m (2,349 ft)

Population
  - Total: ▼400
  - Density: 19,381/km^{2} (50,200/sq mi)
- Time zone: UTC+2 (EET)
  - Summer (DST): UTC+3 (EEST)
- Postal code: 82640
- Area code: +380 3251
- Website: село Погар ^{(Ukrainian)}

Pohar (Ukrainian: Пога́р) — village (selo) in Stryi Raion, Lviv Oblast, of Western Ukraine. Local government — Oriavska village council. It belongs to Kozova rural hromada, one of the hromadas of Ukraine. The village is located on the northern slopes of the Dovzhky Range (998 – 1056 m) at a distance 136 kilometres (85 mi) from the city of Lviv, 65 kilometres (40 mi) from Stryi, and 27 kilometres (17 mi) from Skole.

The first record of the village dates back to 1578.

Until 18 July 2020, Pohar belonged to Skole Raion. The raion was abolished in July 2020 as part of the administrative reform of Ukraine, which reduced the number of raions of Lviv Oblast to seven. The area of Skole Raion was merged into Stryi Raion.

== Literature ==
- Ukrainian: Історія міст і сіл УРСР : Львівська область. – К. : ГРУРЕ, 1968 р.
