= Zavadka, Stryi Raion, Lviv Oblast =

Village in Lviv Oblast, Ukraine

Zavadka, Skole Raion Завадка (Сколівський район)
- Village
- Location within Lviv Oblast
- Coordinates: 49°00′46″N 23°10′31″E
- Country: Ukraine
- Oblast: Lviv Oblast
- District: Stryi Raion
- Established: 1538

Area
  - Total: 246 km^{2} (95 sq mi)
- Elevation /(average value of): 700 m (2,300 ft)

Population
  - Total: 648
  - Density: 26,341/km^{2} (68,220/sq mi)
- Time zone: UTC+2 (EET)
  - Summer (DST): UTC+3 (EEST)
- Postal code: 82622
- Area code: +380 3251
- Website: село Завадка ^{(Ukrainian)}

Zavadka (Ukrainian: Зава́дка, Polish: Zawadka) is a small village (selo) in Stryi Raion, Lviv Oblast, of Western Ukraine. It belongs to Koziova rural hromada, one of the hromadas of Ukraine. The village has a population of about 648 persons, and its local government is administered by the Zavadkivska village council.

== Geography ==
The village is located in the mountains, far from the main road. It is in the Ukrainian Carpathians within the limits of the Eastern Beskids on the northern slopes of the ridge Dovzhky.
The village is small and covers an area of 2.46 km^{2}. It is situated at an altitude of 700 metres (2,300 ft) above sea level. Distance from the regional center Lviv is 148 kilometres (92 mi) , 40 kilometres (25 mi) from the district center Skole, and 16 kilometres (9.9 mi) from the village Oriava.

== History and attractions ==
The village was founded in 1538 and was originally known as Ilnychok.

Until 18 July 2020, Zavadka belonged to Skole Raion. The raion was abolished in July 2020 as part of the administrative reform of Ukraine, which reduced the number of raions of Lviv Oblast to seven. The area of Skole Raion was merged into Stryi Raion.

The village has an architectural monument of local importance in Stryi Raion; the wooden Cathedral Church of the Blessed Virgin Mary, built in 1887 (2914-M).

== Literature ==
- Історія міст і сіл УРСР : Львівська область, Завадка. – К. : ГРУРЕ, 1968 р. Page 716 (in Ukrainian)
