= Zhupany =

Village in Lviv Oblast, Ukraine

Zhupany Жупани Żupanie
- Village
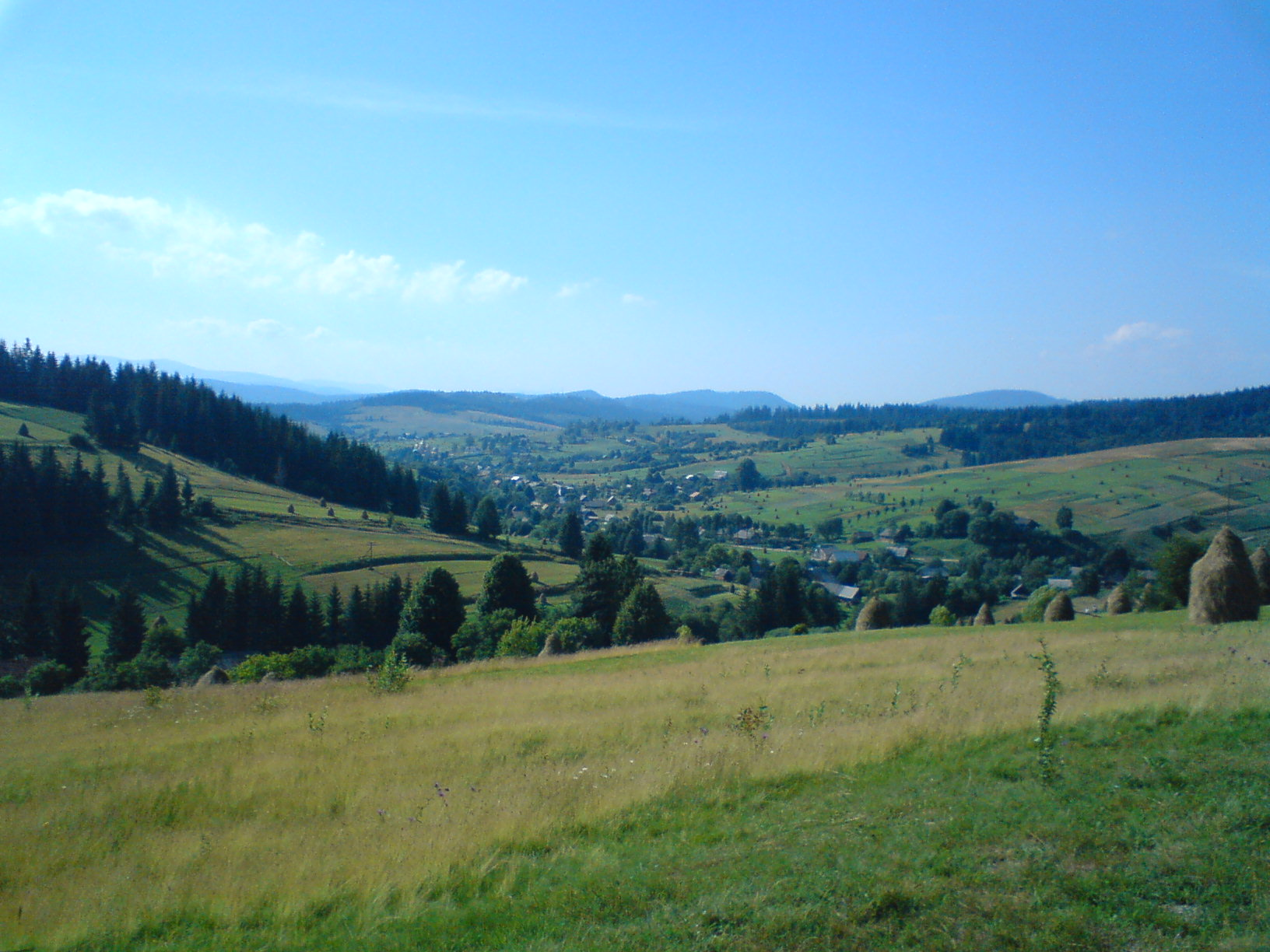

- Location within Lviv Oblast Location within Ukraine
- Coordinates: 48°48′12″N 23°11′25″E
- Country: Ukraine
- Oblast: Lviv Oblast
- Raion: Stryi Raion
- Established: 1515

Area
  - Total: 18 km^{2} (6.9 sq mi)
- Elevation /(average value of): 777 m (2,549 ft)

Population
  - Total: 986
  - Density: 560,230/km^{2} (1,451,000/sq mi)
- Time zone: UTC+2 (EET)
  - Summer (DST): UTC+3 (EEST)
- Postal code: 82651
- Area code: +380 3251
- Website: село Жупани ^{(Ukrainian)}

Zhupany (Ukrainian: Жупани́ or Жупа́нє, Polish: Żupanie) is a village (selo) in Stryi Raion, Lviv Oblast, of western Ukraine. It is located in the Ukrainian Carpathians, within the limits of the Eastern Beskids on the border of the Zakarpattia Oblast. Zhupany belongs to the Koziova rural hromada, one of the hromadas of Ukraine. The village has around 1277 inhabitants, and its local government is administered by the Zhupanivska village council.

== Geography ==
The village is located along the upper reaches of the Stryi River between mountains, close to Verecke Pass.
It is situated 153 kilometres (95 mi) from the regional center of Lviv, 44 kilometres (27 mi) from the district center Skole, and 115 kilometres (71 mi) from Uzhhorod.

== History and attractions ==
The first written mention of Zhupany dates back to 1515. In 1867, Zhupany was visited by Ivan Franko and Osyp Makovei.

Until 18 July 2020, Nyzhnie Synovydne was part of Skole Raion. The raion was abolished in July 2020 as part of the administrative reform of Ukraine, which reduced the number of raions of Lviv Oblast to seven. The area of Skole Raion was merged into Stryi Raion.

The village has an architectural monument of local importance of Stryi Raion, a wooden St. Michael the Archangel Church built in 1927 (2913-M).

== Literature ==
- Ukrainian: Історія міст і сіл УРСР : Львівська область. – К. : ГРУРЕ, 1968 р. Page 716
