= Oriavchyk =

Village in Lviv Oblast, Ukraine

Oriavchyk Орявчик
- Village
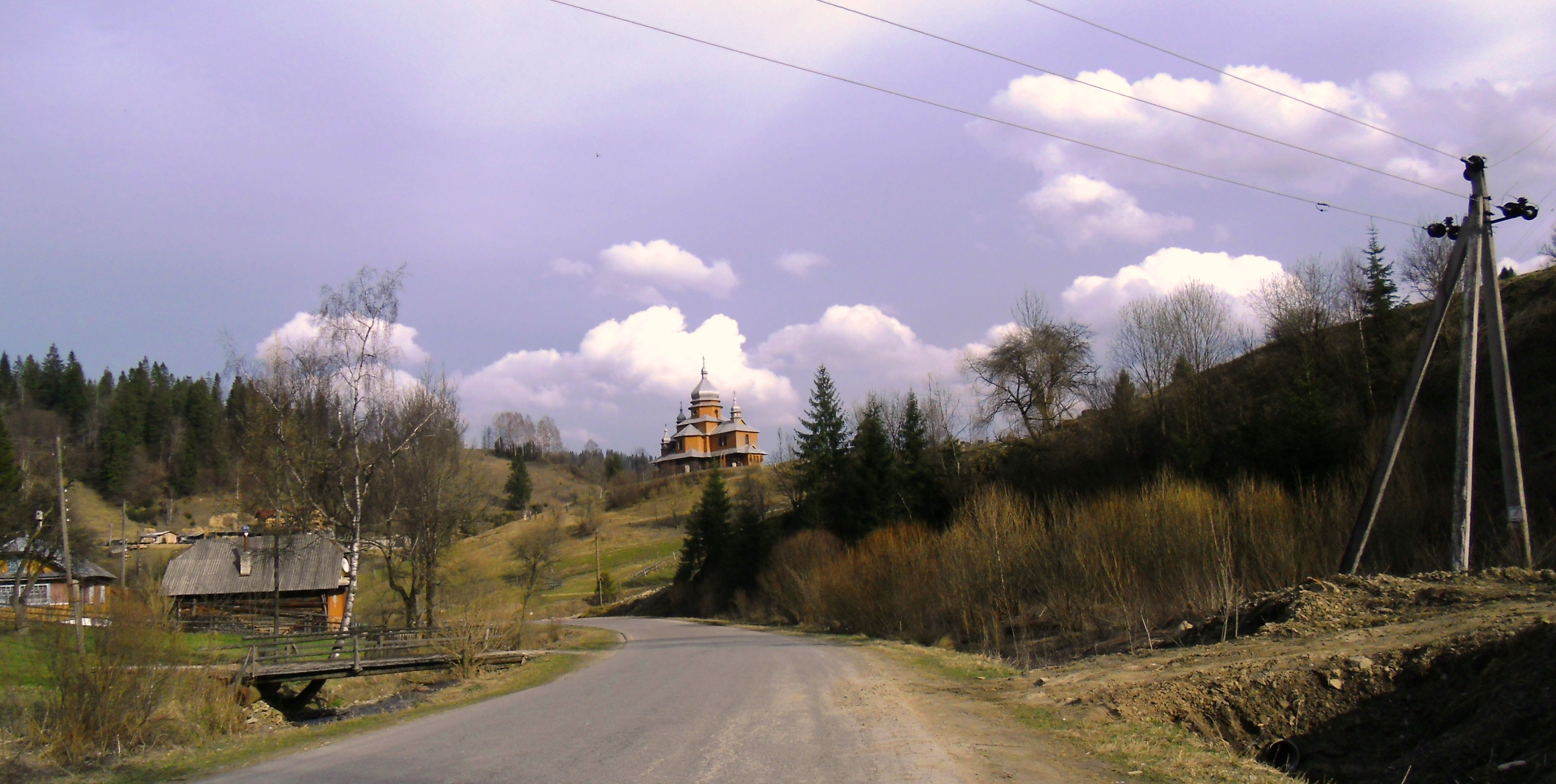
- Village Oryavchyk (Skole Raion).

- Location within Lviv Oblast
- Coordinates: 48°57′56″N 23°16′56″E
- Country: Ukraine
- Oblast: Lviv Oblast
- District: Stryi Raion
- Established: 1540

Area
  - Total: 118 km^{2} (46 sq mi)
- Elevation /(average value of): 819 m (2,687 ft)

Population
  - Total: 186
  - Density: 1,581/km^{2} (4,090/sq mi)
- Time zone: UTC+2 (EET)
  - Summer (DST): UTC+3 (EEST)
- Postal code: 82631
- Area code: +380 3251
- Website: село Орявчик ^{(Ukrainian)}

Oriavchyk (Ukrainian: Оря́вчик, Polish: Orawczyk) is a village (selo) in Stryi Raion, Lviv Oblast, of Western Ukraine. It is located in the Ukrainian Carpathians, within the Eastern Beskids. Oriavchyk belongs to the Koziova rural hromada, one of the hromadas of Ukraine. It is 133 kilometres (83 mi) from the city of Lviv, 24 kilometres (15 mi) from Skole, and 61 kilometres (38 mi) from Stryi. Local government is administered by the Kozivska village council.

The first written mention dates back to 1540.

Until 18 July 2020, Oriavchyk belonged to Skole Raion. The raion was abolished in July 2020 as part of Ukraine's administrative reform, which reduced the number of raions in Lviv Oblast to seven. The area of Skole Raion was merged into Stryi Raion.

== Attractions ==
The village has two designated monuments of architecture of Stryi Raion.

- Church of the Epiphany (Church of St. Luke) (wood ) 1862 (1417/ 1)
- The bell tower of the Epiphany Church (wood) 1801 (1417/ 2)
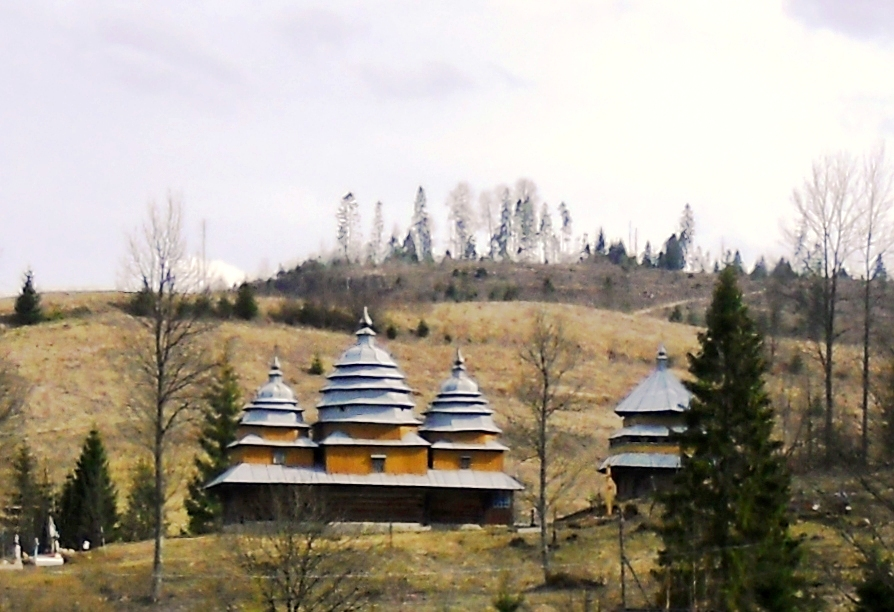
Oriavchyk. Church and bell tower of the Epiphany Church.

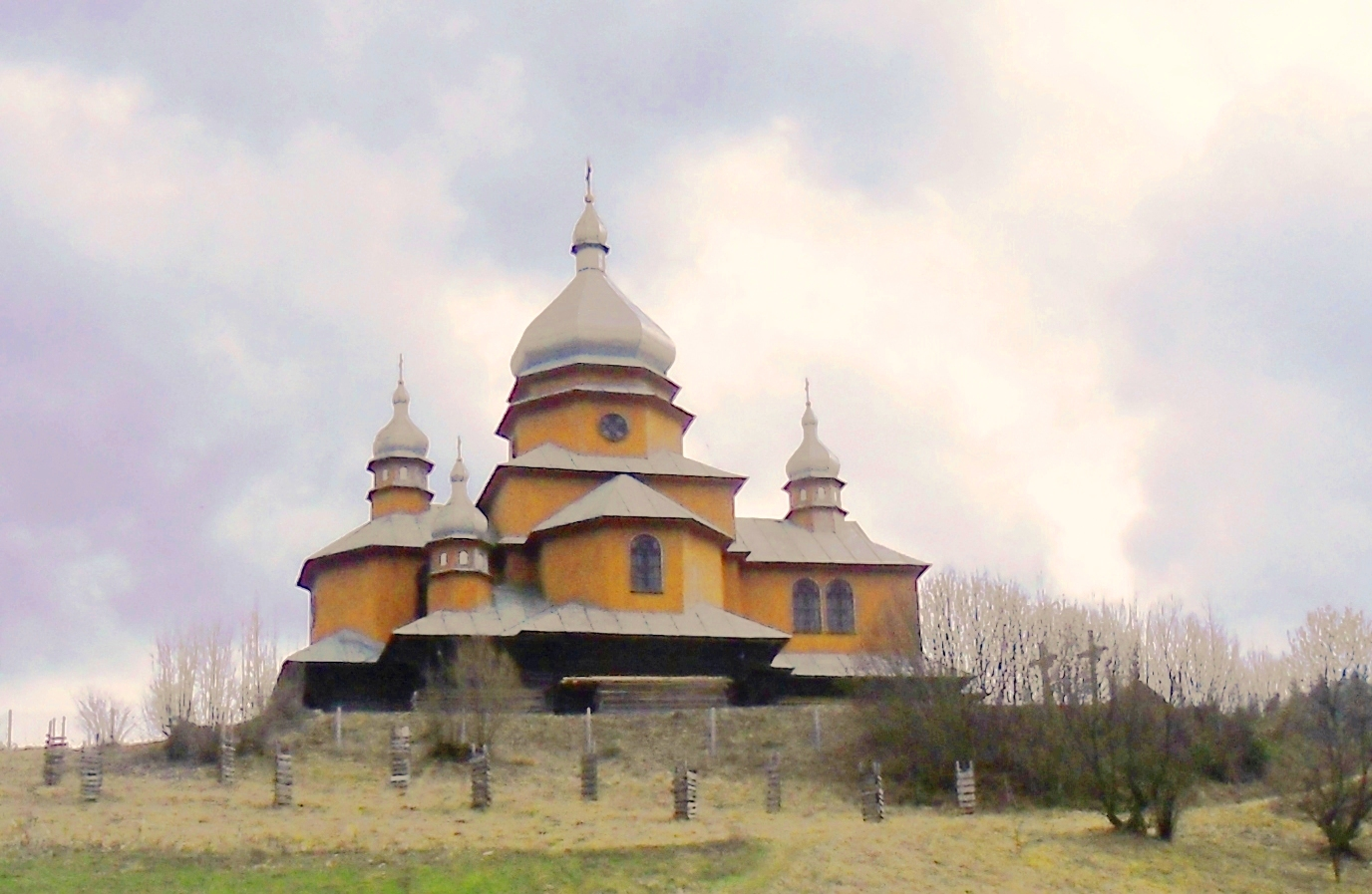
Oriavchyk. Church of St. Nicholas (1930).
