= Rosokhach, Lviv Oblast =

Village in Lviv Oblast, Ukraine

Rosokhach Росохач (Сколівський район)
- Village
- Location within Lviv Oblast
- Coordinates: 49°00′19″N 23°12′44″E
- Country: Ukraine
- Oblast: Lviv Oblast
- District: Stryi Raion
- Established: 1561

Area
  - Total: 161 km^{2} (62 sq mi)
- Elevation /(average value of): 707 m (2,320 ft)

Population
  - Total: 523
  - Density: 32,484/km^{2} (84,130/sq mi)
- Time zone: UTC+2 (EET)
  - Summer (DST): UTC+3 (EEST)
- Postal code: 82615
- Area code: +380 3251
- Website: Rosokhach Village

Rosokhach (Ukrainian: Росо́хач, Polish: Rosochacz, ancient name – Ukrainian: Росоха́тий По́тік) is a small village (selo) in Stryi Raion, Lviv Oblast (province) of Western Ukraine. It is part of the Koziova rural hromada, one of the hromadas of Ukraine. The village covers an area of 1,613 km^{2} and its population is about 523 residents. Local governance is administered by the Rosokhachska village council.

== Geography ==
The village is located deep in the Carpathian Mountains of Ukraine within the limits of the Eastern Beskids, on the northern slopes of the Mountain Ridge Dovzhky. It is situated 141 kilometres (88 mi) from the regional center Lviv, 32 kilometres (20 mi) from the district center Skole, and 153 kilometres (95 mi) from Uzhhorod.
The village is located on the riverbank of Zavadka, which flows into the Stryi river on the territory of the Sambir Raion.

== History and attractions ==
The first written mention of Rosochach dates back to 1561, during the colonization of Skole District in the 16th century.

Until 18 July 2020, Rosokhach was part of Skole Raion. The raion was abolished in July 2020 as part of the administrative reform of Ukraine, which reduced the number of raions of Lviv Oblast to seven. The area of Skole Raion was merged into Stryi Raion.

The village has one architectural monument of local importance in Stryi Raion; a wooden church of St. Archangel Michael, built in 1882.

== Literature ==
- Історія міст і сіл УРСР : Львівська область, Росохач. – К. : ГРУРЕ, 1968 р. Page 719 (in Ukrainian)
- «Каталог річок України» — Видавництво АН УРСР, Київ, 1957. (in Ukrainian)
