= Kryve, Stryi Raion, Lviv Oblast =

Village in Lviv Oblast, Ukraine

Kryve, Skole Raion Криве (Сколівський район)
- Village
- Location within Lviv Oblast
- Coordinates: 48°57′47″N 23°12′21″E
- Country: Ukraine
- Oblast: Lviv Oblast
- District: Stryi Raion
- Established: 1500

Area
  - Total: 097 km^{2} (37 sq mi)
- Elevation /(average value of): 766 m (2,513 ft)

Population
  - Total: 287
  - Density: 3.0/km^{2} (7.7/sq mi)
- Time zone: UTC+2 (EET)
  - Summer (DST): UTC+3 (EEST)
- Postal code: 82623
- Area code: +380 3251
- Website: село Довжки, райцентр Сколе ^{(Ukrainian)}

Kryve (Ukrainian: Криве́) is a small village (selo) in Stryi Raion, Lviv Oblast, of Western Ukraine. It belongs to the Koziova rural hromada, one of the hromadas of Ukraine. The village has a population of only 287 people, and the local government is administered by the Dovzhkivska village council.

== Geography ==
The village is located 4 kilometres (2.5 mi) from the village council in Dovzhky. It is northwest of the Highway M06 (Ukraine) ( M 06) at a distance 141 kilometres (88 mi) from the regional center of Lviv, 33 kilometres (21 mi) from the district center Skole and 145 kilometres (90 mi) from the city of Uzhhorod.

== History and Attractions ==
The date is considered the founding of the village is in 1500. The active settlement of the Skole region and the village Kryve is observed in the 16th century (1578).
In the village has an architectural monument of local importance of Stryi Raion — Church of St. Onuphrius (wooden) of the 18th century, (1494-М).

Until 18 July 2020, Kryve belonged to Skole Raion. The raion was abolished in July 2020 as part of the administrative reform of Ukraine, which reduced the number of raions of Lviv Oblast to seven. The area of Skole Raion was merged into Stryi Raion.
