= Tukholka =

Village in Lviv Oblast, Ukraine

Tukholka Тухолька
- Village
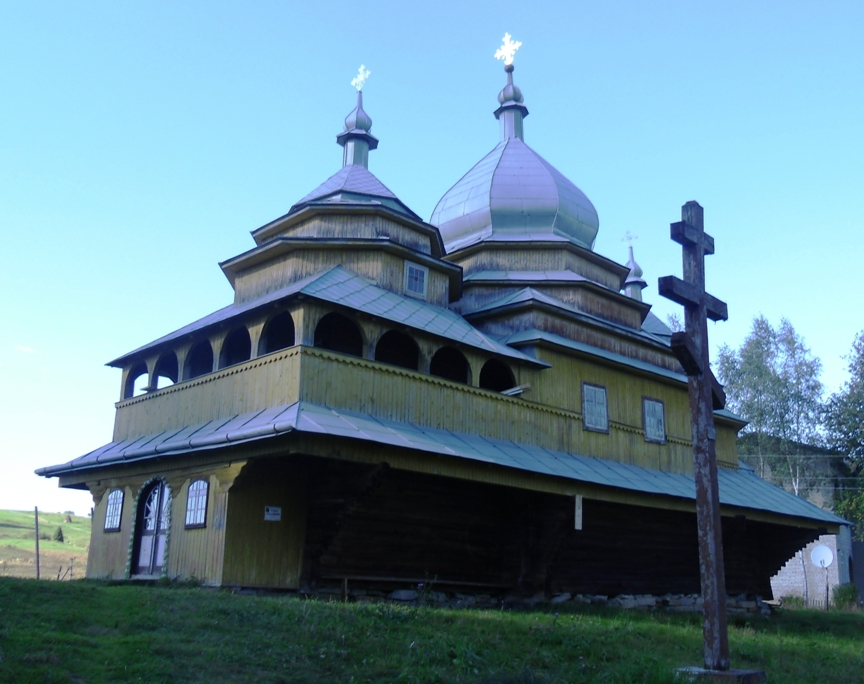
- Church of the Dormition (wood) (1858)

- Location within Lviv Oblast Location within Ukraine
- Coordinates: 48°52′36″N 23°16′56″E
- Country: Ukraine
- Oblast: Lviv Oblast
- Raion: Stryi Raion
- Hromada: Kozova rural hromada
- Area: 3,926 km^{2} (1,516 sq mi)
- Elevation: 731 m (2,398 ft)
- Population: 955
  - Density: 24,325/km^{2} (63,000/sq mi)
- Website: село Тухолька _{(Ukrainian)}

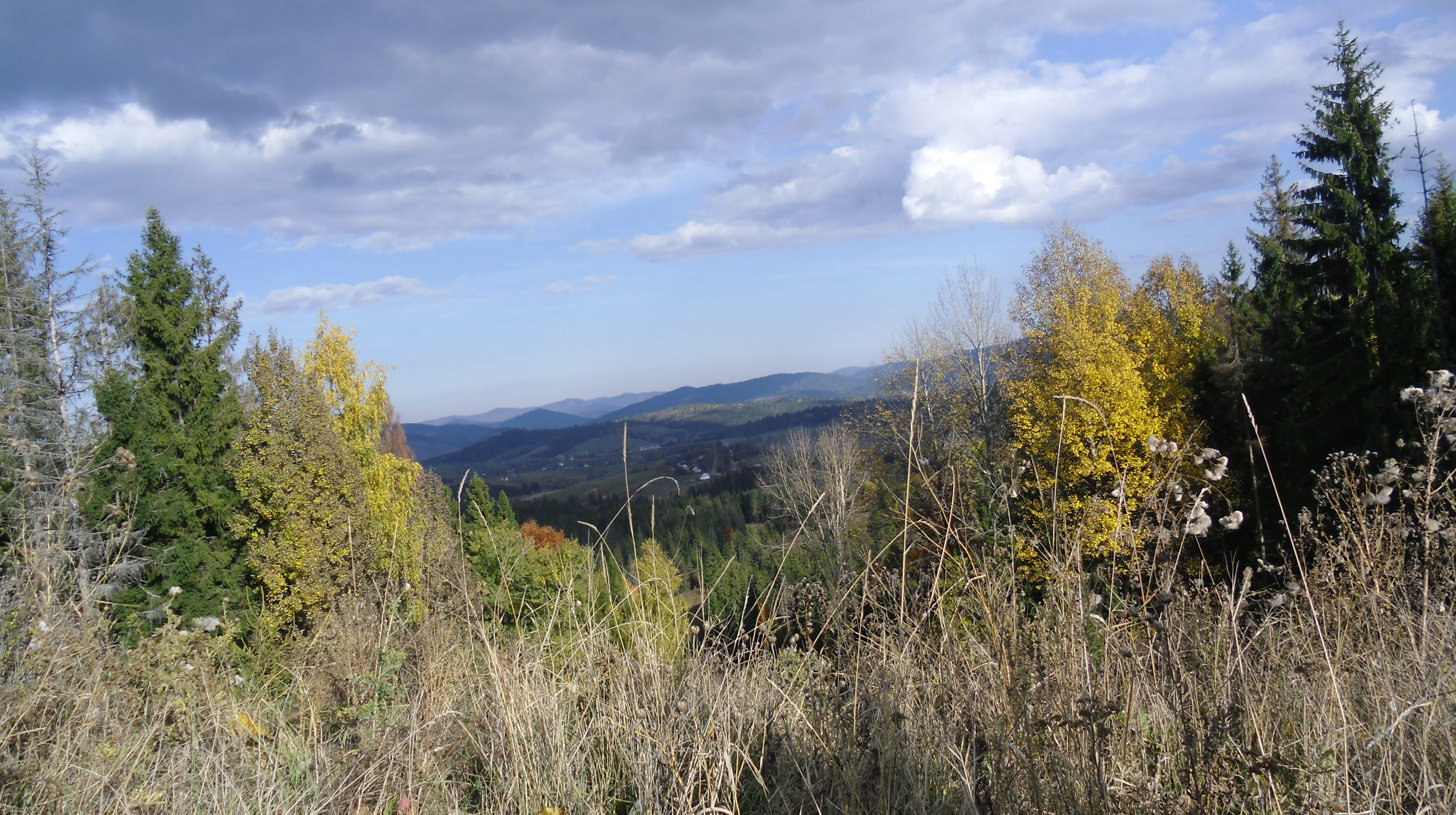
The village Tukholka, surrounded by the Eastern Beskids

Tukholka (Ukrainian: Тухолька, Polish: Tucholka) is a village (selo) in Stryi Raion, Lviv Oblast, in western Ukraine. The village Tukholka is located in the Ukrainian Carpathians within the limits of the Eastern Beskids (Skole Beskids) in southern Lviv Oblast. Remotely from Lviv on 131 km, from Skole — 28 km and from Uzhhorod — 131 km. The village is located in the river valley Brynivka. It belongs to Koziova rural hromada, one of the hromadas of Ukraine.

== History ==
The first written mention of the settlement dates back to 1552. The first settlers were farmers from the village Tukhlia.

Following the First Partition of Poland in 1772, the area of Tucholka became part of the Habsburg monarchy's Kingdom of Galicia and Lodomeria. Following the Peace of Schönbrunn in 1809, the area was ceded to the Russian Empire but was returned to the Habsburg monarchy as a result of the Congress of Vienna in 1815. After the dissolution of Austria-Hungary in 1918, the area briefly became part of the West Ukrainian People's Republic and ultimately of the Second Polish Republic. After the Soviet invasion of Poland in 1939, it was incorporated into the Ukrainian SSR. Following the invasion of the Soviet Union by Nazi Germany in summer 1941, the area was administrated as part of the General Government. When the Soviet Union retook the area in 1944, the region returned to the Ukrainian SSR. Since the dissolution of the Ukrainian SSR and the Soviet Union in 1991, the area has been part of independent Ukraine.

Until 18 July 2020, Tukholka belonged to Skole Raion. The raion was abolished in July 2020 as part of the administrative reform of Ukraine, which reduced the number of raions of Lviv Oblast to seven. The area of Skole Raion was merged into Stryi Raion.

A wooden church of the Dormition of Virgin (1858) is preserved in the village.

== People from Tukholka ==
- Mykola Dychkovskyi (1910–1985), village priest of Tukholka, repressed, was exiled to Vorkuta. Dean of city Stryi, the nephew of Cardinal Josyf Slipyj.

== Literature ==
- Ukrainian: М. Арендач. Село Плав'є: погляд крізь віки. Львів: Ініціатива, 2012–176 с. Редактор Ігор Дах.
