= Rykiv, Stryi Raion, Lviv Oblast =

Village in Lviv Oblast, Ukraine

Rykiv Ри́ків
- Village
- Location within Lviv Oblast
- Coordinates: 48°54′22″N 23°21′05″E
- Country: Ukraine
- Oblast: Lviv Oblast
- District: Stryi Raion
- Established: 1608

Area
  - Total: 064 km^{2} (25 sq mi)
- Elevation /(average value of): 648 m (2,126 ft)

Population
  - Total: 346
  - Density: 54,063/km^{2} (140,020/sq mi)
- Time zone: UTC+2 (EET)
  - Summer (DST): UTC+3 (EEST)
- Postal code: 82643
- Area code: +380 3251
- Website: село Риків ^{(Ukrainian)}

Rykiv (Ukrainian: Ри́ків, Polish: Ryków) is a village (selo) in Stryi Raion, Lviv Oblast (province) of western Ukraine. It is located in the Ukrainian Carpathians. Rykiv belongs to Koziova rural hromada, one of the hromadas of Ukraine. Local government — Rykivska village council.
The village is situated along the river Holovchanka (Khitarka, Vandrivka ) and is located at a distance 141 kilometres (88 mi) from the regional center of Lviv, 32 kilometres (20 mi) from the district center Skole, and 19 kilometres (12 mi) from the urban village Slavske.
The first record of the village dates back to 1608.

Until 18 July 2020, Rykiv belonged to Skole Raion. The raion was abolished in July 2020 as part of the administrative reform of Ukraine, which reduced the number of raions of Lviv Oblast to seven. The area of Skole Raion was merged into Stryi Raion.
