= Tysovets, Lviv Oblast =

Village in Lviv Oblast, Ukraine

Tysovets Тисовець
- Village
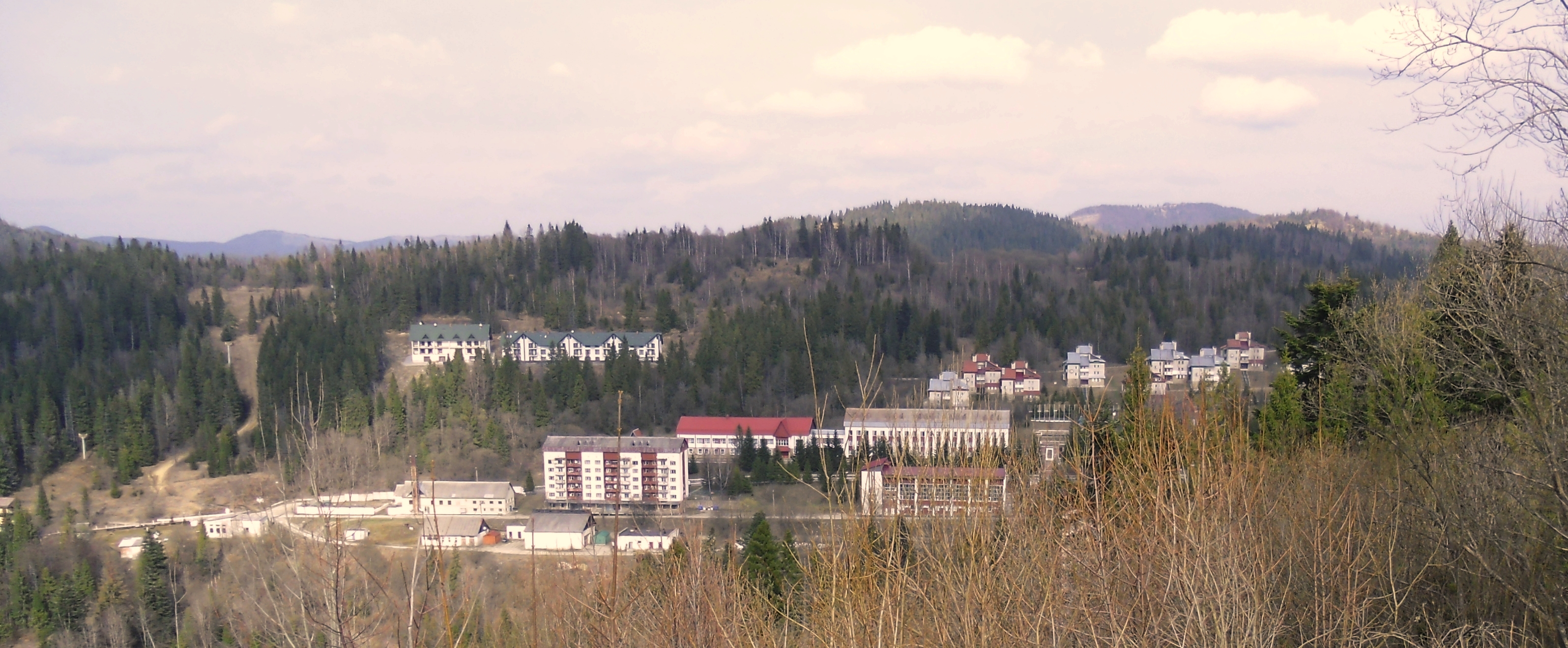

- Location within Lviv Oblast
- Coordinates: 48°58′56″N 23°16′45″E
- Country: Ukraine
- Oblast: Lviv Oblast
- District: Stryi Raion
- Established: 1538

Population (2001)
  - Total: 157
- Time zone: UTC+2 (EET)
  - Summer (DST): UTC+3 (EEST)
- Postal code: 82631
- Area code: +380 3251
- Website: http://rada.gov.ua/

Tysovets (Ukrainian: Тисовець, Polish: Tysowiec) is a village in Stryi Raion, Lviv Oblast in western Ukraine. It is a famous ski area and resort. Tysovets belongs to Koziova rural hromada, one of the hromadas of Ukraine.

Until 18 July 2020, Tysovets belonged to Skole Raion. The raion was abolished in July 2020 as part of the administrative reform of Ukraine, which reduced the number of raions of Lviv Oblast to seven. The area of Skole Raion was merged into Stryi Raion.

== See also ==
- Lviv bid for the 2022 Winter Olympics
