= Dovzhky =

Dovzhky (Ukrainian: Довжки) is toponym in Ukraine and it may refer to:

- Dovzhky Range, a mountain range in the Carpathians
- Dovzhky, Khmelnytskyi Oblast, a village in Shepetivka Raion, Khmelnytskyi Oblast
- Dovzhky, Lviv Oblast, a village in Stryi Raion, Lviv Oblast
