= Zadilske =

Village in Lviv Oblast, Ukraine

Zadilske Задільське
- Village
- Location within Lviv Oblast
- Coordinates: 48°59′31″N 23°08′05″E
- Country: Ukraine
- Oblast: Lviv Oblast
- District: Stryi Raion
- Established: 1537

Area
  - Total: 265 km^{2} (102 sq mi)
- Elevation /(average value of): 716 m (2,349 ft)

Population
  - Total: 662
  - Density: 24,981/km^{2} (64,700/sq mi)
- Time zone: UTC+2 (EET)
  - Summer (DST): UTC+3 (EEST)
- Postal code: 82621
- Area code: +380 3251
- Website: село Задільське (райцентр Сколе, облцентр Львів) ^{(Ukrainian)}

Zadilske (Ukrainian: Заді́льське, Polish: Zadzielsko) is a remote selo (village) in Stryi Raion, Lviv Oblast, of western Ukraine. It belongs to Koziova rural hromada, one of the hromadas of Ukraine. Local government is administered by Zadilska village council.

Until 18 July 2020, Zadilske belonged to Skole Raion. The raion was abolished in July 2020 as part of the administrative reform of Ukraine, which reduced the number of raions of Lviv Oblast to seven. The area of Skole Raion was merged into Stryi Raion.

== Geography ==
Zadilske is situated in the Carpathian Mountains. Distance from the regional center Lviv is 160 kilometres (99 mi), 52 kilometres (32 mi) from the city of Skole, and 129 kilometres (80 mi) from Uzhhorod.

== Religious structures ==
The village has an architectural monument of local importance of Stryi Raion – Church of St. Demetrios (wooden) 19th century (1495-M)
