= Verkhniachka, Lviv Oblast =

Village in Lviv Oblast, Ukraine

Verkhniachka Верхня́чка
- Village
- Location within Ukraine Location within Lviv Oblast
- Coordinates: 48°46′31″N 23°14′31″E
- Country: Ukraine
- Oblast: Lviv Oblast
- District: Stryi Raion
- Established: 1730

Area
  - Total: 174 km^{2} (67 sq mi)
- Elevation: 830 m (2,720 ft)

Population
  - Total: 939
  - Density: 5.40/km^{2} (14.0/sq mi)
- Time zone: UTC+2 (EET)
  - Summer (DST): UTC+3 (EEST)
- Postal code: 82654
- Area code: +380 3251
- Website: Верхнячка, райцентр Сколе ^{(Ukrainian)}

Verkhniachka (Ukrainian: Верхня́чка) is a small village in the Stryi Raion, Lviv Oblast, Western Ukraine (name to year 1954 - Ukrainian: Вижлів). It belongs to the Koziova rural hromada, one of the hromadas of Ukraine. The population of the village is roughly 939 people and the local government is administered by the Verkhniachkivska village council.

== Geography ==
The village is located in the Carpathian mountains of Ukraine within the limits of the Eastern Beskids, at an altitude of 830 metres (2,700 ft) above sea level, which gives the village a mountain climate.
It is 55 kilometres (34 mi) from Highway M06, 159 kilometres (99 mi) from the regional center Lviv, 51 kilometres (32 mi) from the district center Skole, and 151 kilometres (94 mi) from Uzhhorod.
The Stryi River originates on the outskirts of the village.

== History and Attractions ==
The first written record of the village dates to 1730 and its original name was Vyzliv (Ukrainian: Вижлів).

In the village is an architectural monument of local importance. It is a wooden Church of Annunciation Virgin, built in 1832.

Until 18 July 2020, Verkhniachka belonged to Skole Raion. The raion was abolished in July 2020 as part of the administrative reform of Ukraine, which reduced the number of raions of Lviv Oblast to seven. The area of Skole Raion was merged into Stryi Raion.

== Literature ==
- Історія міст і сіл УРСР : Львівська область, Сколівський район, Верхня́чка. – К. : ГРУРЕ, 1968 р. Page 715 (in Ukrainian)
