= Orava =

Orava or Orawa may refer to:

- Orava (region), a region in Slovakia and Poland
- Orava (river) in Slovakia
- Orava Castle, a castle in Slovakia
- Orava (reservoir), a reservoir in Slovakia
- Orava County, a historic administrative county of the Kingdom of Hungary
- Orava, Estonia, a village in Võru Parish, Võru County, Estonia
- Orava, Russia, an Estonian village in Novosibirsk Oblast, Russia
- Oriava, a village in western Ukraine
- Sakari Orava (born 1945), Finnish sports-medicine surgeon
- Pikku Orava, a Finnish artist character that resembles the Chipmunks
- Orawa, a classical music piece by Wojciech Kilar
