= Kozova, Lviv Oblast =

Kozova Козьова
- Village
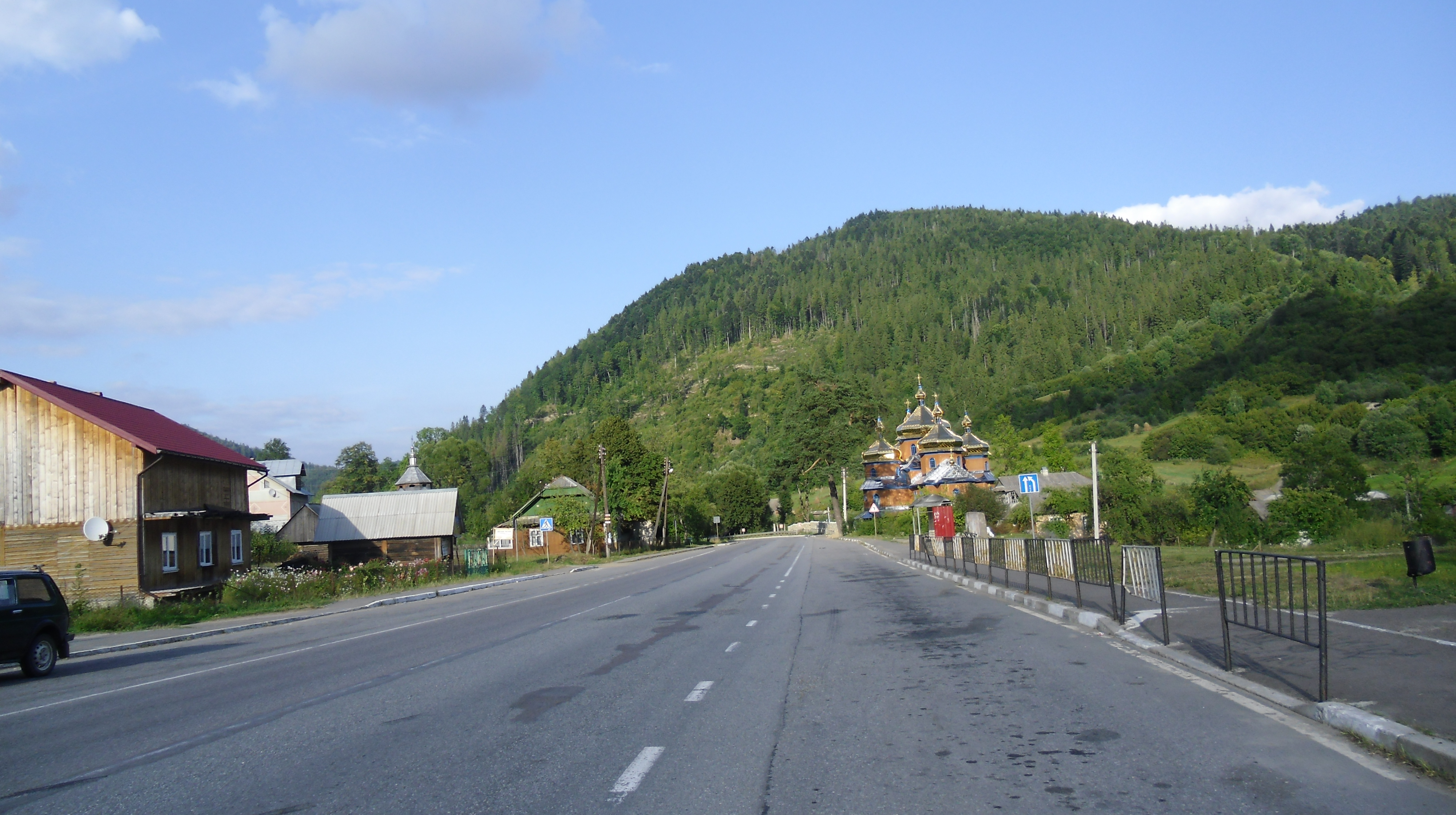

- Location within Ukraine Location within Lviv Oblast
- Coordinates: 48°57′03″N 23°20′43″E
- Country: Ukraine
- Oblast: Lviv Oblast
- Raion: Stryi Raion
- Hromada: Kozova rural hromada
- Established: 1538

Area
  - Total: 0,650 km^{2} (250 sq mi)
- Elevation /(average value of): 622 m (2,041 ft)

Population
  - Total: 960
- Time zone: UTC+2 (EET)
  - Summer (DST): UTC+3 (EEST)
- Postal code: 82631
- Area code: +380 3251
- Website: село Козьова ^{(Ukrainian)}

Kozova (Ukrainian: Козьова; Polish: Koziowa) is a village located in Stryi Raion (district) of Lviv Oblast (province) in Western Ukraine. It is located in the Ukrainian Carpathians, within the limits of the Eastern Beskids (Skole Beskids). Kozova hosts the administration of Kozova rural hromada, one of the hromadas of Ukraine. Local government is administered by the Kozova Village Council.

== History ==
The first written mention of Kozova dates from 1538. The first settlers were hiding in the mountains away from the Mongol invasion.

Until 18 July 2020, Kozova belonged to Skole Raion. The raion was abolished in July 2020 as part of the administrative reform of Ukraine, which reduced the number of raions of Lviv Oblast to seven. The area of Skole Raion was merged into Stryi Raion.

== Geography ==
The village is located along the Highway M06 (Ukraine) ( M 06). It is located along the Oriava River, and is surrounded on all sides by mountains and forests. The average height of the village is 622 metres (0.386 mi) above the sea level.

The village Kozova is situated 128 kilometres (80 mi) from the regional center Lviv, 19 kilometres (12 mi) from the district center Skole, and 140 kilometres (87 mi) from Uzhhorod.

== Attractions ==
In the village is an architectural monument of local importance to Skole Raion (Skole district). It is a wooden church of St. Nicholas, 1926.

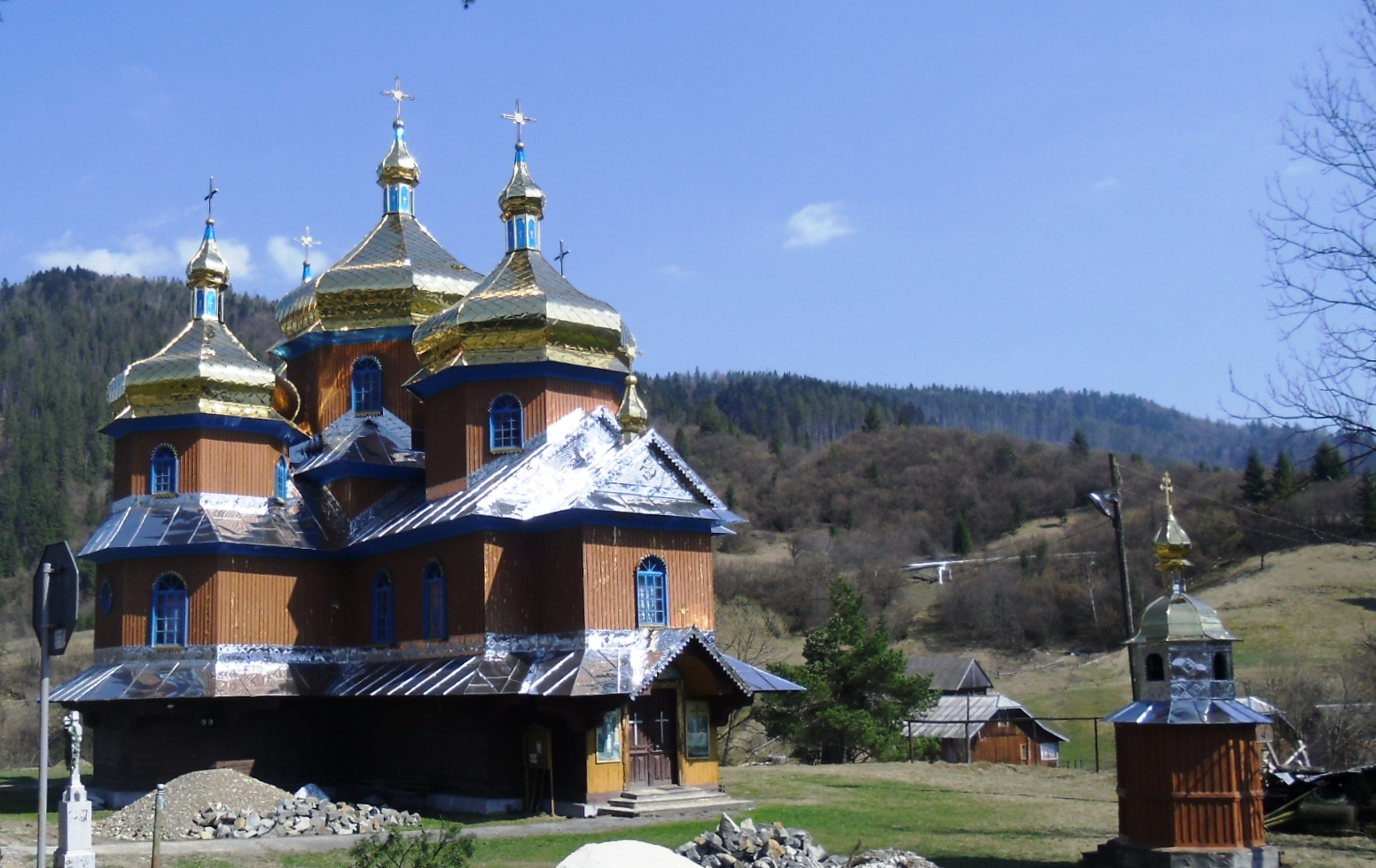
Wooden church of St. Nicholas (1926)

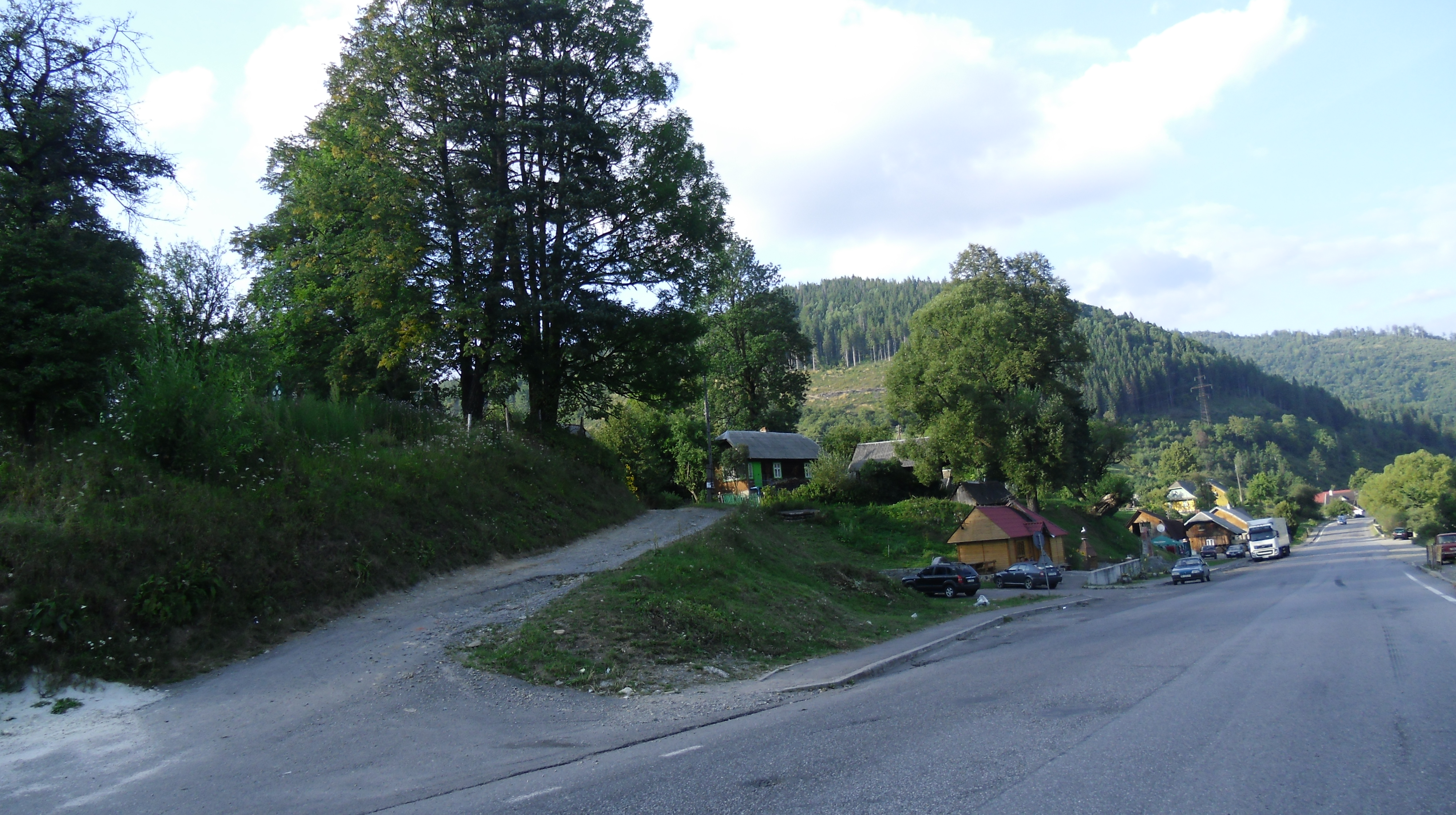
Carpathian village Kozova along the M06 Highway

== Literature ==
- Ukrainian: Історія міст і сіл УРСР : Львівська область. – К. : ГРУРЕ, 1968 р. Page 717.
