= Krasne, Stryi Raion, Lviv Oblast =

Krasne Красне
- Village
- Location within Lviv Oblast Location within Ukraine
- Coordinates: 48°56′38″N 23°09′50″E
- Country: Ukraine
- Oblast: Lviv
- Raion: Stryi
- Area: 2.7 km^{2} (1.0 sq mi)
- Population: 447
  - Density: 170/km^{2} (430/sq mi)

Krasne (Ukrainian: Красне, Polish: Krasne) is a village (selo) in Stryi Raion, Lviv Oblast, in south-west Ukraine. It belongs to Koziova rural hromada, one of the hromadas of Ukraine. It was mentioned as early as 1441, but Krasne was probably later depopulated, as it had to be resettled in 1556. The local Orthodox church was mentioned in 1670. The currently standing church in the village was built in 1933, according to a design of Jevhen Nahirny.

Until 18 July 2020, Krasne belonged to Turka Raion. The raion was abolished in July 2020 as part of the administrative reform of Ukraine, which reduced the number of raions of Lviv Oblast to seven. The area of Turka Raion was merged into Sambir Raion, however, Krasne was transferred to Stryi Raion.
