= Dovzhky, Lviv Oblast =

Village in Lviv Oblast, Ukraine

Dovzhky Довжки
- Village
- Location within Lviv Oblast
- Coordinates: 48°59′31″N 23°10′34″E
- Country: Ukraine
- Oblast: Lviv Oblast
- District: Stryi Raion
- Established: 1556

Area
  - Total: 263 km^{2} (102 sq mi)
- Elevation /(average value of): 726 m (2,382 ft)

Population
  - Total: 513
  - Density: 1.95/km^{2} (5.05/sq mi)
- Time zone: UTC+2 (EET)
  - Summer (DST): UTC+3 (EEST)
- Postal code: 82623
- Area code: +380 3251
- Website: село Довжки, райцентр Сколе ^{(Ukrainian)}

Dovzhky (Ukrainian: До́вжки, Polish: Dołżki) (previously known as Ukrainian: Малий Ільничок until the 16th century and as Ukrainian: Дольське until 1945) is a small Carpathian village (selo) in Stryi Raion, Lviv Oblast (province) of Western Ukraine. It belongs to Koziova rural hromada, one of the hromadas of Ukraine. The village has a population of about 513 people, and its local government is administered by the Dovzhkivska village council.

== Geography ==
The village is located on the slopes of the eponymous Mountain Ridge Dovzhky.

It is deep in the mountains in the northwest of the Highway M06 (Ukraine) ( M 06) at a distance of 145 kilometres (90 mi) from the regional center of Lviv, 37 kilometres (23 mi) from the district center Skole and 150 kilometres (93 mi) from the city of Uzhhorod.

== History and Attractions ==
The first written record of the village dates back to 1556. The first name of the village was Malyy Ilnychok, later - Dolske. After 1945 the village became known as Dovzhky.

Until 18 July 2020, Dovzhky belonged to Skole Raion. The raion was abolished in July 2020 as part of the administrative reform of Ukraine, which reduced the number of raions of Lviv Oblast to seven. The area of Skole Raion was merged into Stryi Raion.

In the village, there is one architectural monument of local importance to Stryi Raion. It is a wooden Church of the Entry of the Most Holy Mother of God into the Temple (1912) and a wooden Belltower.

== Literature ==
- Історія міст і сіл УРСР : Львівська область, Сколівський район, Довжки. – К. : ГРУРЕ, 1968 р. Page 716 (in Ukrainian)
