= Bat & Ryyd =

Finnish pop/rock band

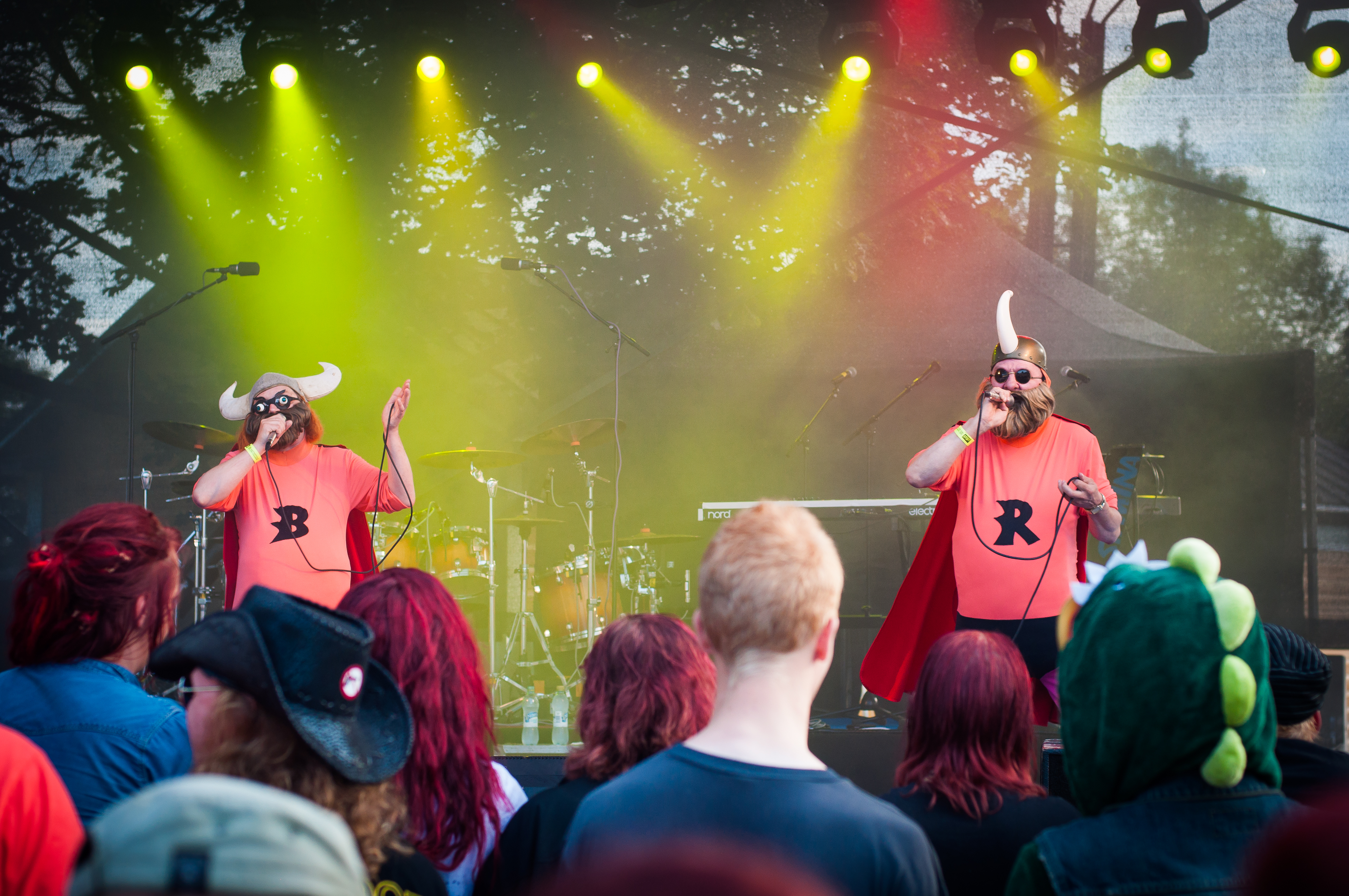
Bat & Ryyd at Rakuuna Rock in Lappeenranta in July 2014.

Bat & Ryyd is a Finnish band from Kemijärvi. The band was formed in the late 1980s and plays humorous electronic pop and rock music. The band's most famous songs include "Ehtaa tavaraa", "Lentävä puliukko" and "Fiilaten ja höyläten". The band's singing voices have been transposed into a higher pitch, similar to the Smurfs and Pikku-Orava records.

The band originally rose to fame in humorous broadcasts on the Lapin Radio station. The band was originally named Batman & Ryydman, but changed its name because of a complaint by composer Kari Rydman. Despite their musical clumsiness, the band's first self-published album Ehtaa tavaraa was awarded a platinum record in Finland. According to the Finnish music bureau, the band has sold over 52 thousand copies.

Later, Mr. Ryyd, one of the band's two members, had begun a solo career with his song "Sixpack", which is a parody of Tom Jones's song "Sex Bomb".

Although the band hasn't made any new music since 1998, they still perform live gigs.

== Members ==
- Juha Soppela
- DJ Trini (Timo Suhonen)
- DJ Tippa (Oiva Mursu)

== Discography ==
=== Albums ===
- Ehtaa tavaraa (Tippa 1989), rereleased on CD by Poptori in 2000
- Niin kallis on maa... (1991)
- Ryydimaa (1998)

=== Compilations ===
- Ryydimpää tavaraa (2002)

=== Singles ===
- Ehtaa tavaraa / Filmifestareilla (1989)
- Voi ryydana' / Petturi (1989)
- Ryydjoulu / Ryydjoulu (instrumental) (1989)
- Tapsa on vanki / Ryyd rock (1990)
- Rapula / Kurttupolkka (1990)
- Ya-ya-yaa / Ya-ya-yaa (instrumental) (1997)
