= Oriava =

Village in Lviv Oblast, Ukraine

Oriava Орява
- Village
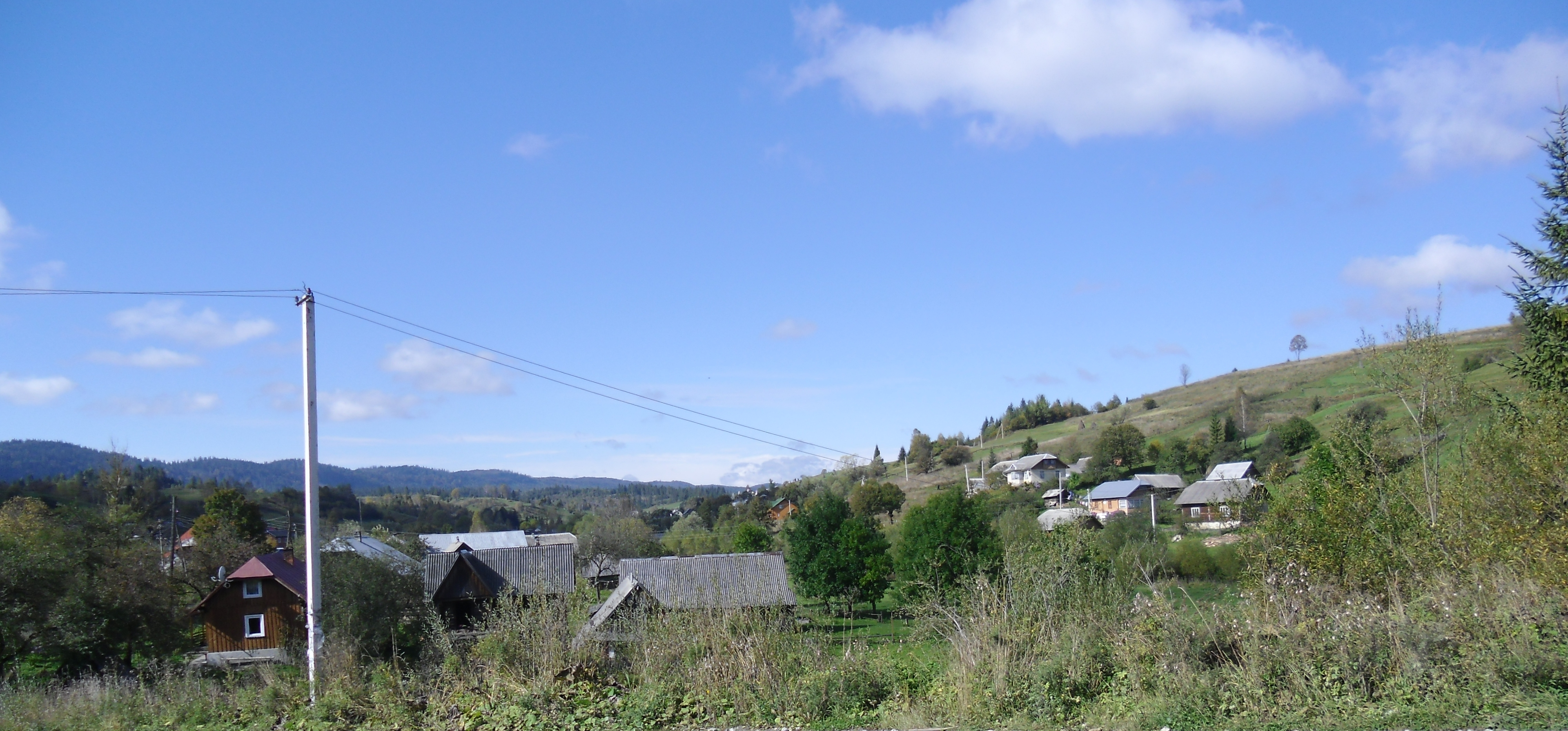
- The general view of village Oriava.

- Location within Lviv Oblast
- Coordinates: 48°55′18″N 23°17′44″E
- Country: Ukraine
- Oblast: Lviv Oblast
- District: Stryi Raion
- Established: 1574

Area
  - Total: 33 km^{2} (13 sq mi)
- Elevation /(average value of): 671 m (2,201 ft)

Population
  - Total: 523
  - Density: 19,182/km^{2} (49,680/sq mi)
- Time zone: UTC+2 (EET)
  - Summer (DST): UTC+3 (EEST)
- Postal code: 82640
- Area code: +380 3251
- Website: село Орява ^{(Ukrainian)}

Oriava (Ukrainian: Оря́ва, Polish: Orawa) is a village (selo) in Stryi Raion, Lviv Oblast, in Western Ukraine. The village of Oriava is located in the Ukrainian Carpathians, within the Eastern Beskids (Skole Beskids) in southern Lviv Oblast. It belongs to the Koziova rural hromada, one of the hromadas of Ukraine. The village is located along the river with the same name, Oriava.
It is 133 kilometres (83 mi) from the city of Lviv, 61 kilometres (38 mi) from Stryi, and 24 kilometres (15 mi) from Skole. Local government– Oriavska village council.

The first mention of Oriava dates back to 1574.

Until 18 July 2020, Oriava belonged to Skole Raion. The raion was abolished in July 2020 as part of the administrative reform of Ukraine, which reduced the number of raions of Lviv Oblast to seven. The area of Skole Raion was merged into Stryi Raion.

== Attractions ==
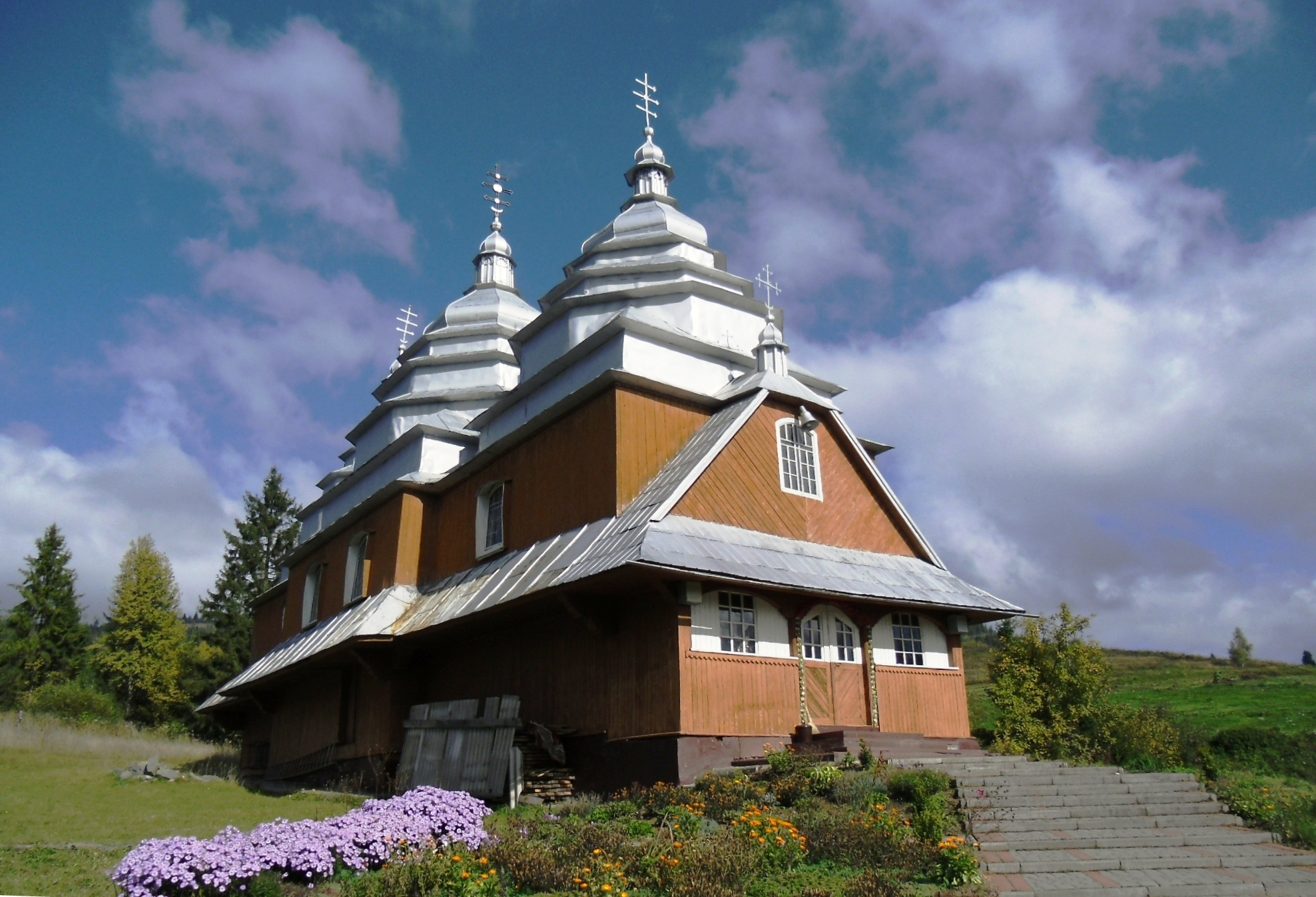
Church of the Nativity Blessed Virgin Mary (wood) 1882

The village has an architectural monument of local importance in Skole Raion (Skole district).

- Church of the Nativity Blessed Virgin Mary (wood), built in 1882 (formerly the Church of St. Arch. Michael).
