= Lviv bid for the 2022 Winter Olympics =

Bids for the 2022 Winter Olympics and Paralympics
Overview
- XXIV Olympic Winter Games; XIII Paralympic Winter Games

Details
- City: Lviv, Ukraine
- NOC: National Olympic Committee of Ukraine (UKR)

Previous Games hosted
- None

Lviv 2022 (Ukrainian: Львів 2022; Polish: Lwów 2022; Russian: Львов 2022; German: Lemberg 2022) was a bid by the city of Lviv and the National Olympic Committee of Ukraine for the 2022 Winter Olympics. Lviv withdrew its bid on 30 June 2014. The IOC ultimately selected Beijing as the host city for the 2022 Winter Olympics at the 128th IOC Session in Kuala Lumpur, Malaysia on 31 July 2015.

== History ==
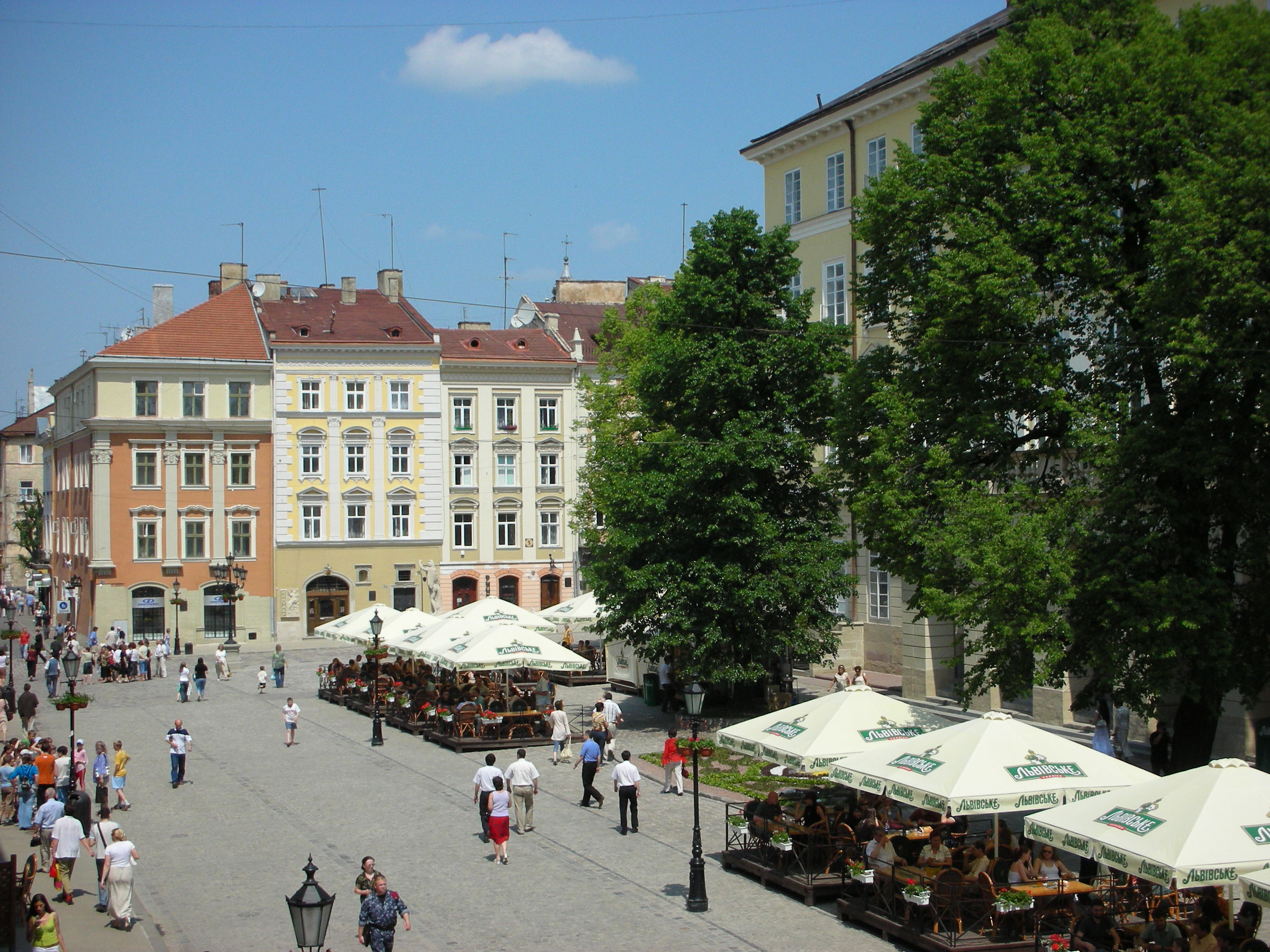
View of Rynok Square in Lviv

On 27 May 2010, President of Ukraine Viktor Yanukovych stated during a visit to Lviv that Ukraine "will start working on the official nomination of our country as the holder of the Winter Olympic Games in Carpathians". Ukraine's only previous experience in hosting Olympic events was during the 1980 Summer Olympics hosted by Moscow, when, as part of the Soviet Union, Ukraine held several football matches in Kyiv.

In September 2012, the government of Ukraine approved a document about the technical and economic feasibility of the national project "Olympic Hope 2022". This was announced by Vladyslav Kaskiv, the head of Ukraine's Derzhinvestproekt (state investment project). The organizers announced venue plans on their website featuring Lviv as the host city. The "ice sport" venue Volovets (around 185 km (115 mi) from Lviv) was proposed as the venue for the Alpine skiing competitions, and Tysovets (around 130 km (81 mi) from Lviv) as the venue for all other "snow sport" competitions. By March 2013 no preparations other than the feasibility study had been approved.

On 24 October 2013, the Lviv City Council adopted a resolution "About submission to the International Olympic Committee for nomination of city to participate in the procedure for determining the host city of Olympic and Paralympic Winter Games in 2022".

On 5 November 2013, it was confirmed that Lviv was bidding to host the 2022 Winter Olympics. Lviv would host the ice sport events, while the skiing events would be held in the Carpathian mountains. This was the first bid Ukraine had ever submitted for an Olympic Games.

On 30 June 2014, the International Olympic Committee announced that "Lviv will turn its attention to an Olympic bid for 2026, and not continue with its application for 2022. The decision comes as a result of the present political and economic circumstances in Ukraine."

Ukraine's Deputy Prime Minister Oleksandr Vilkul said that the Winter Games "will be an impetus not just for promotion of sports and tourism in Ukraine, but a very important component in the economic development of Ukraine, the attraction of the investments, the creation of new jobs, opening Ukraine to the world, returning Ukrainians working abroad to their motherland."

Lviv was one of the host cities of UEFA Euro 2012.

== Venues ==
Venue areas

The German companies Proprojekt and AS&P conducted a feasibility study for a Lviv bid in May 2012, which proposed to hold all events in two clusters. The Lviv Ice Zone would host all ice sports, including bobsleigh and luge, as well as the opening and closing ceremonies. The Tysovets Snow Zone and the Borzhava Alpine Area, both located in the Carpathian Mountains, would host the snow events.

=== City zone ===
The main Olympic Park would be centered around the Arena Lviv, hosting the opening and closing ceremonies. The Olympic Park would have two ice rinks (ice hockey, short track speed skating and figure skating), a temporary speed skating oval and a temporary curling rink. The Olympic Park would also host the Olympic Village and International Broadcast Centre. A second ice rink for hockey competitions would be located just to the north-west of the Olympic Park. A sliding track would also be built in the east of Lviv.

- Arena Lviv - opening and closing ceremonies
- Skating Arena - figure skating, short track
- Hockey Venue I - ice hockey
- Hockey Venue II - ice hockey
- Curling Sheet - curling
- Skating Oval - Speed skating
- Vynnyky Sliding Centre - Bobsleigh, luge, skeleton

=== Mountain zone ===
==== Venue cluster Tysovets-Panasivka ====
An existing military ski training facility in Tysovets, 139 km south of Lviv, along with two disused ski jumps, was proposed to be rebuilt to host all Nordic events. Additionally, a ski hill would be developed to host all of the snowboard and freestyle skiing events.

- Tysovets Nordic Arena - biathlon, cross country, Nordic combined
- Tysovets Jumping Hills - ski jumping, Nordic combined
- Panasivka Snow Park - freestyle, snowboard

==== Venue cluster Borzhava ====
A new alpine skiing centre, with a vertical drop of 900m, would be developed at Borzhava. It would include an alpine athletes' village and media accommodation.

- Borzhava Resort - Alpine skiing
