= Kozova rural hromada =

Hromada in Lviv Oblast, Ukraine

Kozova rural hromada Козівська сільська громада
- Hromada
- Interactive map of Kozova rural hromada
- Country: Ukraine
- Oblast: Lviv Oblast
- Raion: Stryi Raion
- Admin. center: Kozova

Area
  - Total: 4,209 km^{2} (1,625 sq mi)

Population (2021)
  - Total: 11,471
  - Density: 2.725/km^{2} (7.059/sq mi)
- CATOTTG code: UA46100090000076723
- Settlements: 24
- Villages: 24
- Website: kozivska-gromada.gov.ua

Kozova rural hromada (Ukrainian: Козівська сільська громада) is a hromada in Ukraine, in Stryi Raion of Lviv Oblast. The administrative center is the village of Kozova.

== Settlements ==
The hromada consists of 24 villages:

- Verkhniachka
- Dovzhky
- Dolynivka
- Zhupany
- Zavadka
- Zadilske
- Klymets
- Kozova
- Krasne
- Kryve
- Matkiv
- Myta
- Mokhnate
- Nahirne
- Oriava
- Oriavchyk
- Plavie
- Pohar
- Rykiv
- Rosokhach
- Smozhe
- Sukhyi Potik
- Tysovets
- Tukholka
