= Pikku Orava =

Pikku Orava (Finnish for Little Squirrel) is an animated singing squirrel, popular in Finland. Its album, Uusi Seedee reached number two in the Finnish album charts, and has achieved platinum status (30,000 sales). The songs are cover versions of popular Finnish songs, in a squeaky voice similar to The Chipmunks.

== Albums ==
- Uusi Seedee (2006)
- Uusi Seedee – gold edition (2CD, 2006)
- Kesä Seedee (2CD, 2007)
- Tosi Seedee (2007)
- Satu Seedee (2008)
