= Dovzhky Range =

Mountain range in Ukraine

Dovzhky mountain range (Ukrainian: Довжки) is located on the territory of Stryi-San Highland, which is located in Stryi Raion of Lviv Oblast, Ukraine. The ridge extends for over 16 kilometres (9.9 mi) from the village Plavie to the village Dovzhky.
Ridge Dovzhky height reaches 1,000 metres (3,300 ft)–1,050 metres (3,400 ft), maximum 1,056 metres (3,460 ft) (mountain Dovzhka). The surface of the Mountain Ridge Dovzhky is dissected by rivers valleys Oriava, Dovzhanka, Smozhanka and Krasnyanka, and covered with pine forests. The treeless surfaces are used for agricultural purposes.
The Mountain Ridge Dovzhky been announced as natural reserves "Dovzhky" (325,0 ha area) to preserve the oaks, spruce and beech. In the grass covering are uncommon species listed in the Red Book of Ukraine.

== Gallery ==
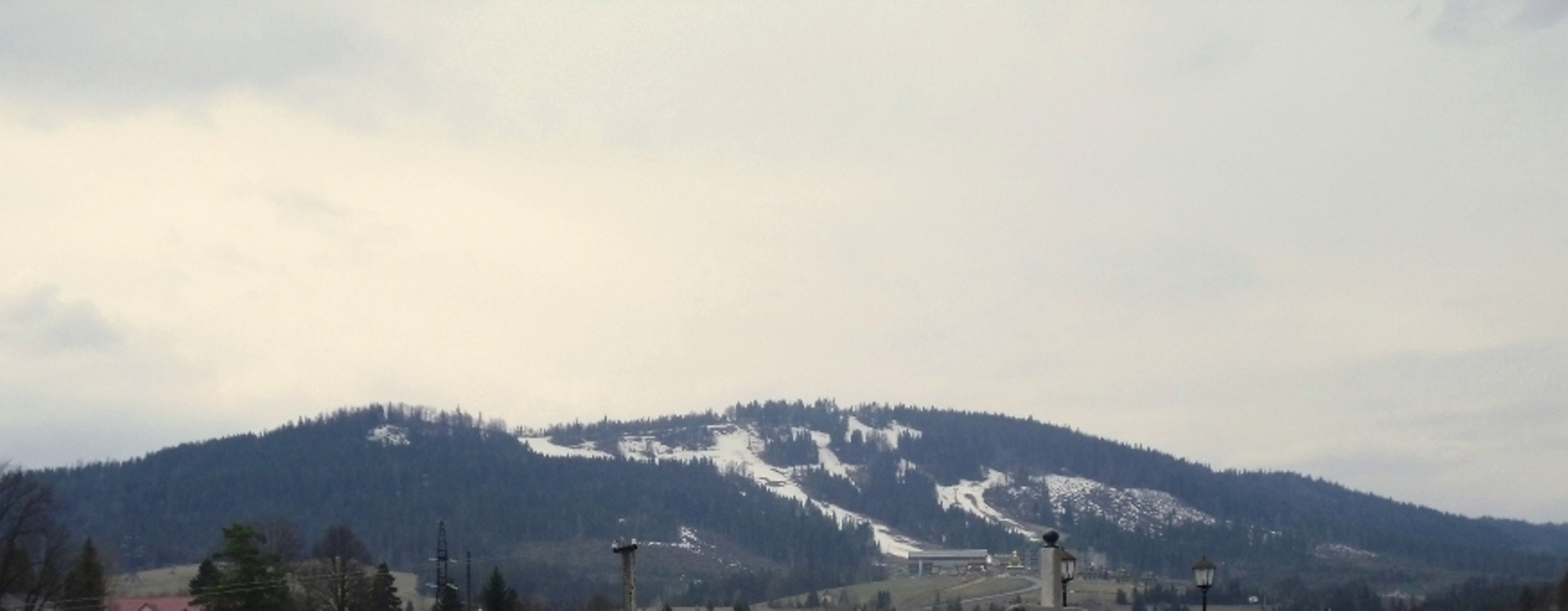
The Mountain Ridge Dovzhky in Skole Raion

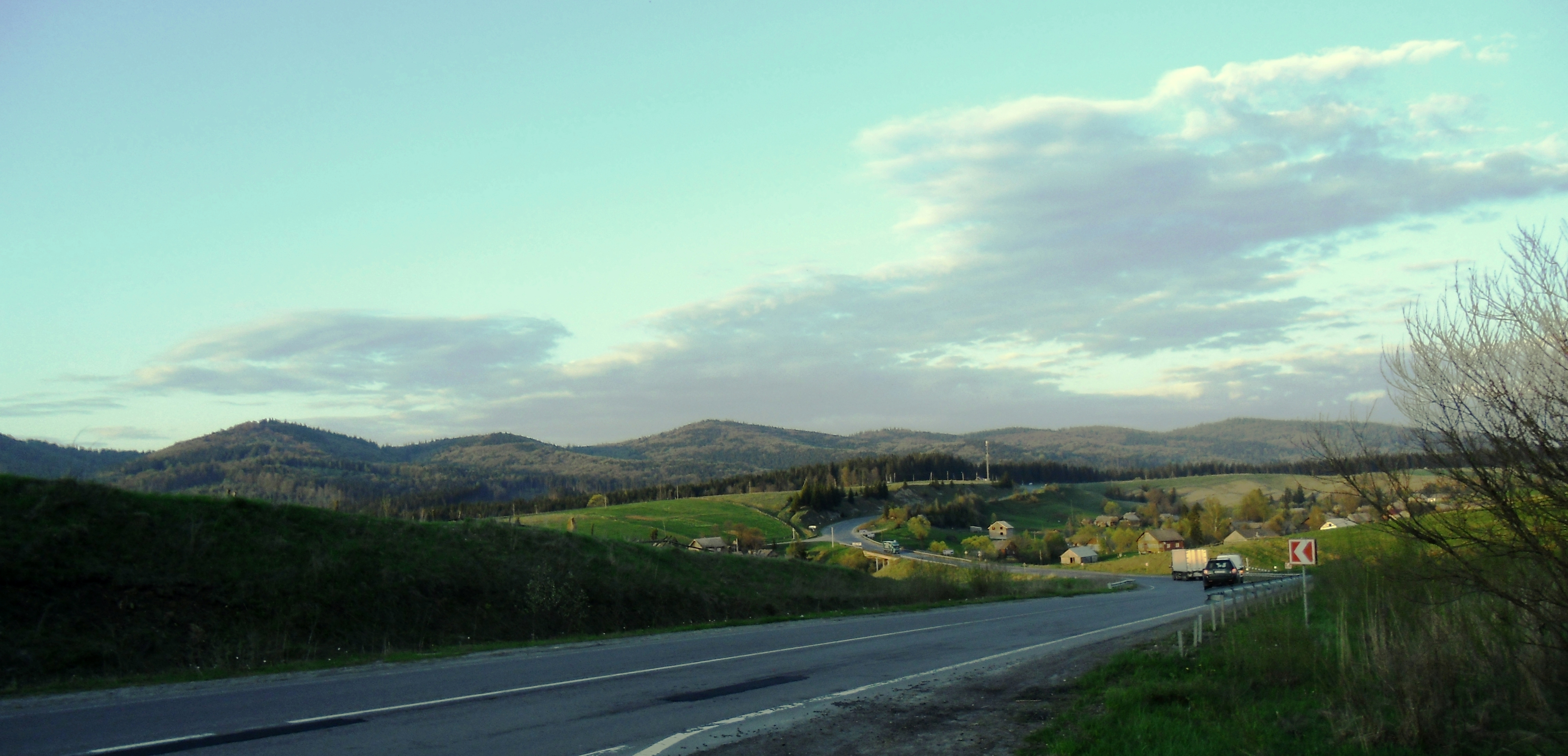
Southwestern Slopes of the ridge Dovzhky
