= Ukrainian Carpathians =

Mountain range

Coordinates: 48.1603°N 24.5003°E

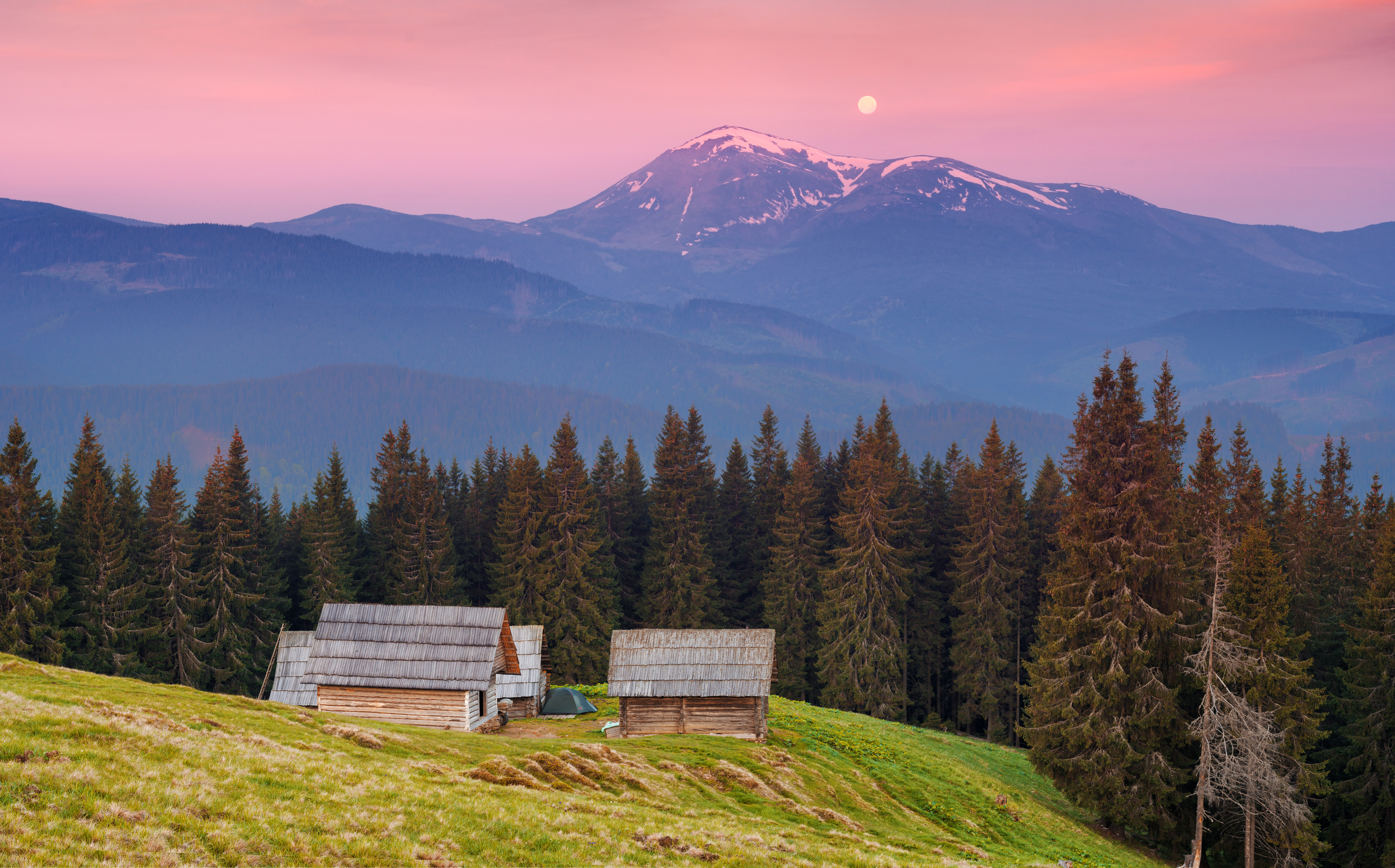
Ukrainian Carpathians (Carpathian Biosphere Reserve)

The Ukrainian Carpathians (Ukrainian: Українські Карпати, romanized: Ukrainski Karpaty) are a section of the Eastern Carpathians, within the borders of modern Ukraine. They are located in the southwestern corner of Western Ukraine, within administrative territories of four Ukrainian regions (oblasts), covering northeastern part of Zakarpattia Oblast, southwestern part of Lviv Oblast, southern half of Ivano-Frankivsk Oblast and western half of Chernivtsi Oblast.

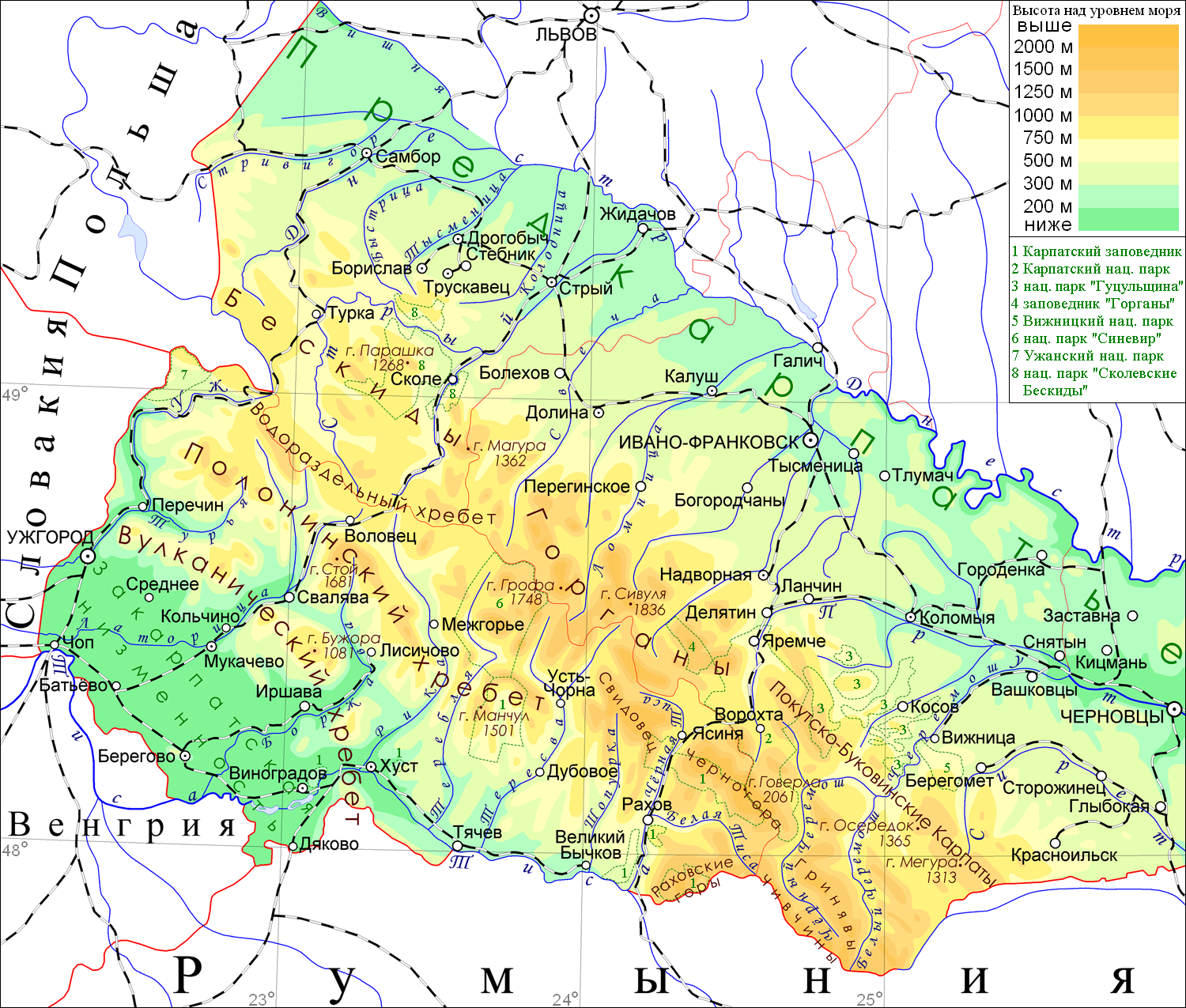
Ukrainian Carpathians topographic map

They are stretching in a general northwest–southeast direction, starting at the tripartite border point of Ukraine with Poland and Slovakia, and continuing towards the Ukrainian border with Romania. In terms of geological classification, Ukrainian Carpathians belong to two distinctive categories, with the major part belonging to the Outer Eastern Carpathians and the minor part to the Inner Eastern Carpathians.

Within different regional and national traditions, there are several overlapping variants of divisions and designations for various Eastern Carpathian mountain ranges. Within the wider scope of the Ukrainian Carpathians, a section of the Outer Eastern Carpathians spanning the southeastern corner of Poland, the northeastern corner of Slovakia, and the western part of Ukraine is commonly known as the Eastern Beskids (Ukrainian: Східні Бескиди; Polish: Beskidy Wschodnie), while in Slovakia the term Meadowed Mountains (Slovak: Poloniny) is also used for the same mountain range. The scope of those terms varies in accordance with different traditions and classifications.

== Geology ==
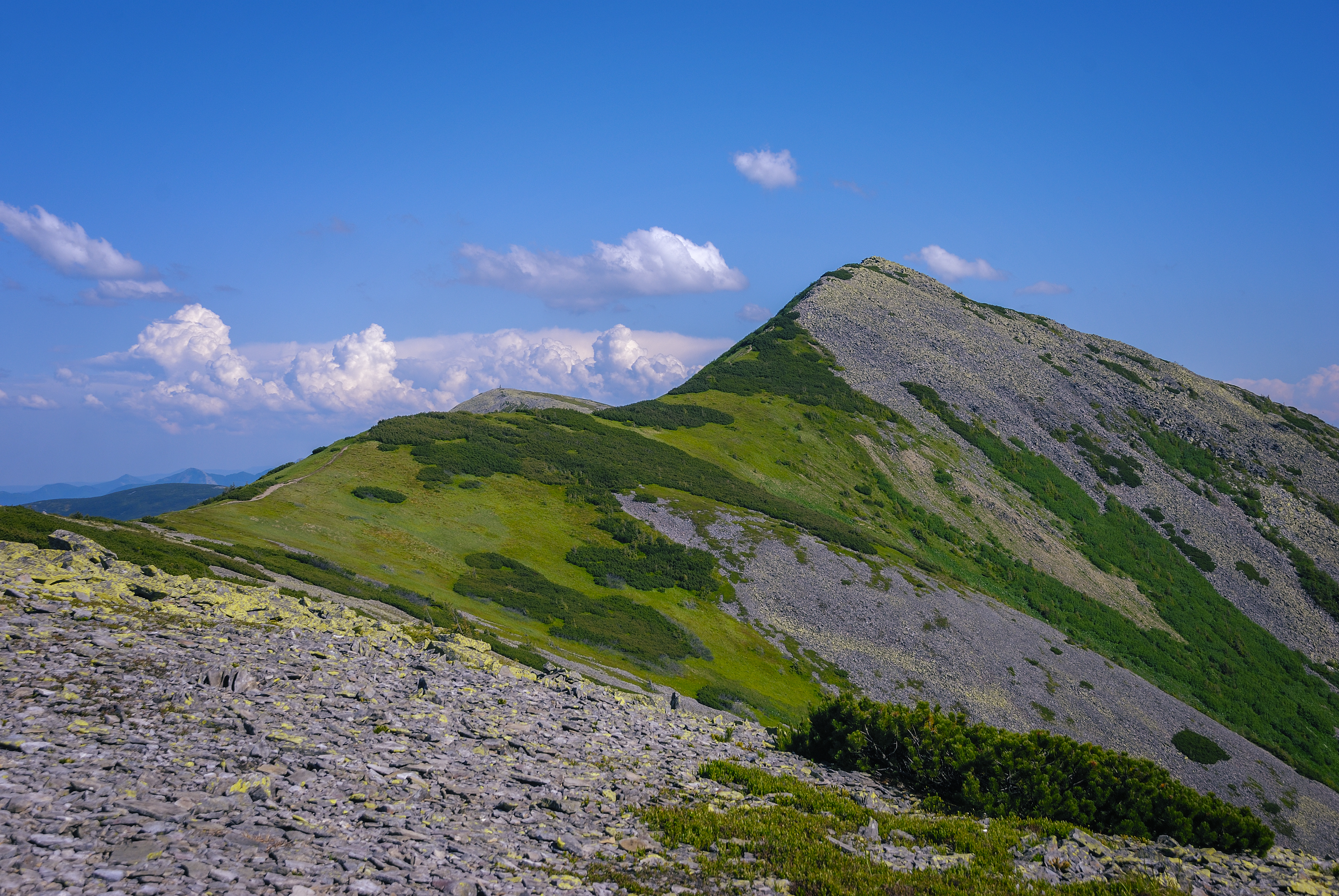
Debris fields on Syvulia mountain in Gorgany

Like other parts of Eastern Carpathians, Ukrainian Carpathians emerged during the Palaeozoic era. The original range, known as Proto-Carpathians, formed as a result of Caledonian and Variscan orogeny during the Silurian and Carboniferous eras, but was later covered by waters of the Tethys Ocean; its remains form the core of modern-day Marmaros-Bukovina upland. Starting from the upper Cretaceous period, the area was covered with sandstone, clay and other sediment, being located on the bottom of a sea. The mountain range reemerged during the upper Oligocene and Miocene, with the surrounding Prykarpattia and Pannonian Plain remaining part of marine basins. Miocene also saw a rise in volcanic activity, which continued until the early Pliocene. Quaternary period saw partial glaciation of the range during the Riss and Würm epochs.

The Eastern Carpathian range consists of four structural zones which run in parallel of each other in a northwest-southeast direction. The outer anticline has a width of 40 kilometers and consists of Cretaceous and Paleogene sediments, which form numerous folds pushed in the direction of Prykarpattia. The syncline zone further south is 30-40 kilometers wide and is formed by intensely folded Oligocene sediment. The internal anticline is mostly built of crystalline rock, but Triassic and Jurassic sediments are also present to a lesser degree; this area also contains numerous folds and dissections. The fourth zone, separated from the rest of the range by several valleys and lowlands, is built from volcanic rock. Additionally, there are several geological rifts running across the range, whose direction is frequently followed by local rivers.

The landscape of Ukrainian Carpathians is typical for middle-height mountains, with broad and gentle ranges divided by shallow longitudinal valleys and deep transversal rifts with steep curbs. Only certain elevated areas present features of higland landscape resulting from glaciation, such as debris fields, but even their highest points are covered with clays and vegetation.

== Geography ==
=== Subdivisions ===
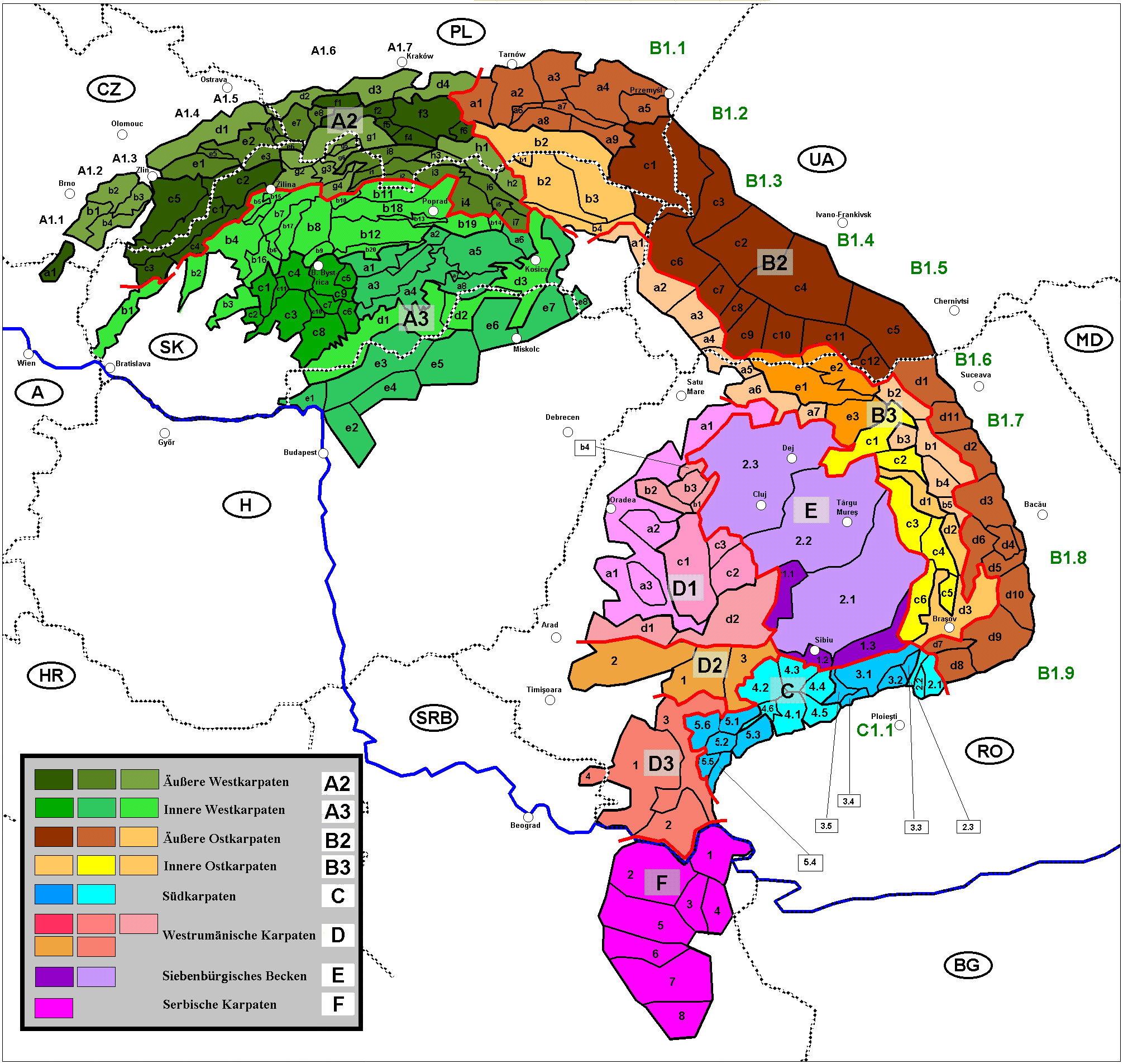
Divisions of the Carpathians, including sections in Ukraine

Divisions of the Outer Eastern Carpathians, including sections in Ukraine

Section of the Outer Eastern Carpathians, within Ukraine:

Wooded Beskids (UA: Лісисті Бескиди):

- Bieszczady Mountains (UK: Бещади); eastern section belongs to Ukraine → c1
- Sanok-Turka Mountains (UK: Верхньодністровські Бескиди); eastern section belongs to Ukraine → c3
- Skole Beskids (UA: Сколівські Бескиди) → c2
- Gorgany (UA: Ґорґани) → c4
- Pokuttia-Bucovina Beskids (UA: Покутсько-Буковинські Карпати) → c5

Polonynian Beskids (UA: Полонинські Бескиди):

- Smooth Polonyna (UK: Полонина Рівна) → c6
- Polonyna Borzhava (UK: Полонина Боржава) → c7
- Polonyna Kuk (UK: Полонина Кук) → c8
- Red Polonyna (UK: Полонина Красна)→ c9
- Svydovets (UK: Свидівець) → c10
- Chornohora (UK: Чорногора) → c11
- Hrynyavy Mountains (UK: Гриняви) → c12

Section of the Inner Eastern Carpathians, within Ukraine:

- Vihorlat Mountains (UA: Вигорлат) in Slovakia and Ukraine → (B3a1)
- Makovytsia (UA: Маковиця) → (B3a2)
- Velikyi Dil (UA: Великий Діл) → (B3a3)
- Tupyi (UA: Тупий) → (B3a4)
- Oaș Mountains (UA: Оаш гори) in Ukraine and Romania → (B3a5)
- Maramureș Lowland (UA: Мармароська улоговина) in Ukraine and Romania → (B3e1)
- Maramureș Mountains (UA: Мармароський масив) in Ukraine and Romania → (B3e2)

=== Mountain passes ===
- Uzhok Pass (889 meters)
- Veretskyi Pass (841 meters)
- Yablunytsia Pass (931 meters)

== Climate and nature ==
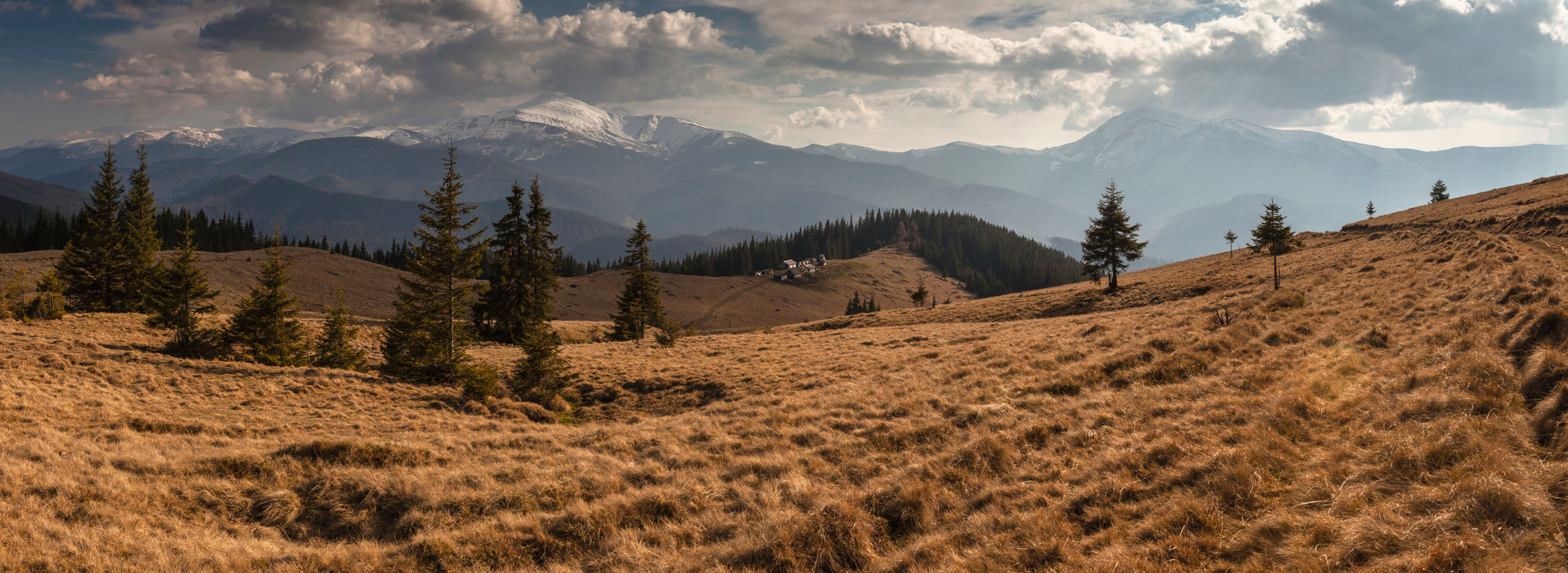
View of Hoverla and Petros mountains from a nearby polonyna

The climate of Ukrainian Carpathians is generally characterized by cloudy, rainy summers and relatively dry, sunny winters. Average temperatures and annual rainfall fluctuate significantly dependent on elevation. The wettest areas are located in the upper valleys of Teresva and Tereblia rivers; the inner longitudinal valleys are, in their turn, relatively dry. Average summer temperatures increase by 1-2 degrees Celsius in southeastern direction. Local phenomena include foehn winds and inversion of temperature between valleys and slopes during winter months.

The composition of soils in Ukrainian Carpathians varies depending on elevation, composition of rock and vegetation. The most widespread soil type in the range is brown earth of forest type, whose fertility is generally low. The soils on southern slopes of Volcanic Carpathians are more fertile in comparison. In river valleys meadow soils are widespread, and elevated areas without forest cover also contain peat soils.

The vegetation of Ukrainian Carpathians is generally richer than in Western Carpathians, and includes numerous plants of Balkan and Transylvanian origin, as well as some endemic species. The lowest elevations are covered with broadleaf and mixed forests along with large spaces of cultivated land. Above the line of 500-600 meters much of the area is covered with beech forests, especially in Transcarpathia. Above the line of 1,100-1,200 meters coniferous forests prevail. The territories above the elevation of 1,450-1,600 meters are covered with alpine meadows, locally known as polonynas, which cover all major ranges of Ukrainian Carpathians except of the Gorgany. The vegetation of uppermost areas increases in variety in eastward direction.

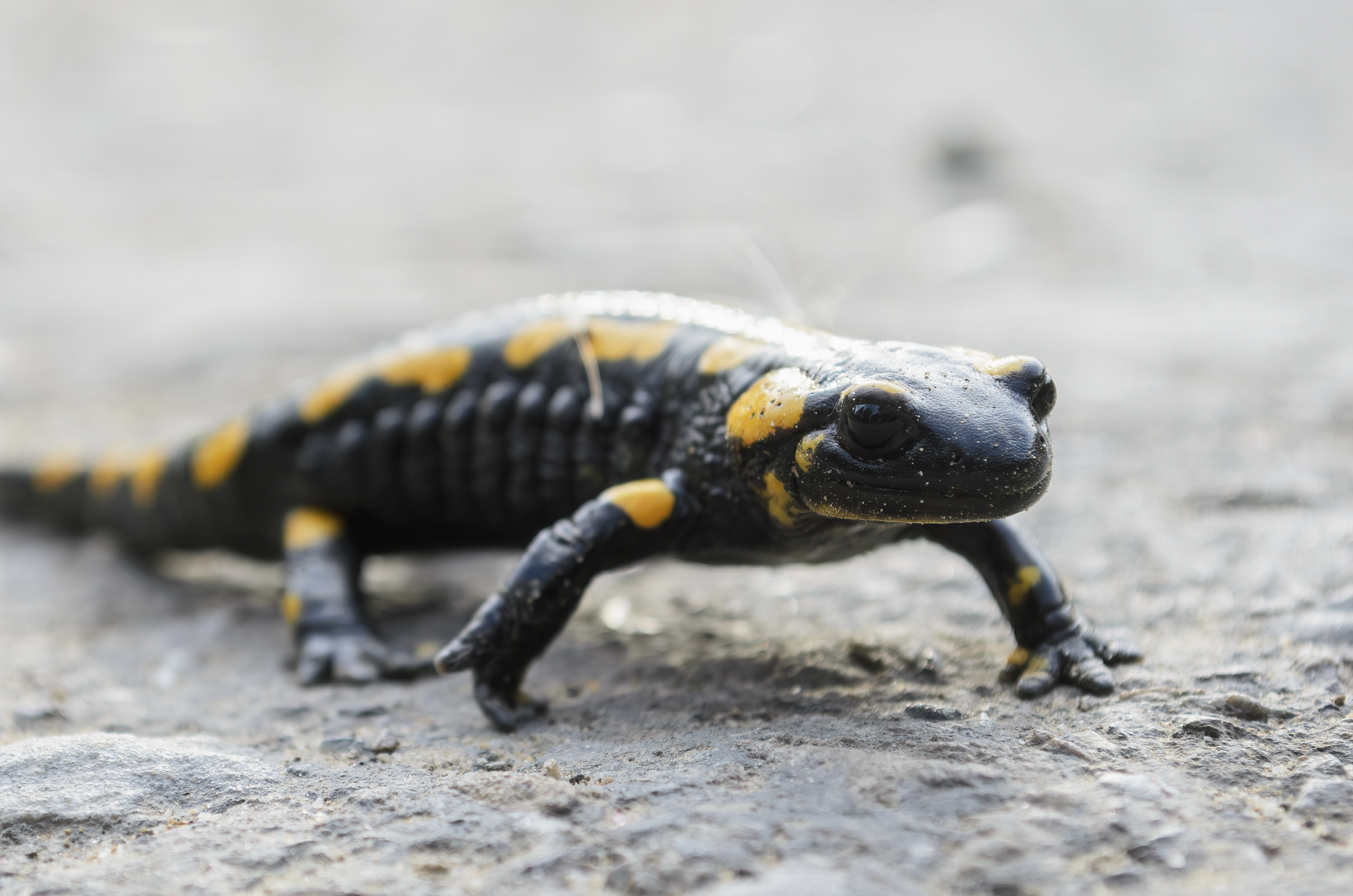
A fire salamander (Salamandra salamandra) on a street of Yaremche

The majority of fauna in Ukrainian Carpathians is represented by typical European species, of which brown bear and European wildcat are becoming increasingly rare. Many birds stay on the range exclusively during the summer period. Subalpine areas are home to characteristic species such as alpine shrew and European snow vole, meanwhile mountain forests contain some taiga fauna, for example blackcock and lynx. Especially on the southern slopes, a large variety of reptiles and amphibians is present, among them Carpathian newt, western toad, fire salamander and smooth snake. In mountain rivers populations of mink and otter can be found, along with fish species, such as trout. Many insects and molluscs are also present in the area.

== Population and economy ==
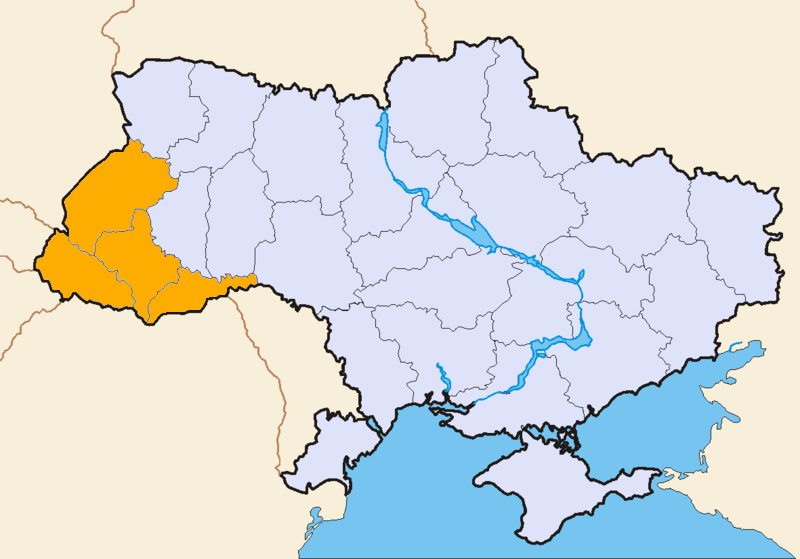
The Carpathian economic region (Ukrainian: Карпатський економічний район) in Ukraine, covering four administrative regions (oblasts)

Most of the territory of Ukrainian Carpathians is populated by Ukrainian highlander groups of Lemkos, Boykos, Hutsuls and Dolynians (in Transcarpathia). Except of Hutsuls, all of those groups have traditionally engaged in agriculture, with their settlements generally being located in mountain valleys. Among Hutsuls the main traditional occupation is Alpine transhumance, which contributes to a higher elevation of their settlements. Industry in the region is relatively underdeveloped, with the exception of oil production in the Boryslav-Skhidnytsia area. The presence of numerous mineral water sources has contributed to the development of tourism, allowing Ukrainian Carpathians to rival Crimea as a popular tourist destination. Starting from the late 19th century, the weak development of local economy has contributed to mass emigration from the area.

== See also ==
- Divisions of the Carpathians
- Wooded Carpathians
- Polonyna (montane meadow)
- East Carpathian Biosphere Reserve

== Sources ==
- Földvary, Gábor Z. (1988). Geology of the Carpathian Region. Singapore: World Scientific Publishing Company. ISBN 9789813103825.
- Tasenkevich, Lydia (2009). "Polonynas: Highlands Pastures in the Ukrainian Carpathians". Grasslands in Europe: Of High Nature Value. Zeist: KNNV Publishing. pp. 203–208. ISBN 9789004278103.

== Maps ==
Eastern Carpathians, bordered in red and marked with 4 and 5

Outer Eastern Carpathians, bordered in red and marked 4

Inner Eastern Carpathians, bordered in red and marked 5

Outer Subcarpathian regions, bordered in red and marked I.
