= Skole Raion =

Former subdivision of Lviv Oblast, Ukraine

Skole Raion Сколівський район
- Raion
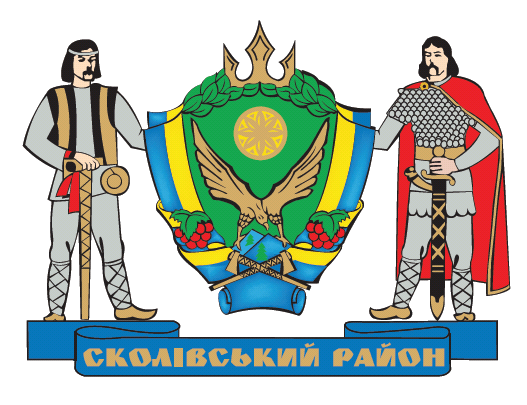
- Flag Coat of arms

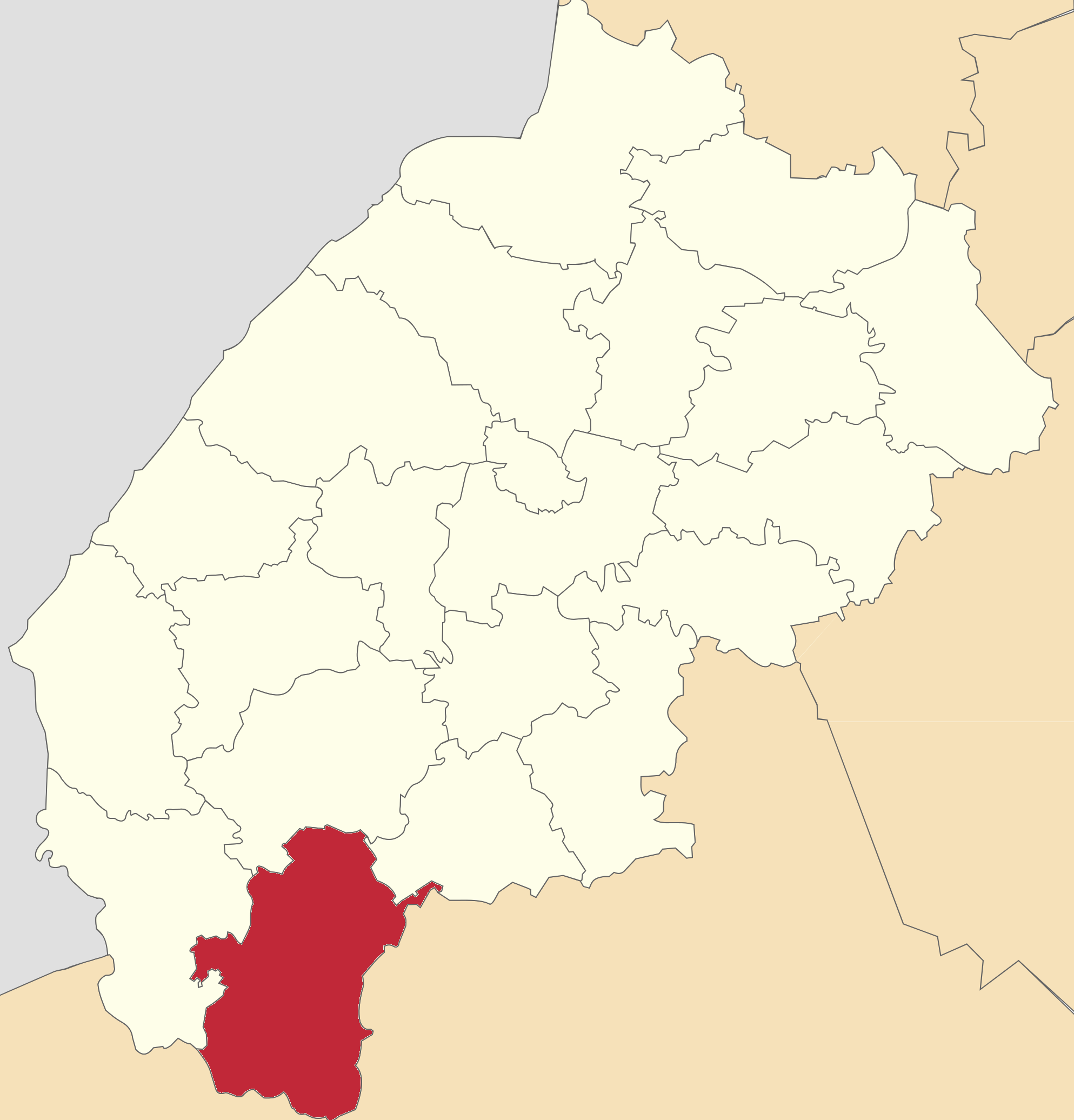
- Coordinates: 48°58′8″N 23°24′44″E
- Country: Ukraine
- Region: Lviv Oblast
- Established: 1940
- Disestablished: 18 July 2020
- Admin. center: Skole
- Subdivisions: List: — city councils; — settlement councils; — rural councils; Number of localities: — cities; — urban-type settlements; 53 — villages; — rural settlements

Area
  - Total: 1,471 km^{2} (568 sq mi)

Population (2020)
  - Total: 46,996
  - Density: 31.95/km^{2} (82.75/sq mi)
- Time zone: UTC+02:00 (EET)
  - Summer (DST): UTC+03:00 (EEST)
- Postal index: 82600—82666
- Area code: 380-3264

Skole Raion (Ukrainian: Сколівський район) was a raion (district) in Lviv Oblast in western Ukraine. Its administrative center was Skole. The raion was abolished on 18 July 2020 as part of the administrative reform of Ukraine, which reduced the number of raions of Lviv Oblast to seven. The area of Skole Raion was merged into Stryi Raion. The last estimate of the raion population was 46,996 (2020 est.).

It was established in 1940.

At the time of disestablishment, the raion consisted of three hromadas:

- Kozova rural hromada with the administration in the selo of Kozova;
- Skole urban hromada with the administration in Skole;
- Slavske settlement hromada with the administration in the urban-type settlement of Slavske.

== People from Skole Raion ==
- Petro Jacyk, born in Verkhnie Synovydne — a Ukrainian Canadian businessman and philanthropist.

== Gallery ==
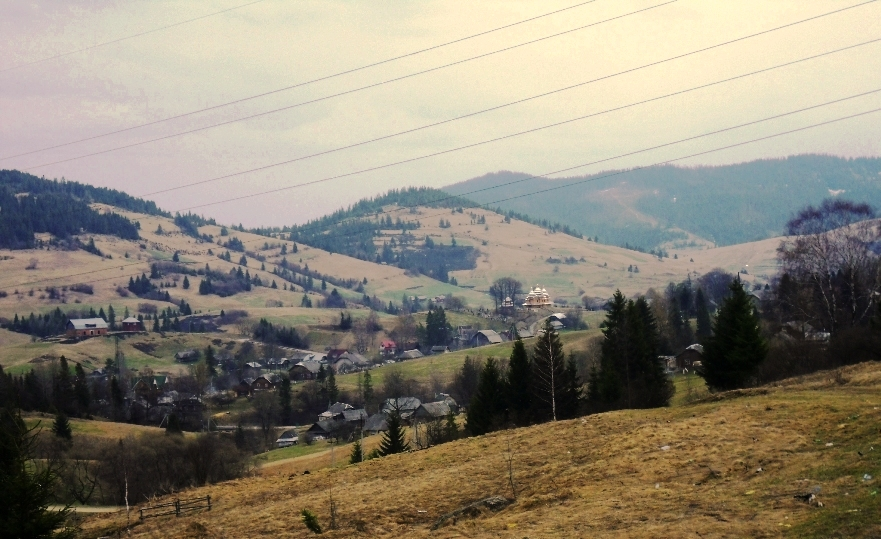
Villages in Lviv Oblast. Plavie, Skole Raion.

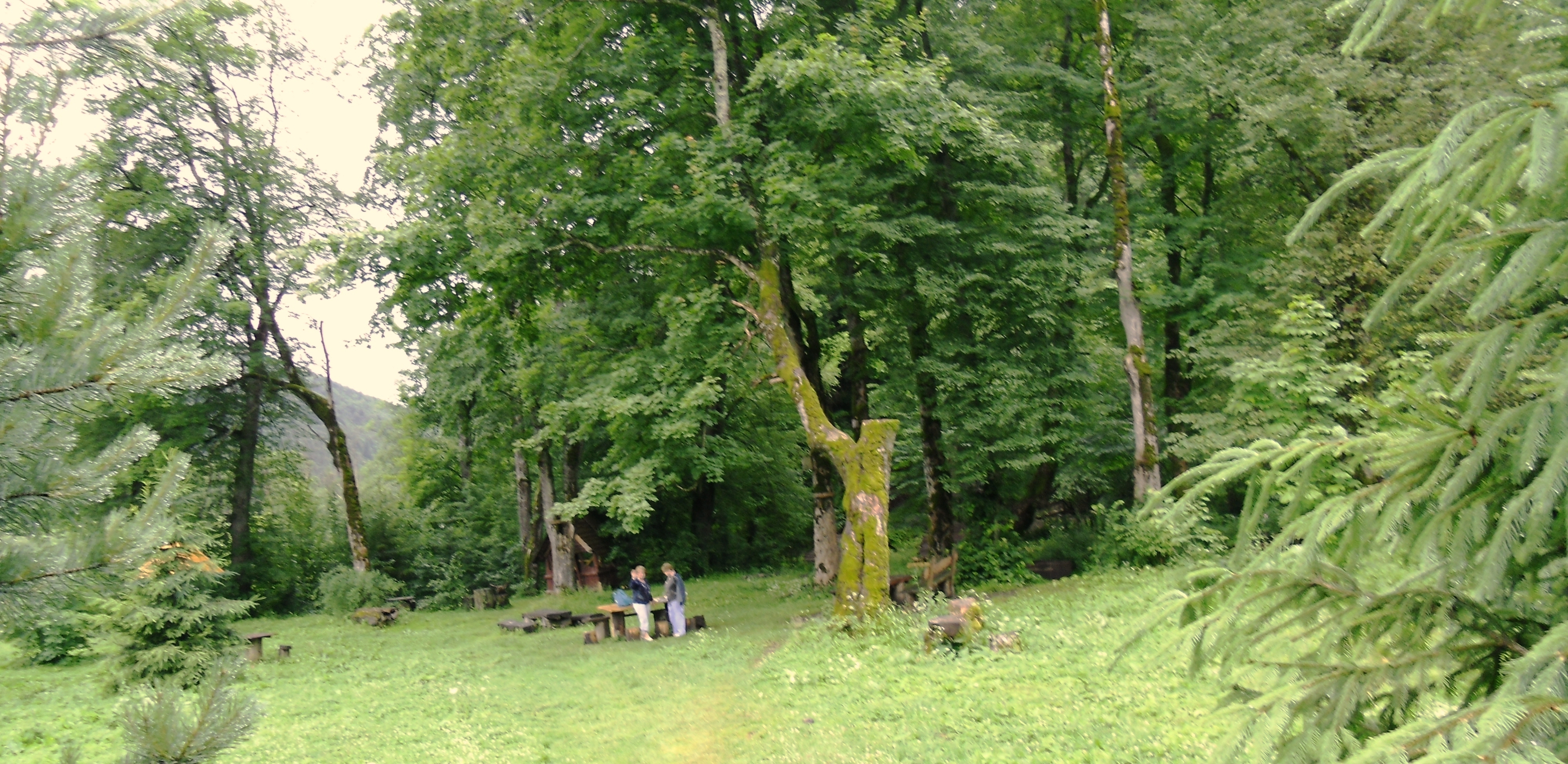
Ukraine. Skole Raion. Resting place next to the highway Lviv - Uzhhorod.

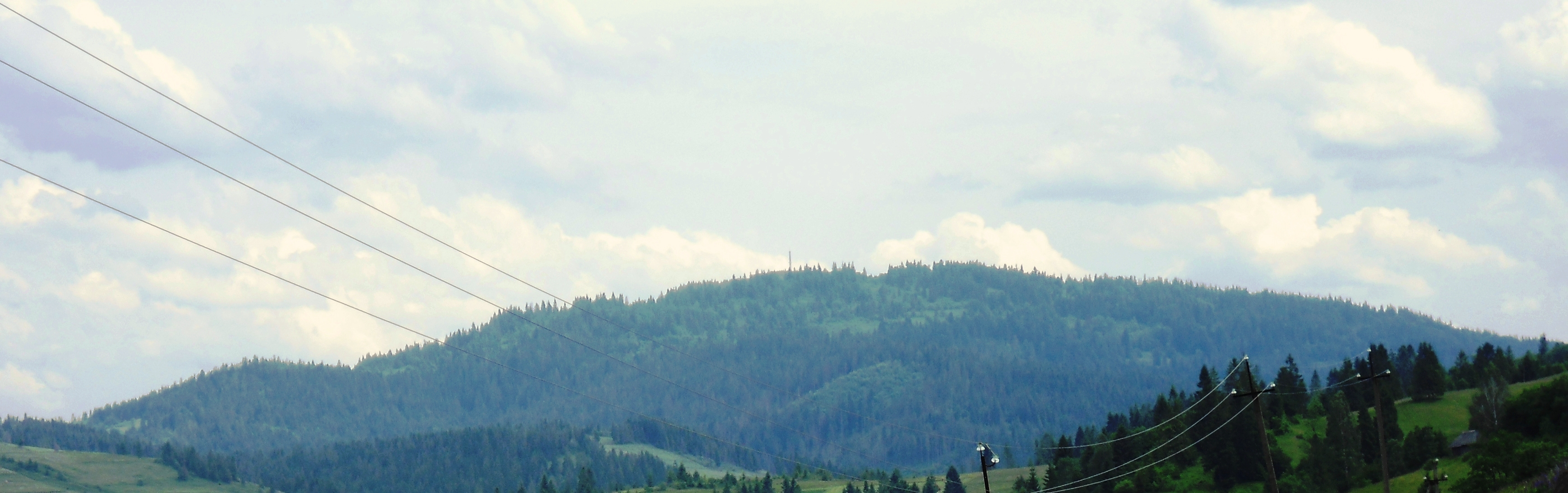
View of Mount Trostian (1235 m) in Slavske from the village Plavie.
