= Stryi Raion =

Subdivision of Lviv Oblast, Ukraine

Stryi Raion Стрийський район
- Raion
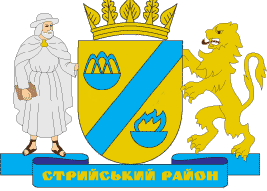
- Flag Coat of arms

- Coordinates: 49°13′37″N 23°51′59″E
- Country: Ukraine
- Oblast: Lviv Oblast
- Established: 1939
- Admin. center: Stryi
- Subdivisions: 14 hromadas

Area
  - Total: 3,854 km^{2} (1,488 sq mi)

Population (2022)
  - Total: 319,464
  - Density: 82.89/km^{2} (214.7/sq mi)
- Time zone: UTC+02:00 (EET)
  - Summer (DST): UTC+03:00 (EEST)
- Postal index: 82400—82489
- Area code: 380-3245

Stryi Raion (Ukrainian: Стрийський район) is a raion (district) in Lviv Oblast in western Ukraine. Its administrative center is the city of Stryi. Population: 319,464 (2022 estimate).

On 18 July 2020, as part of Ukraine's administrative reform, the number of raions in Lviv Oblast was reduced to seven, and the area of Stryi Raion was significantly expanded. Three abolished raions, Mykolaiv, Skole, and Zhydachiv Raions, as well as the cities of Morshyn, Novyi Rozdil, and Stryi, which were previously incorporated as cities of oblast significance, were merged into Stryi Raion. The January 2020 estimate of the raion population was 60,912 (2020 est.).

It was established in 1939 as part of Drohobych Oblast.

== Subdivisions ==
=== Current ===
After the reform in July 2020, the raion consisted of 14 hromadas:

- Hnizdychiv settlement hromada with the administration in the rural settlement of Hnizdychiv, transferred from Zhydachiv Raion;
- Hrabovets-Duliby rural hromada with the administration in the selo of Duliby, retained from Stryi Raion;
- Khodoriv urban hromada with the administration in the city of Khodoriv, transferred from Zhydachiv Raion;
- Koziova rural hromada with the administration in the selo of Koziova, transferred from Skole Raion;
- Morshyn urban hromada with the administration in the city of Morshyn, transferred from the city of oblast significance of Morshyn;
- Mykolaiv urban hromada with the administration in the city of Mykolaiv, transferred from Mykolaiv Raion;
- Novyi Rozdil urban hromada with the administration in the city of Novyi Rozdil, transferred from the city of oblast significance of Novyi Rozdil;
- Rozvadiv rural hromada with the administration in the selo of Rozvadiv, transferred from Mykolaiv Raion;
- Skole urban hromada with the administration in the city of Skole, transferred from Skole Raion;
- Slavske settlement hromada with the administration in the rural settlement of Slavske, transferred from Skole Raion;
- Stryi urban hromada with the administration in the city of Stryi, transferred from the city of oblast significance of Stryi;
- Trostianets rural hromada with the administration in the selo of Trostianets, transferred from Mykolaiv Raion;
- Zhuravne settlement hromada with the administration in the rural settlement of Zhuravne, transferred from Zhydachiv Raion;
- Zhydachiv urban hromada with the administration in the city of Zhydachiv, transferred from Zhydachiv Raion.

=== Before 2020 ===
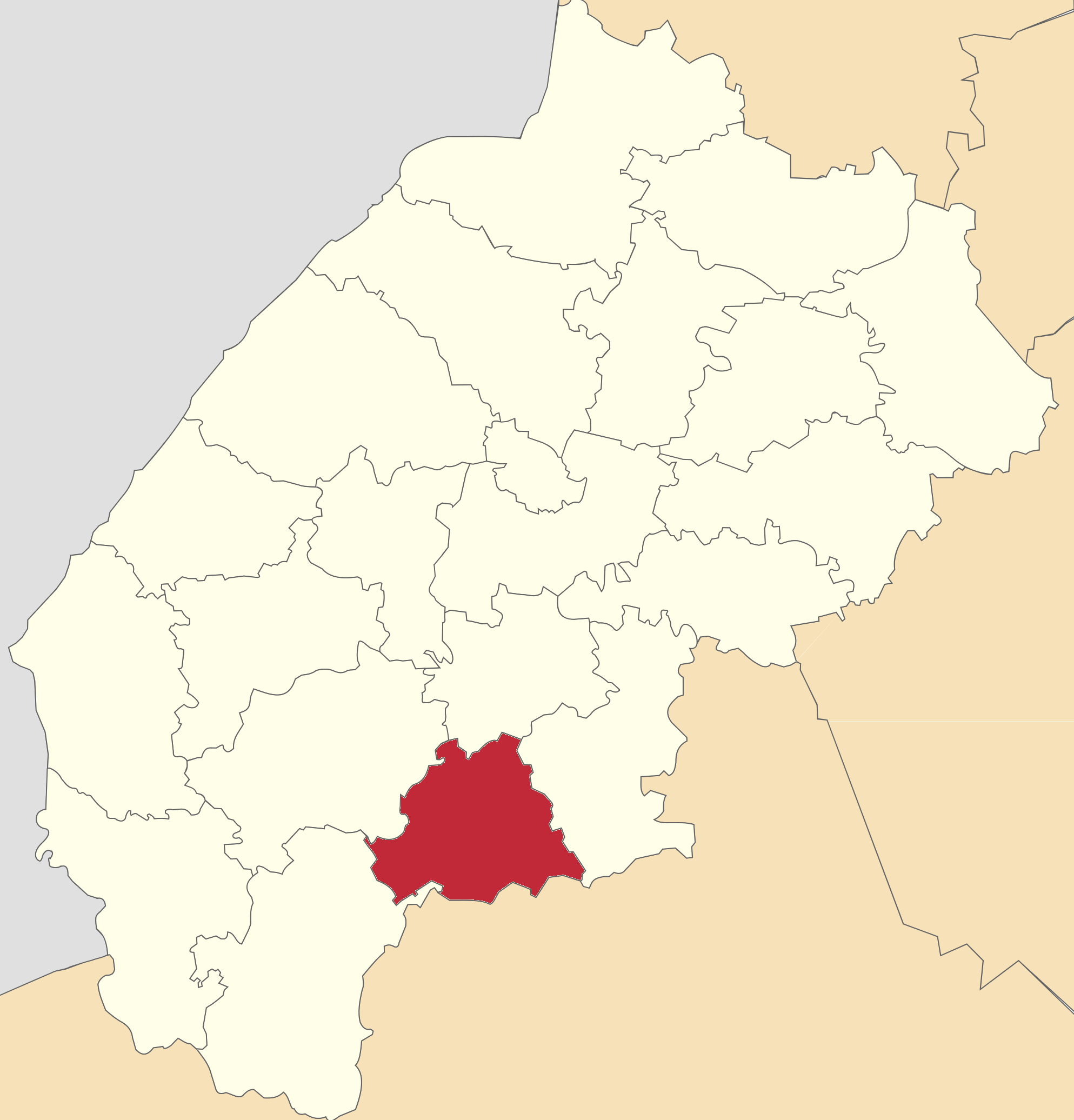
Stryi Raion in Lviv Oblast (1966-2020)

Before the 2020 reform, the raion consisted of one hromada, Hrabovets-Duliby rural hromada with the administration in Hrabovets.

== See also ==
- Administrative divisions of Lviv Oblast
