= Krushelnytsia =

Village in Lviv Oblast, Ukraine

Krushelnytsia Крушельниця
- Village
- Location within Lviv Oblast
- Coordinates: 49°06′16″N 23°29′10″E
- Country: Ukraine
- Oblast: Lviv Oblast
- District: Stryi Raion
- Established: 1395

Area
  - Total: 242 km^{2} (93 sq mi)
- Elevation /(average value of): 417 m (1,368 ft)

Population
  - Total: 1,297
  - Density: 53,595/km^{2} (138,810/sq mi)
- Time zone: UTC+2 (EET)
  - Summer (DST): UTC+3 (EEST)
- Postal code: 82617
- Area code: +380 3251
- Website: село Крушельниця ^{(Ukrainian)}

Krushelnytsia (Ukrainian: Крушельни́ця, Polish: Kruszelnica) is a village (selo) in Stryi Raion, Lviv Oblast, of Western Ukraine. It belongs to Skole urban hromada, one of the hromadas of Ukraine. The village covers an area of 2,42 km² and has a population of about 1297 people. Local government is administered by the Krushelnytsya village council.

== Geography ==
Krushelnytsia is located in the Stryi district, on the banks of two mountain rivers – the Stryi River and the Krushelnytsia River.
The village is located along the way Verkhnie Synovydne – Skhidnytsia at a distance 108 kilometres (67 mi) from the regional center of Lviv, 14 kilometres (8.7 mi) from the city of Skole, and 9 kilometres (5.6 mi) from Verkhnie Synovydne.

== History ==
The first written mention of the village dates back to 1395. On October 4, 1395, Władysław II Jagiełło, King of Poland, granted the village Krushelnytsia in Tustan parish to John and Demyan.

Until 18 July 2020, Krushelnytsia belonged to Skole Raion. The raion was abolished in July 2020 as part of Ukraine's administrative reform, which reduced the number of raions in Lviv Oblast to seven. The area of Skole Raion was merged into Stryi Raion.

== Places of worship ==
The village has an architectural monument of the Cultural Heritage of Stryi Raion in Ukraine:

- Church of the Holy Trinity (wooden), built in 1842 (N - 1414/1).
- Belfry Church of the Holy Trinity (wooden) (N - 1414/2).

There are in the village wooden church of St. Nicholas, built in 1822.
