= Korchyn, Stryi Raion, Lviv Oblast =

Village in Lviv Oblast, Ukraine

Korchyn Корчин
- Town
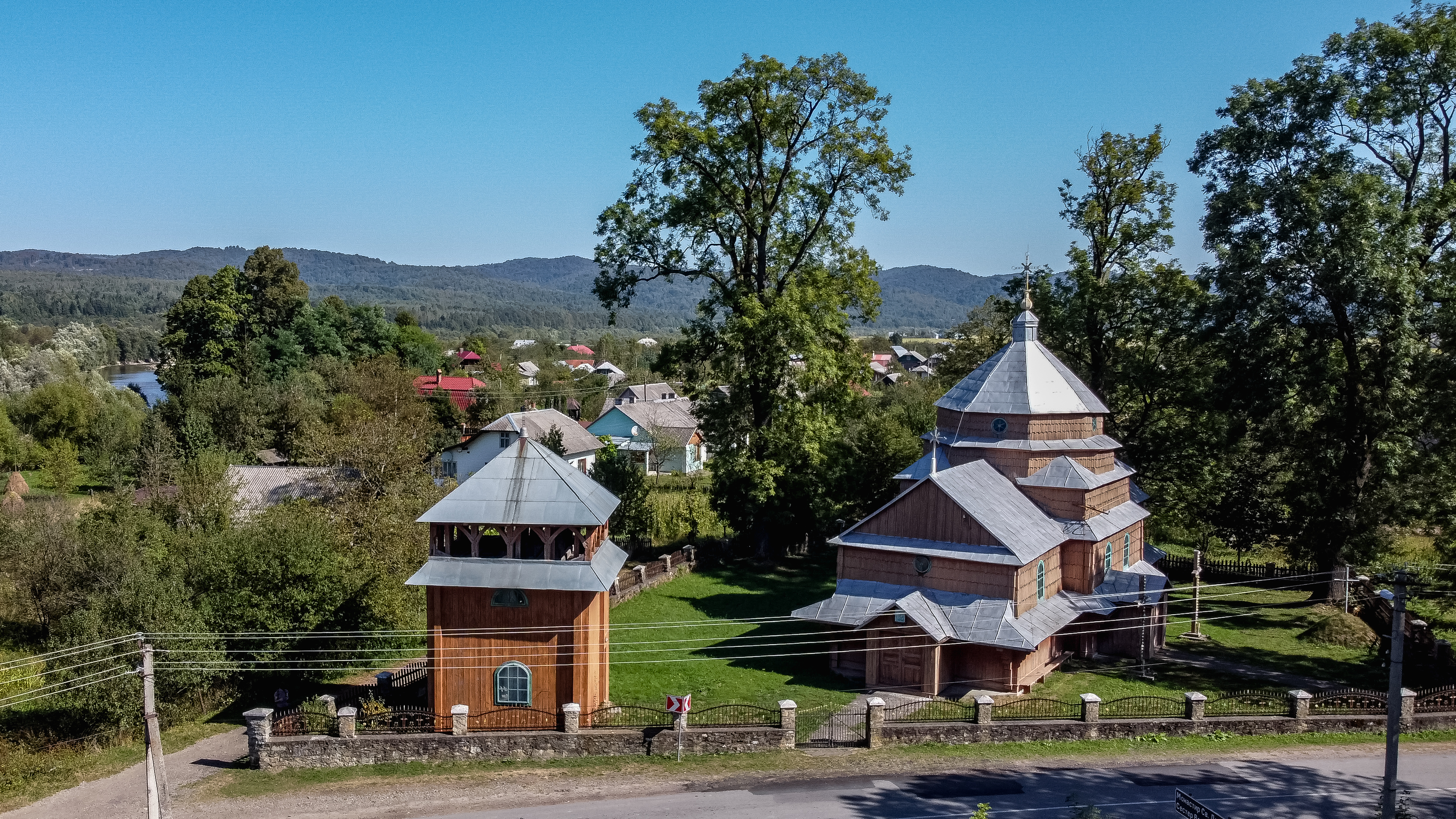
- View on the village with the wooden church

- Location within Lviv Oblast
- Coordinates: 49°05′48″N 23°31′41″E
- Country: Ukraine
- Oblast: Lviv Oblast
- District: Stryi Raion
- Established: 1446

Area
  - Total: 196 km^{2} (76 sq mi)
- Elevation /(average value of): 399 m (1,309 ft)

Population
  - Total: ▼1,069
  - Density: 65,357/km^{2} (169,270/sq mi)
- Time zone: UTC+2 (EET)
  - Summer (DST): UTC+3 (EEST)
- Postal code: 82616
- Area code: +380 3251
- Website: село Корчин ^{(Ukrainian)}

Korchyn (Ukrainian: Ко́рчин, Polish: Korczyn) is a village (selo) in Stryi Raion, Lviv Oblast, in Western Ukraine. The village is located along the Stryi River, on the road between the urban-type settlements of Verkhnie Synovydne and Skhidnytsia. Korchyn belongs to the Skole urban hromada, one of the hromadas of Ukraine. It is 104 kilometres (65 mi) from the city of Lviv, 25 kilometres (16 mi) from Skole, and 23 kilometres (14 mi) from Skhidnytsia.
Local government is administered by the Korchynska village council.

== History ==
The first record of the village dates back to 1446. According to history, Korchyn divided into two parts: Eastern part with the ancient name Korchyn Rustykalnyy and Western part , Korchyn Shlyahetskyy.

Until 18 July 2020, Korchyn belonged to Skole Raion. The raion was abolished in July 2020 as part of the administrative reform of Ukraine, which reduced the number of raions of Lviv Oblast to seven. The area of Skole Raion was merged into Stryi Raion.

== Attractions ==
The village includes two architectural sights:

- St. Cosmas and Damian's Church (wood), 1824 (504/1-М).
- The bell tower of the church of St. Cosmas and Demyan, 1824 (504/2-М).

== Notable residents ==
- Ivan Khandon (1911–1989), Ukrainian painter, public figure, and participant in the Ukrainian liberation movement

== Gallery ==
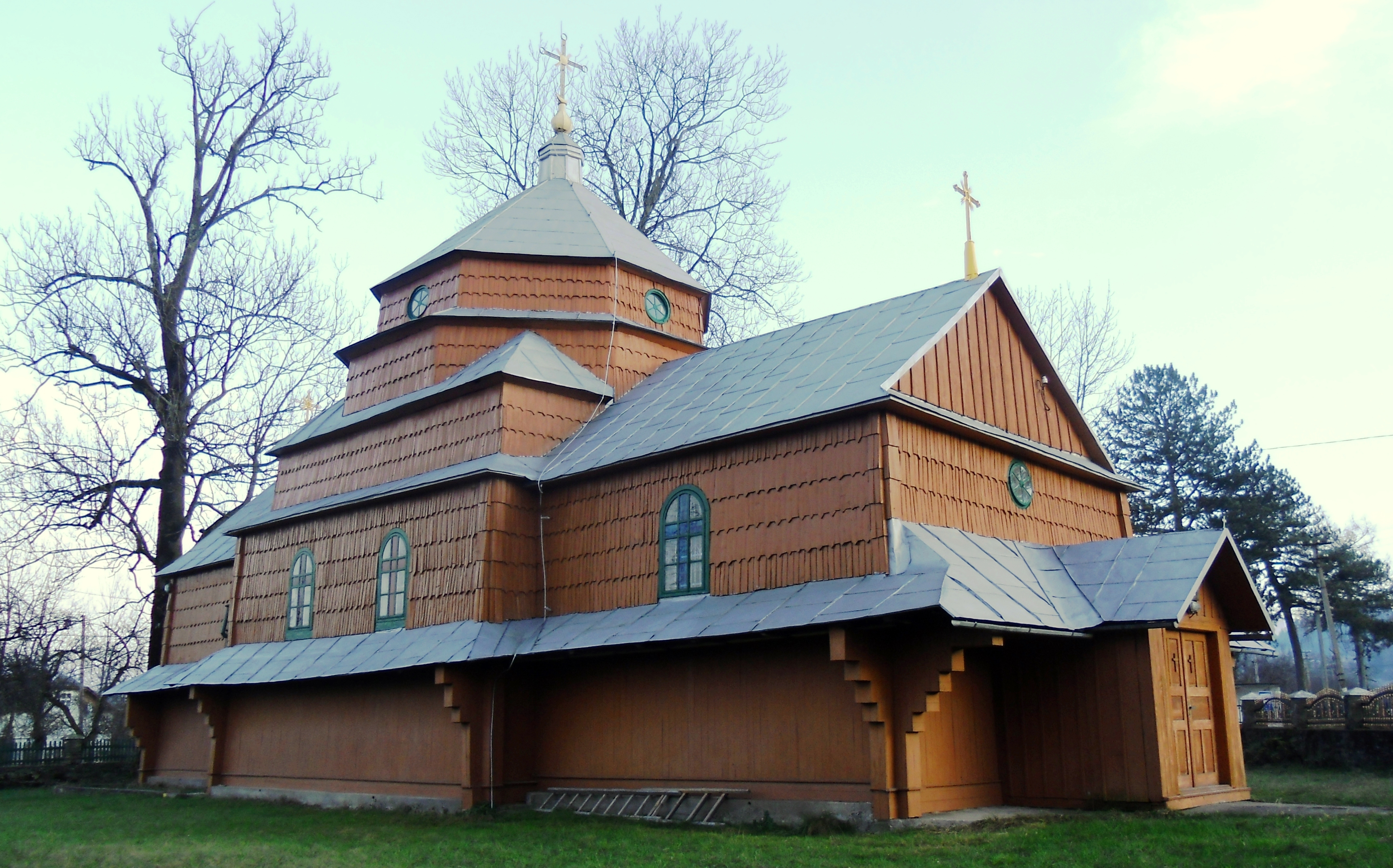
Wooden Church of St. Cosmas and Damian's in the village Korchyn

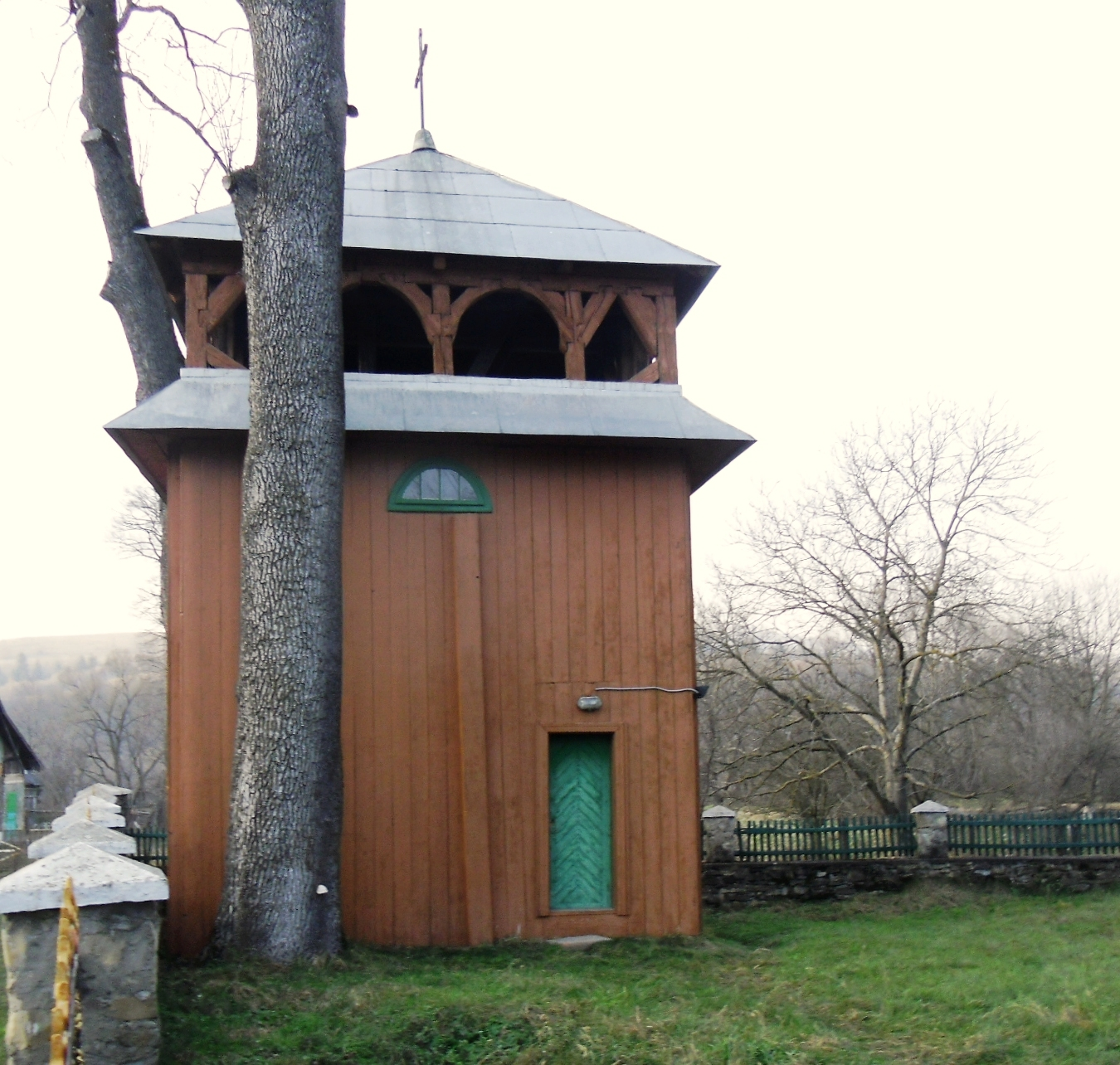
The bell tower of the church of St. Cosmas and Demyan in the village Korchyn

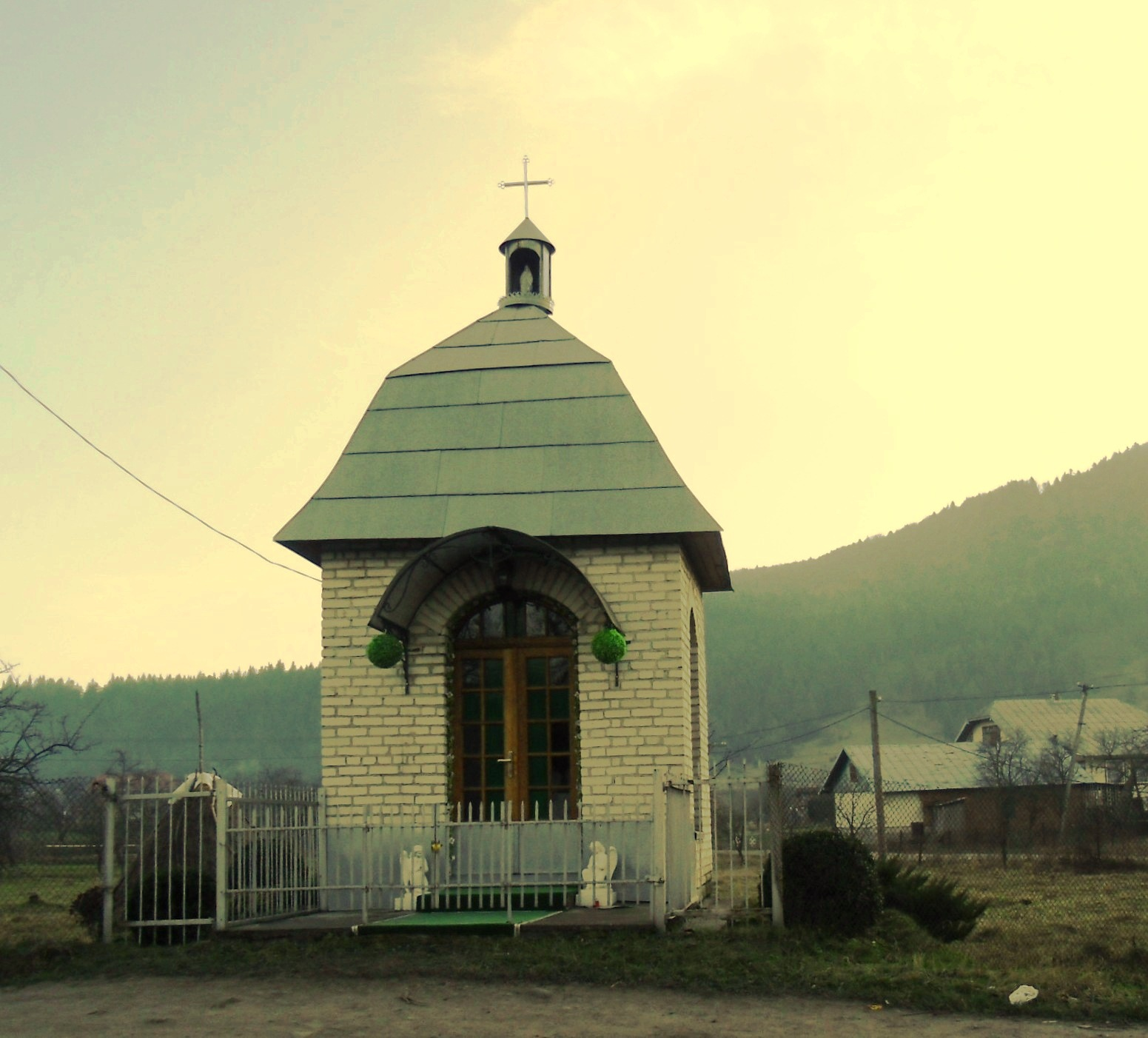
Chapel of the Nativity of the Theotokos in the village Korchyn

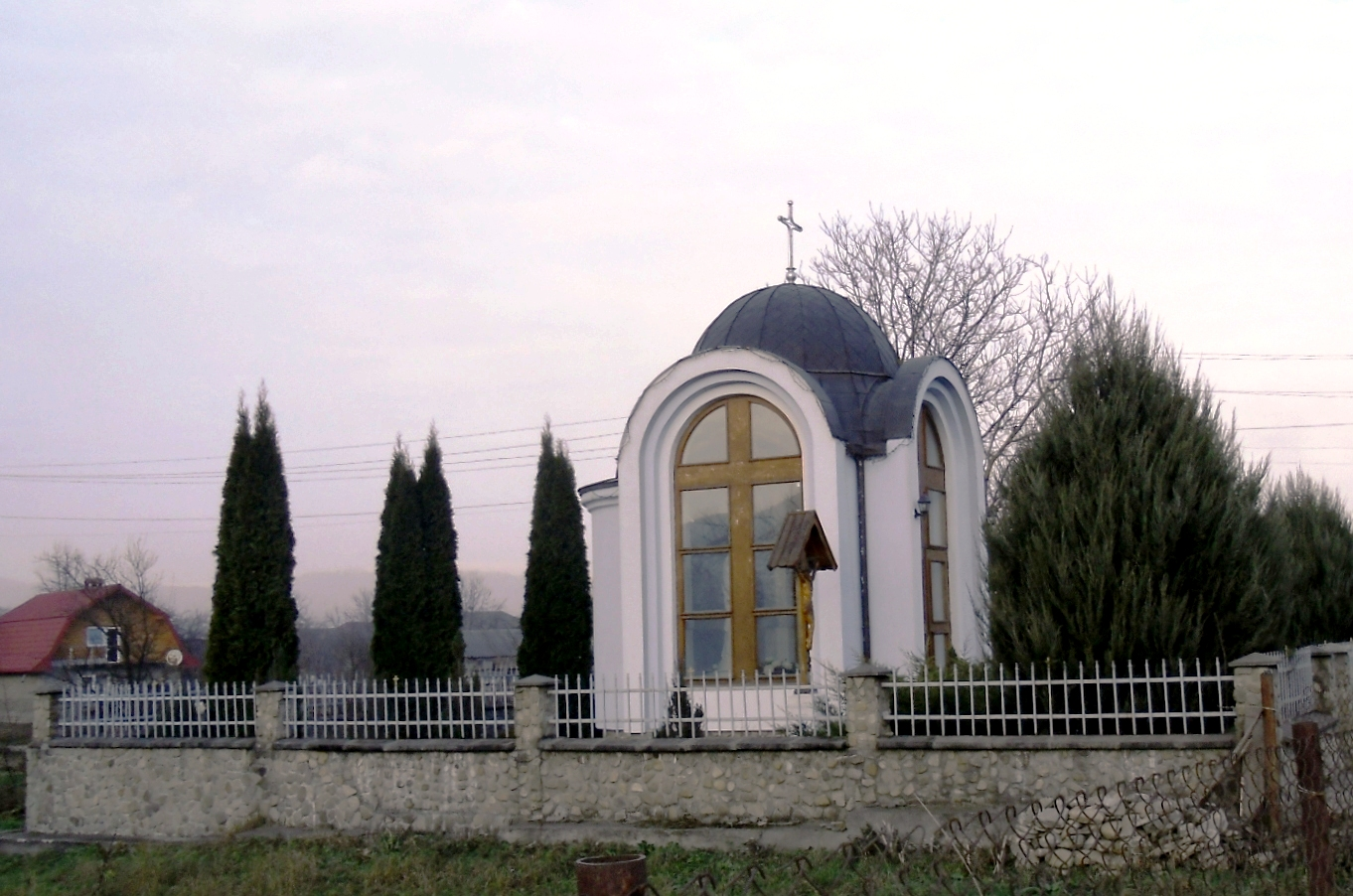
Chapel of the Assumption of the Blessed Virgin Mary in the village Korchyn

== Literature ==
- Ukrainian: Історія міст і сіл УРСР : Львівська область. – К. : ГРУРЕ, 1968 р. Page 717.
