= Mezhybrody =

Village in Lviv Oblast, Ukraine

Mezhybrody Межиброди Międzybrody
- Village
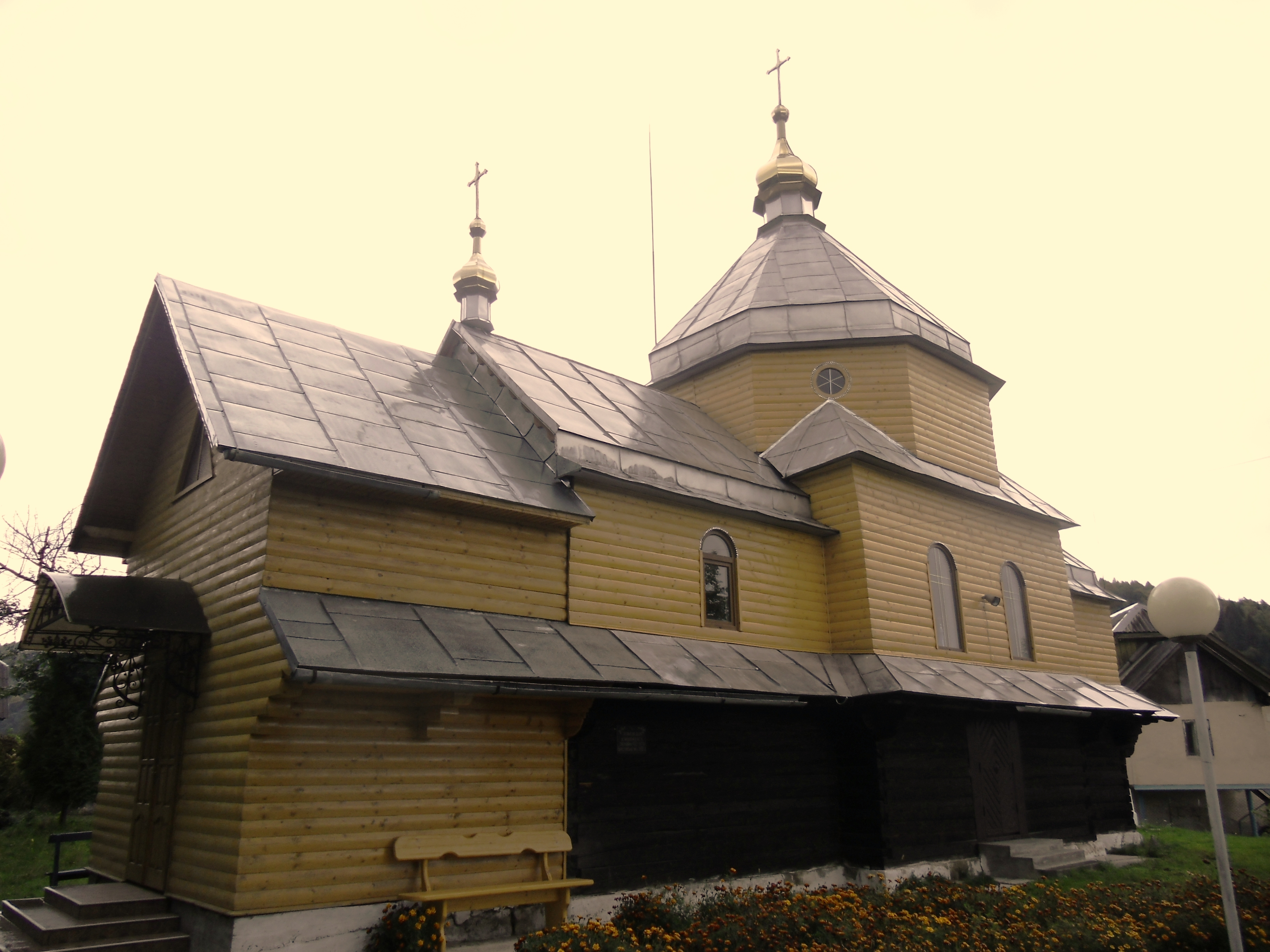

- Location within Lviv Oblast Location within Ukraine
- Coordinates: 49°06′25″N 23°36′05″E
- Country: Ukraine
- Oblast: Lviv
- Raion: Stryi Raion
- Established: 1564

Area
  - Total: 0.74 km^{2} (0.29 sq mi)
- Elevation /(average value of): 448 m (1,470 ft)

Population
  - Total: 214
  - Density: 290/km^{2} (750/sq mi)
- Time zone: UTC+2 (EET)
  - Summer (DST): UTC+3 (EEST)
- Postal code: 82613
- Area code: +380 3251
- Website: село Межиброди ^{(Ukrainian)}

Mezhybrody (Ukrainian: Межиброди, Polish: Międzybrody) is a village (selo) in Stryi Raion, Lviv Oblast, of Western Ukraine. Mezhybrody village is located in a picturesque corner of the Carpathians of Skole district, at the foot of where the two mountain rivers — Stryi River and Opir River. Village is located close to Highway M06 (Ukraine) ( M 06). It belongs to Skole urban hromada, one of the hromadas of Ukraine. Local government — Verkhnosynovydnenska settlement council. Population of the village amounts to only 214 people.

Distance from the regional center Lviv is 98 kilometres (61 mi), 26 kilometres (16 mi) from the city of Skole, and 170 kilometres (110 mi) from Uzhhorod.

The village was first mentioned in 1564.

Until 18 July 2020, Mezhybrody belonged to Skole Raion. The raion was abolished in July 2020 as part of the administrative reform of Ukraine, which reduced the number of raions of Lviv Oblast to seven. The area of Skole Raion was merged into Stryi Raion.
