= Nyzhnie Synovydne =

Village in Lviv Oblast, Ukraine

Nyzhnie Synovydne Нижнє Синьовидне
- Village
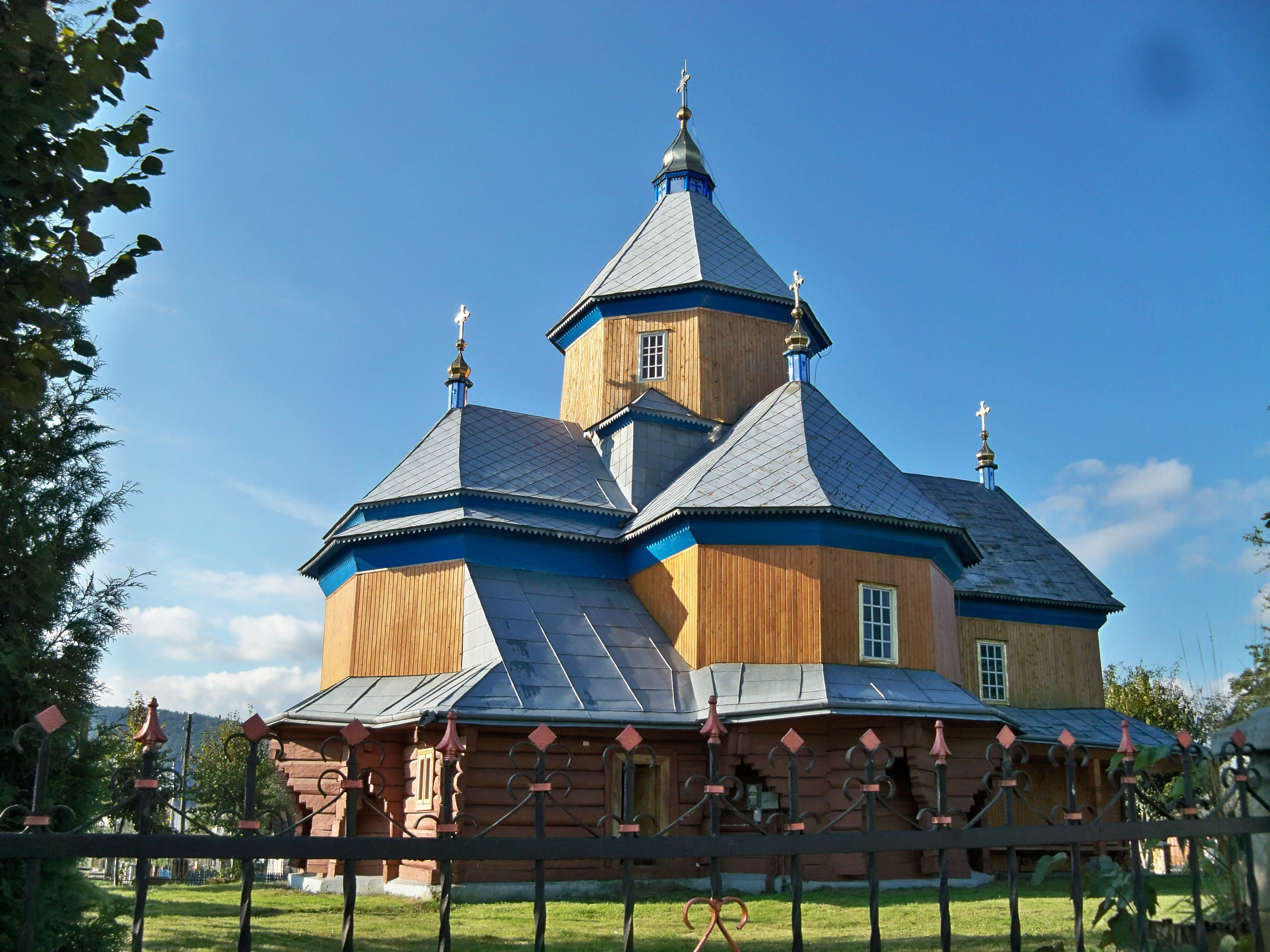
- Church of the Dormition

- Location within Lviv Oblast
- Coordinates: 49°06′32″N 23°38′24″E
- Country: Ukraine
- Oblast: Lviv Oblast
- District: Stryi Raion
- Established: 1691

Area
  - Total: 163 km^{2} (63 sq mi)
- Elevation /(average value of): 375 m (1,230 ft)

Population
  - Total: 1,113
  - Density: 68,282/km^{2} (176,850/sq mi)
- Time zone: UTC+2 (EET)
  - Summer (DST): UTC+3 (EEST)
- Postal code: 82615
- Area code: +380 3251
- Website: село Нижнє Синьовидне ^{(Ukrainian)}

Nyzhnie Synovydne (Ukrainian: Ни́жнє Синьови́дне, Polish: Synowódzko Niżne) is a village (selo) in Stryi Raion, Lviv Oblast, of Western Ukraine. It belongs to the Skole urban hromada, one of the hromadas of Ukraine. The population of the village is about 1,113 people and Local government is administered by the Nyzhnosynovydnenska village council.

== Geography ==
The village is located in the river valley where the two rivers merge into one — Stryi River and Opir River.
Area of the village totals is 1,63 km^{2} and is located along the Highway M06 (Ukraine) ( M 06). It is situated 95 kilometres (59 mi) from the regional center Lviv, 17 kilometres (11 mi) from the district center Skole, and 173 kilometres (107 mi) from Uzhhorod.

== History ==
The village has been known since the 13th century, although its official founding date is 1691.
In ancient times, a trade route from Kievan Rus' to Hungary passed through the village.

Until 18 July 2020, Nyzhnie Synovydne belonged to Skole Raion. The raion was abolished in July 2020 as part of Ukraine's administrative reform, which reduced the number of raions in Lviv Oblast to seven. The area of Skole Raion was merged into Stryi Raion.

== Attractions ==
The village has two sights of architecture Skole district:

- Assumption of the Virgin Mary church (wood, 1803) (1416 / 1)
- Assumption of the Virgin Mary church bell tower 18th century (wood). (1416 / 2)

== Gallery ==
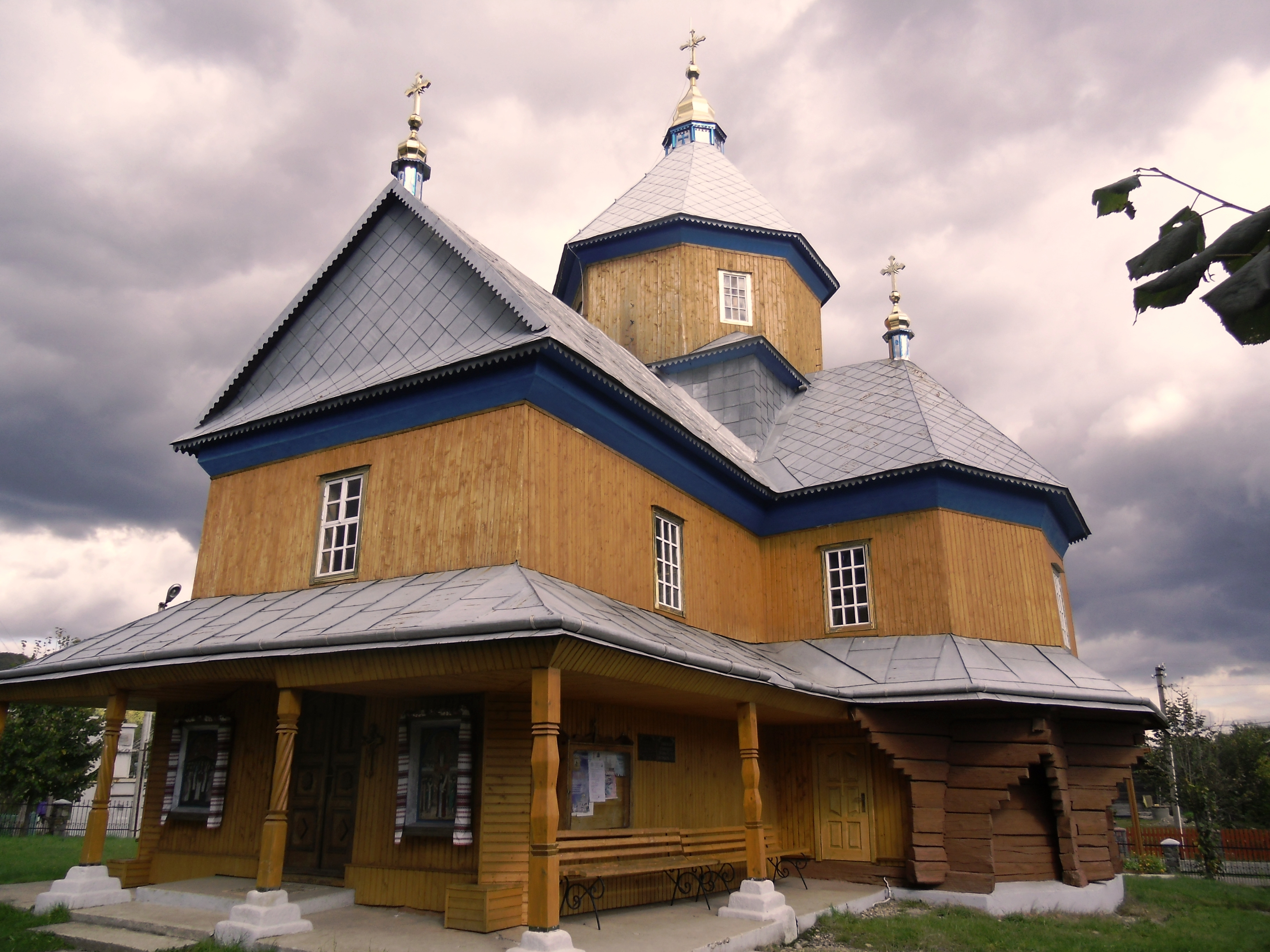
Assumption of the Virgin Mary church

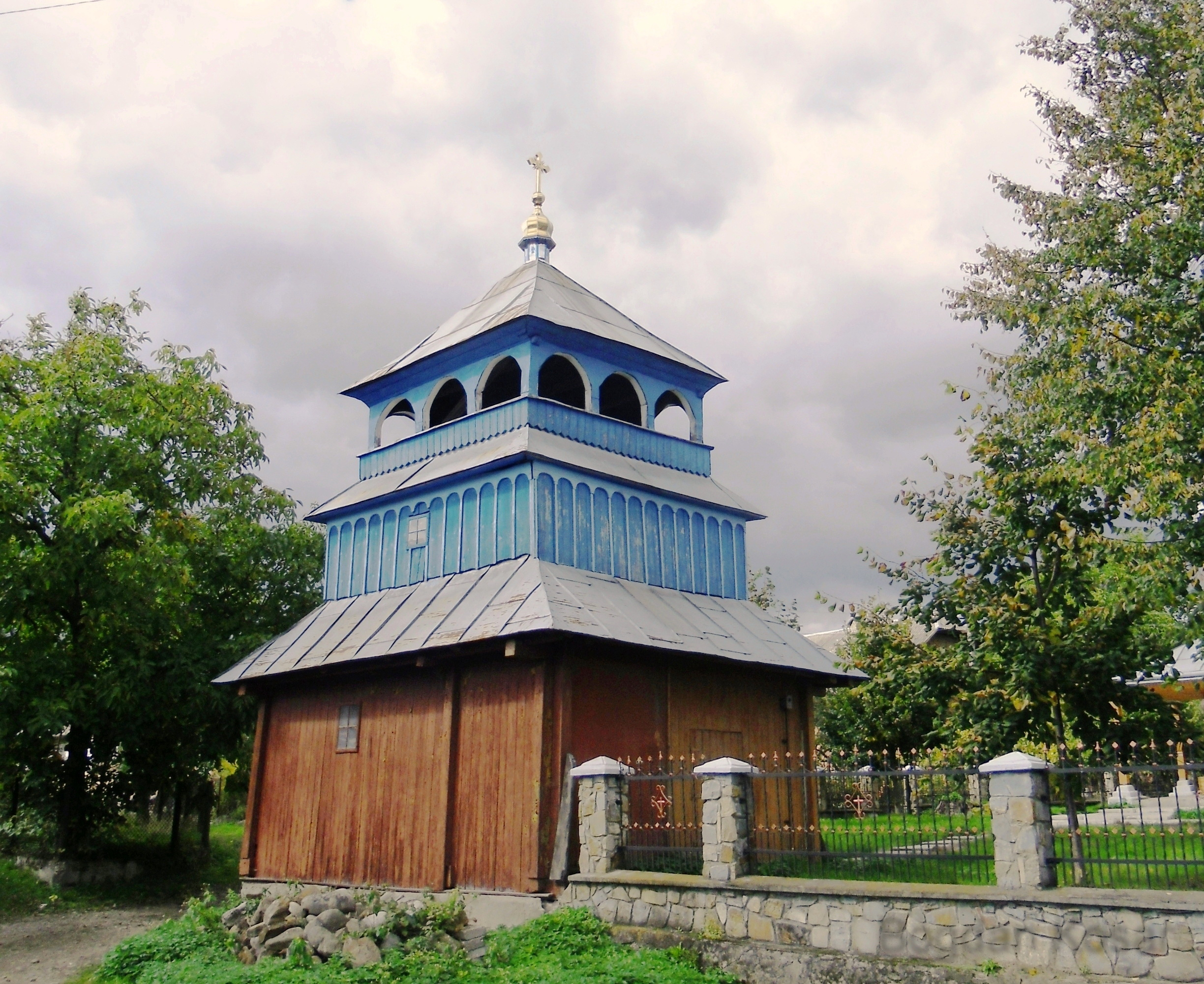
Assumption of the Virgin Mary church bell tower

== Literature ==
- Ukrainian: Історія міст і сіл УРСР : Львівська область. – К. : ГРУРЕ, 1968 р. Page 717
