= Ivan Khandon =

Ukrainian painter (1911–1989)

- Іван Михайлович Хандон
- Born: 10 June 1911; Korchyn, now Stryi Raion, Lviv Oblast, Ukraine
- Died: 22 June 1989 (aged 78); Korchyn, Stryi Raion, Lviv Oblast, Ukraine
- Education: Remote Public University of Arts
- Occupations: Painter, public figure

Ivan Khandon (Ukrainian: Іван Михайлович Хандон; 10 June 1911 – 22 June 1989) was a Ukrainian painter, public figure, and participant in the Ukrainian liberation movement. He was a member of the OUN.

== Biography ==
Ivan Khandon was born on 10 June 1911, in Korchyn (now Skole Hromada, Stryi Raion, Lviv Oblast, Ukraine).

He had a secondary education. He was active in Ukrainian sports and educational organizations, including "Plast", "Sokil", "Ridna Shkola", and "Prosvita".

In the 1930s, he joined the Organization of Ukrainian Nationalists. While serving in the sapper troops of the Polish army, he gained the necessary experience that helped him become the OUN's combat referent in Korchyn. Later, he became a member of the OUN's county leadership. He was arrested multiple times by the Polish police. In 1933 and 1936, he served two prison sentences in Lviv and Stryi.

On 27 July 1940, he was arrested by the Skole district department of the NKVD (under articles 54-2 and 54-11 of the Criminal Code of the Ukrainian SSR). On November 4, 1940, the Lviv regional court sentenced him to 10 years in corrective labor camps and an additional 5 years of restricted rights. Khandon served his sentence in the Vorkuta Corrective Labor Camp, where he worked in a coal mine. In 1948, he was transferred to Vorkuta Special Camp No. 6—Rechlag. On 21 July 1950, he was released but sent to a special settlement in the city of Krasnoyarsk. He was released on 12 April 1956. In 1959, he returned home.

In 1974, he graduated from the Faculty of Fine Arts of the Remote Public University of Arts.

He died on June 22, 1989, in his native village, where he is buried. He was rehabilitated in 1993.

== Creativity ==
While imprisoned at the Rechlag camp (Vorkuta), Khandon continued to actively paint, constantly improving his talent. His first known work is dated 1947, which indicates the artist's uninterrupted creative path. The German artist Julius Stürmer (1915–2011), who was also serving time in the camp starting in 1948, had a positive influence on the development of Khandon's academic artistic style. Their interaction contributed to a valuable professional exchange and the intensive development of Khandon's artistic skills. A number of Khandon's landscapes, still lifes, narrative compositions, and portraits, painted in oil, watercolor, and "dry brush" techniques, as well as his design and mosaic works, have been preserved.

Posthumously, thanks to the efforts of his family, Khandon's works were presented at group and solo exhibitions in Lviv (1989, 1991, 1993, 2006, 2011, 2016), Stryi (1994, 2012), Warsaw (Poland), Korchyn (1999), and Morshyn (2011).

Some of his works are held in the collections of the Lviv Historical Museum.

== Memory ==
In 2011, a commemorative event dedicated to the 100th anniversary of the artist Ivan Khandon's birth was held at the Lviv Polytechnic National University.

In 2012, within the framework of the World Festival of Ukrainian Credit Unions, a plein air art event dedicated to the memory of Ivan Khandon was organized and held in his native village.

A memorial plaque in honor of Ivan Khandon has been installed in his native village.

== Bibliography ==
- Хандон Іван Михайлович // Реабілітовані історією. У двадцяти семи томах. Львівська область. Книга одинадцята: Сколівський район, Сокальський район. — Львів: Простір-М, 2022. — С. 368. — ISBN 978-966-8657-11-5.
- Кирчів Р. Людина. Громадянин. Патріот. Націоналіст // Дзвін. — 2011. — № 7. — С. 108—110.
