= Kamianka, Lviv Oblast =

Village in Lviv Oblast, Ukraine

Kamianka Ка́м'янка
- Village
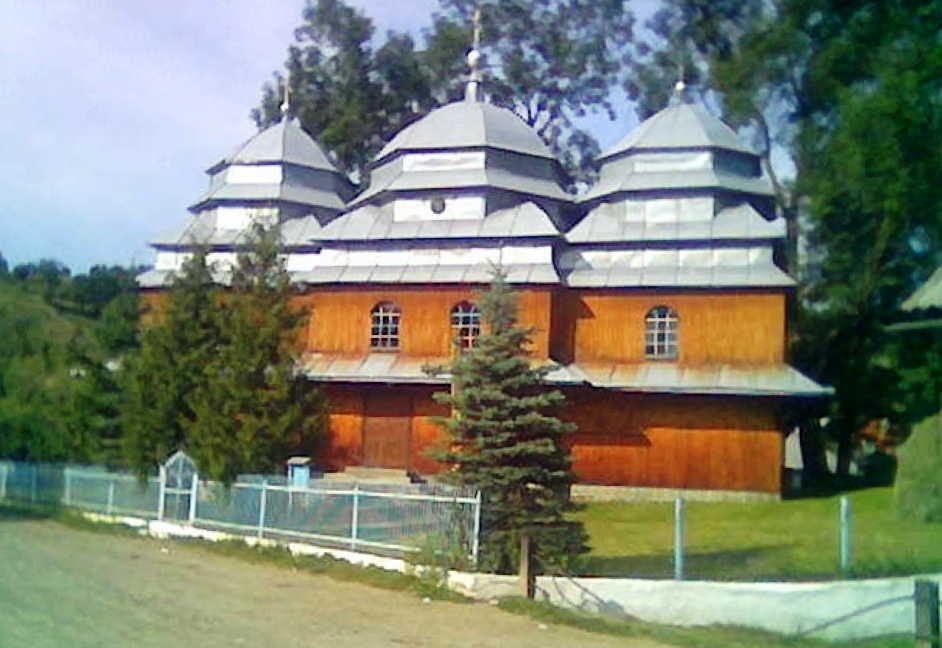

- Location within Lviv Oblast
- Coordinates: 49°00′48″N 23°34′41″E
- Country: Ukraine
- Oblast: Lviv Oblast
- District: Stryi Raion
- Established: 1774

Area
  - Total: 0,650 km^{2} (250 sq mi)
- Elevation /(average value of): 601 m (1,972 ft)

Population
  - Total: 447
- Time zone: UTC+2 (EET)
  - Summer (DST): UTC+3 (EEST)
- Postal code: 82600
- Area code: +380 3251
- Website: село Кам'янка ^{(Ukrainian)}

Kamianka (Ukrainian: Ка́м'янка; until 1952 Ukrainian: Ри́сяча я́ма, Rysya Yama, lit. Lynx Pit; Polish: Kamionka) is a village (selo) in Stryi Raion, Lviv Oblast, of Western Ukraine. It belongs to the Skole urban hromada, one of the hromadas of Ukraine. Local government is administered by the Kamiantska village council.

The village is in the southern part of Lviv Oblast in the Ukrainian Carpathians, within the limits of the Eastern Beskids (Skole Beskids). The village is 112 kilometres (70 mi) from the regional center of Lviv, 26 kilometres (16 mi) from the city of Skole, and 170 kilometres (110 mi) from Uzhhorod. Downstream along the Kamianka are the Kamyanetskiy Falls, a hydrological natural monument of Ukraine.

The first written mention of Kamianka dates back to 1774.

Until 18 July 2020, Kamianka belonged to Skole Raion. The raion was abolished in July 2020 as part of Ukraine's administrative reform, which reduced the number of raions in Lviv Oblast to seven. The area of Skole Raion was merged into Stryi Raion.
