= Dubyna, Stryi Raion, Lviv Oblast =

Village in Lviv Oblast, Ukraine

Dubyna Ду́бина
- Village
- Location within Lviv Oblast
- Coordinates: 49°03′39″N 23°32′47″E
- Country: Ukraine
- Oblast: Lviv Oblast
- District: Stryi Raion
- Established: 1561

Area
  - Total: 061 km^{2} (24 sq mi)
- Elevation /(average value of): 428 m (1,404 ft)

Population
  - Total: 276
- Time zone: UTC+2 (EET)
  - Summer (DST): UTC+3 (EEST)
- Postal code: 82614
- Area code: +380 3251
- Website: селище Верхнє Синьовидне ^{(Ukrainian)}

Dubyna (Ukrainian: Ду́бина, Polish: Dębina) is a village (selo) in Stryi Raion, Lviv Oblast, of Western Ukraine. It belongs to Skole urban hromada, one of the hromadas of Ukraine.

The village is located on the banks of the Opir River along the Highway M06 (Ukraine) ( M 06).

It is situated 105 kilometres (65 mi) from the regional center Lviv, 4 kilometres (2.5 mi) from the district center Skole, and 163 kilometres (101 mi) from Uzhhorod.

Local government — Verkhnosynovydnenska settlement council.

The first written mention of the village dates from the year 1561 and the name of the village is derived from the surrounding oak forests (dubovyy lis).

Until 18 July 2020, Dubyna belonged to Skole Raion. The raion was abolished in July 2020 as part of the administrative reform of Ukraine, which reduced the number of raions of Lviv Oblast to seven. The area of Skole Raion was merged into Stryi Raion.

== Famous people who have visited the village ==
- Solomiya Krushelnytska (1872 – 1952) – Ukrainian opera singer, was one of the brightest soprano opera stars of the first half of the 20th century.
- Myroslav Skoryk (1938) – Ukrainian composer and teacher, People's Artist of Ukraine, winner of the Prize Shevchenko.

== Gallery ==
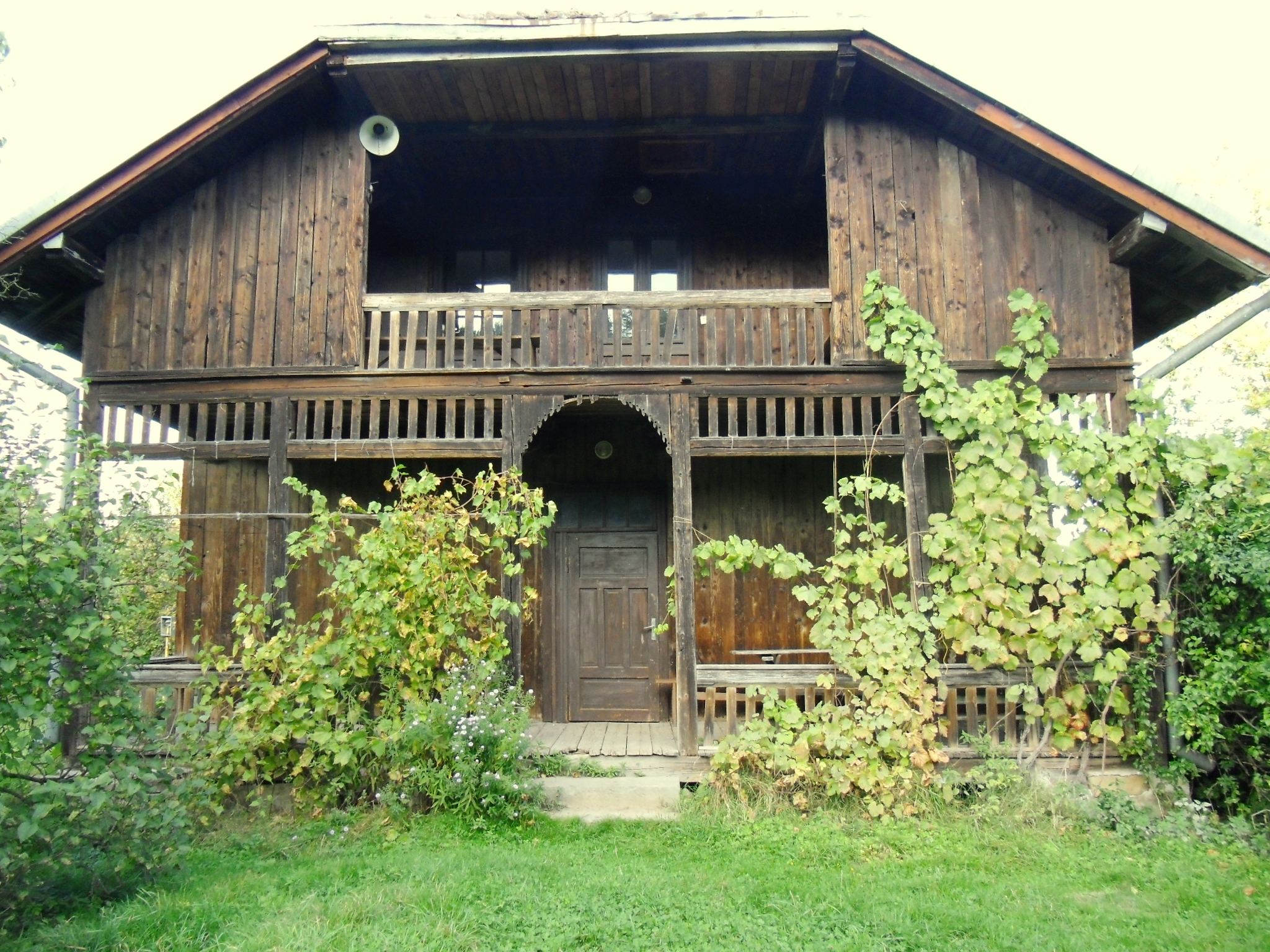
Wooden house in the village Dubyna.

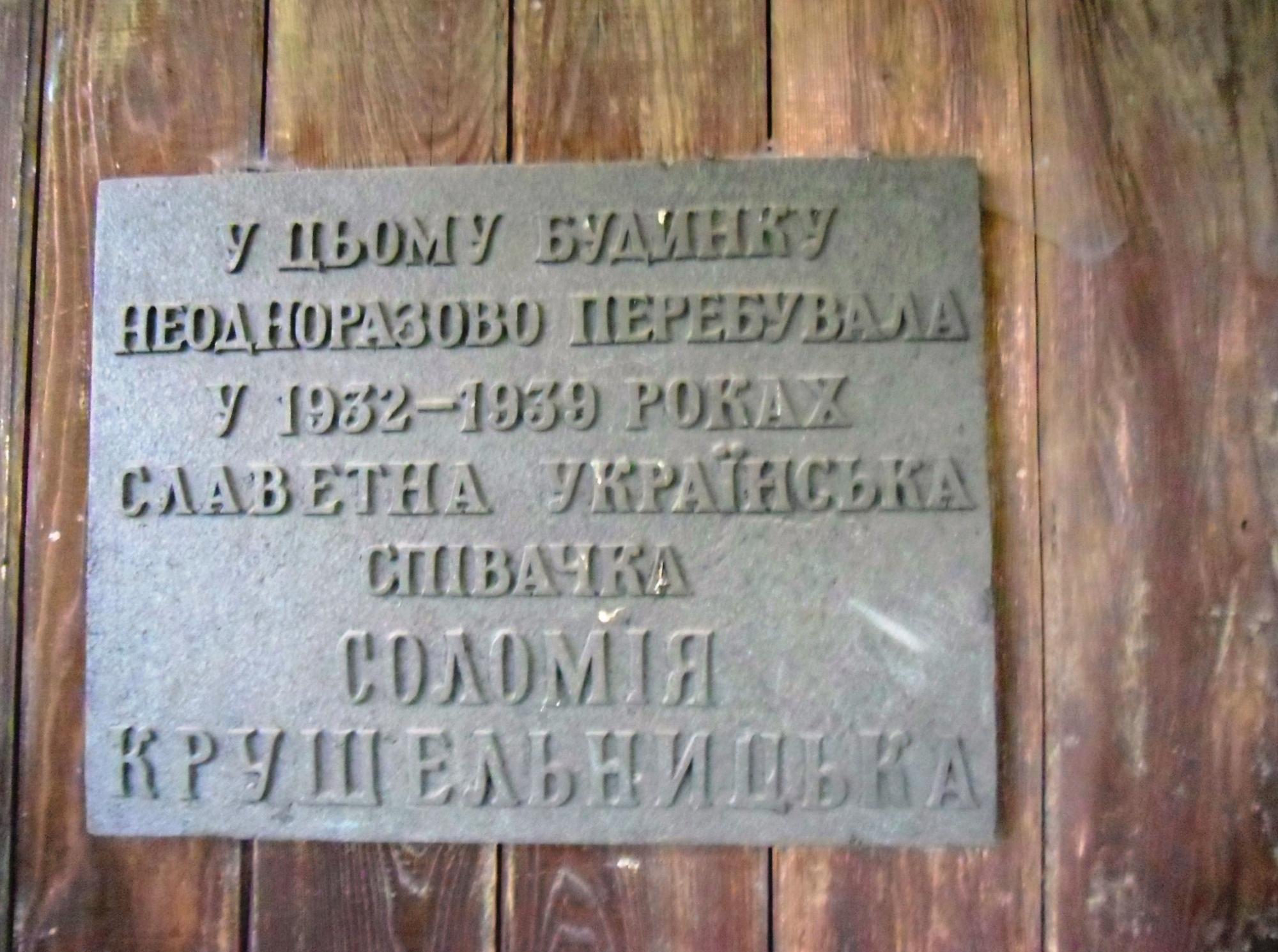
Krushelnytska Solomiya plaque in memory

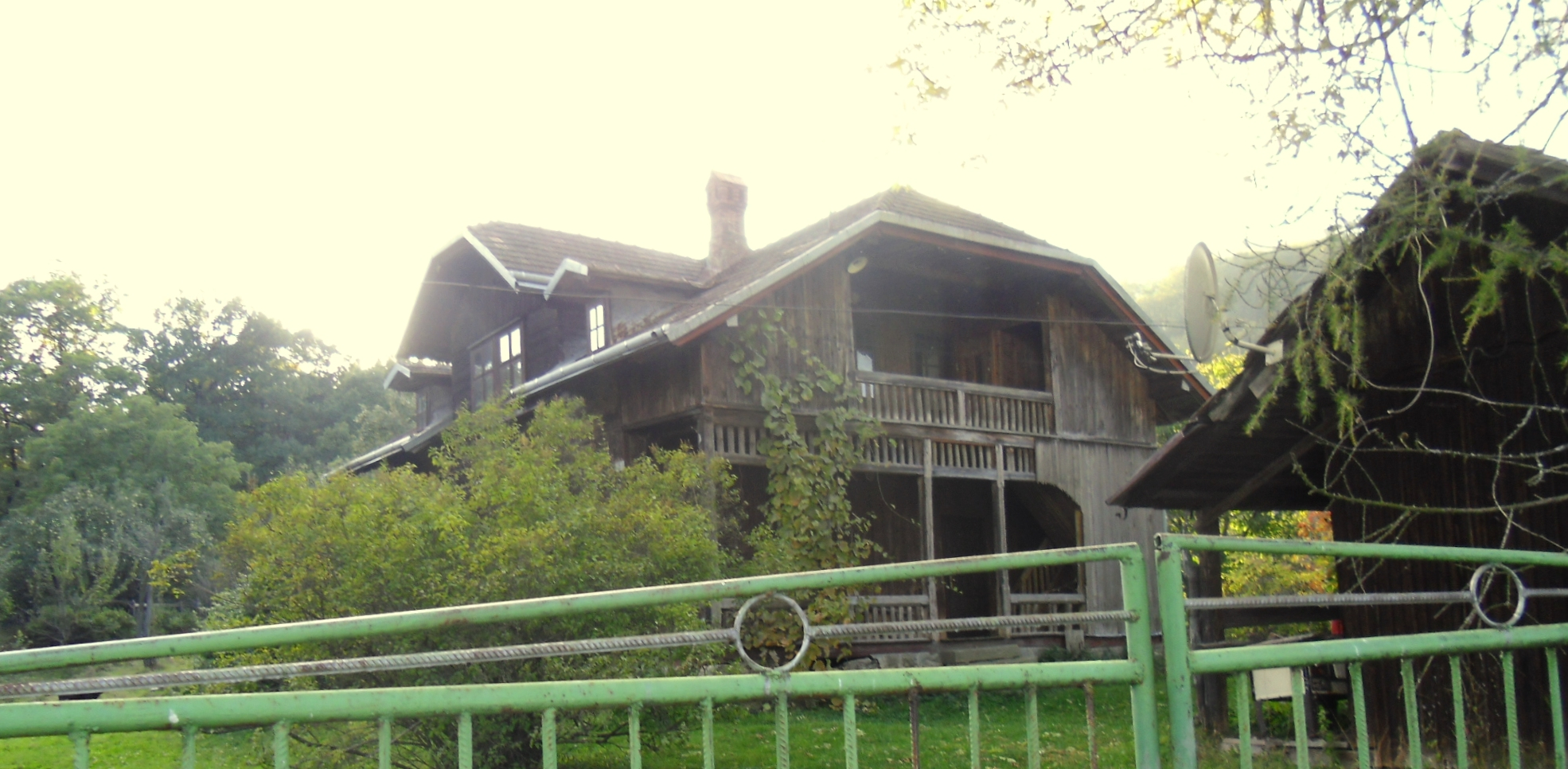
Krushelnytsky – Okhrymovych families cottage house.
