= Korostiv =

Village in Lviv Oblast, Ukraine

- Village
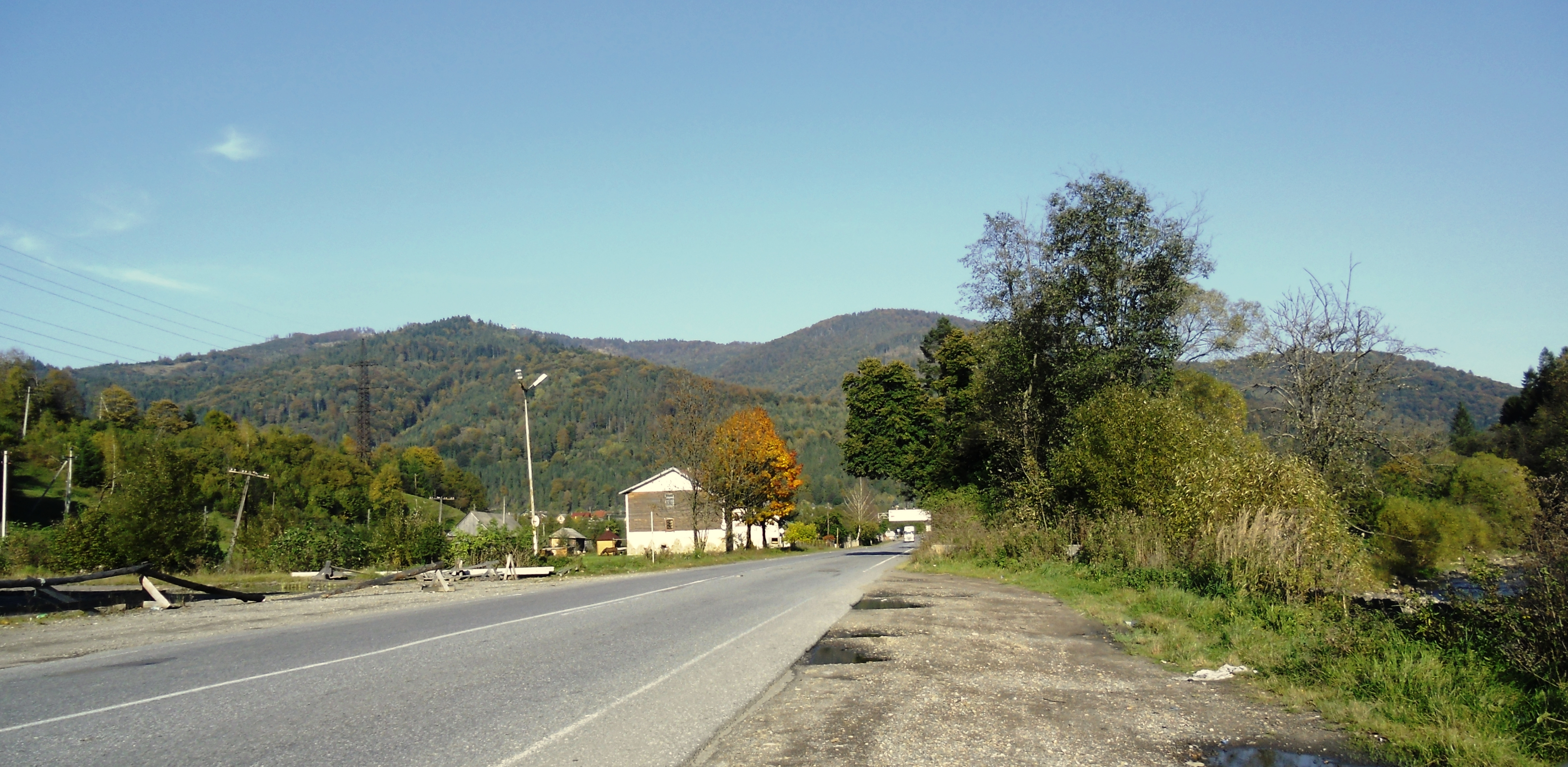

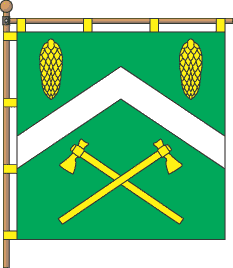
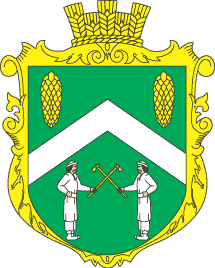
- Flag Coat of arms

- Location within Lviv Oblast
- Coordinates: 49°00′59″N 23°25′32″E
- Country: Ukraine
- Oblast: Lviv Oblast
- Raion: Stryi Raion

Area
  - Total: 128 km^{2} (49 sq mi)
- Elevation: 515 m (1,690 ft)

Population
  - Total: 933
  - Density: 72,891/km^{2} (188,790/sq mi)
- Website: село Коростів ^{(Ukrainian)}

Korostiv (Ukrainian: Ко́ростів, Polish: Korostów) is a village located in Stryi Raion (district) of Lviv Oblast (province) in western Ukraine. It is situated 118 kilometres (73 mi) from the regional center Lviv, 9 kilometres (5.6 mi) from the city of Skole, and 152 kilometres (94 mi) from Uzhhorod. Korostiv belongs to Skole urban hromada, one of the hromadas of Ukraine.

Local government is administered by the Korostivska village council. Its population is 933.

The first record of Korostiv dates back to 1518.

Until 18 July 2020, Korostiv belonged to Skole Raion. The raion was abolished in July 2020 as part of the administrative reform of Ukraine, which reduced the number of raions of Lviv Oblast to seven. The area of Skole Raion was merged into Stryi Raion.

== Monuments of architecture ==
The village has two buildings listed as architectural monuments of Stryi district.

- The church of St. Paraskeva (wooden)
- The bell tower of the church St. Paraskeva (wooden)
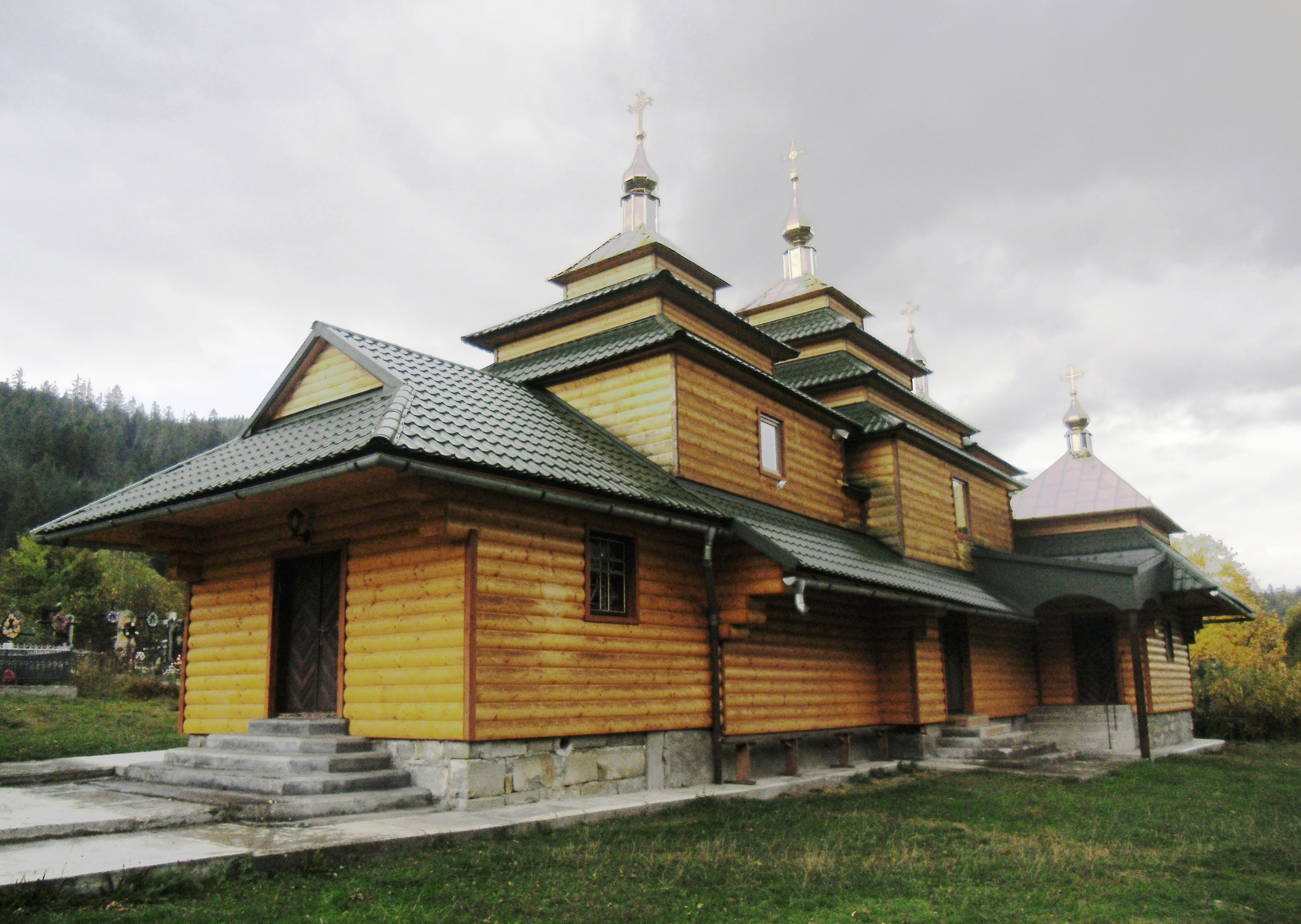

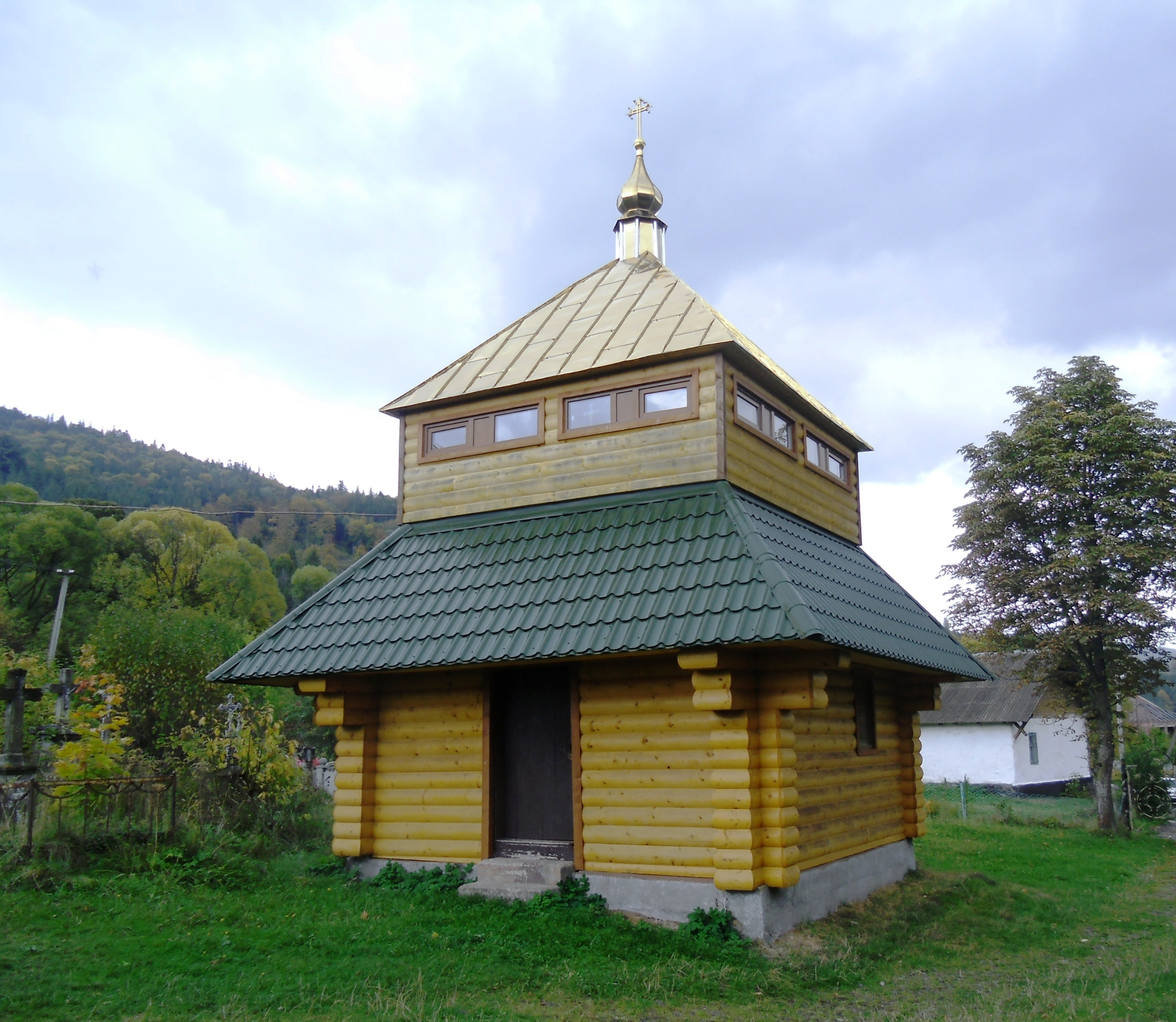

== Literature ==
- Ukrainian: Історія міст і сіл УРСР : Львівська область. – К. : ГРУРЕ, 1968 р. Page 717.
