= Skole urban hromada =

Hromada in Lviv Oblast, Ukraine

Skole urban hromada Сколівська міська громада
- Hromada
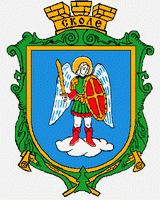
- Seal
- Interactive map of Skole urban hromada
- Country: Ukraine
- Oblast: Lviv Oblast
- Raion: Stryi Raion
- Admin. center: Skole

Area
  - Total: 5,813 km^{2} (2,244 sq mi)

Population (2021)
  - Total: 20,262
  - Density: 3.486/km^{2} (9.028/sq mi)
- CATOTTG code: UA46100190000081766
- Settlements: 17
- Cities: 1
- Rural settlements: 1
- Villages: 15
- Website: skole-rada.gov.ua

Skole urban hromada (Ukrainian: Сколівська міська громада) is a hromada in Ukraine, in Stryi Raion of Lviv Oblast. The administrative center is the city of Skole.

== Settlements ==
The hromada consists of 1 city (Skole), 1 rural settlement (Verkhnie Syniovydne) and 15 villages:

- Hrebeniv
- Dubyna
- Kamianka
- Korostiv
- Korchyn
- Krushelnytsia
- Mezhybrody
- Nyzhnie Synovydne
- Pidhorodtsi
- Pobuk
- Sopit
- Tyshivnytsia
- Trukhaniv
- Urych
- Yamelnytsia
