= Verkhnie Synovydne =

Rural locality in Lviv Oblast, Ukraine

Verkhnie Synovydne Верхнє Синьовидне
- Rural settlement
- Location within Lviv Oblast Location within Ukraine
- Coordinates: 49°05′57″N 23°35′00″E
- Country: Ukraine
- Oblast: Lviv Oblast
- Raion: Stryi Raion
- Hromada: Skole urban hromada
- Established: 1561

Area
  - Total: 36.2 km^{2} (14.0 sq mi)
- Elevation /(average value of): 380 m (1,250 ft)

Population (2022)
  - Total: 3,271
  - Density: 90.4/km^{2} (234/sq mi)
- Time zone: UTC+2 (EET)
  - Summer (DST): UTC+3 (EEST)
- Postal code: 82613
- Area code: +380 3251
- Website: смт Верхнє Синьовидне ^{(Ukrainian)}

Verkhnie Synovydne (Ukrainian: Верхнє Синьовидне), formerly known, until 1946, as Synovydsko Vyzhnie (Ukrainian: Синьовидсько Вижнє, Polish: Synowódzko Wyżne) is a rural settlement in Stryi Raion, Lviv Oblast, of Western Ukraine. It belongs to Skole urban hromada, one of the hromadas of Ukraine. Verkhnie Synovydne was granted the status of urban-type settlement in 1957. Population: 3,271 (2022 estimate).

The settlement is located along the Opir River. It is situated 100 kilometres (62 mi) from the regional center Lviv, 9 kilometres (5.6 mi) from the city of Skole and is located along the Highway M06 (Ukraine). It is a Ukrainian international highway (M-highway) connecting Kyiv to the Hungarian border near Chop, where it connects to the Hungarian Highway M34.

Its total area is 3.62 km^{2}, and the population is around 3,348 people. Local government is administered by Verkhnie Synovydne Settlement Council.

== History ==
The first written record of its mention dates from 1561. But archaeological studies indicate that in this location people lived in the days of Kievan Rus and Principality of Galicia–Volhynia. That are approximately the year 1240.

Until 18 July 2020, Verkhnie Synovydne belonged to Skole Raion. The raion was abolished in July 2020 as part of the administrative reform of Ukraine, which reduced the number of raions of Lviv Oblast to seven. The area of Skole Raion was merged into Stryi Raion.

Until 26 January 2024, Verkhnie Synovydne was designated urban-type settlement. On this day, a new law entered into force which abolished this status, and Verkhnie Synovydne became a rural settlement.

== Literature ==
- Ukrainian: Історія міст і сіл УРСР : Львівська область. – К. : ГРУРЕ, 1968 р., сторінка 715
