= Skole =

City in Lviv Oblast, Ukraine

Skole Сколе
- City
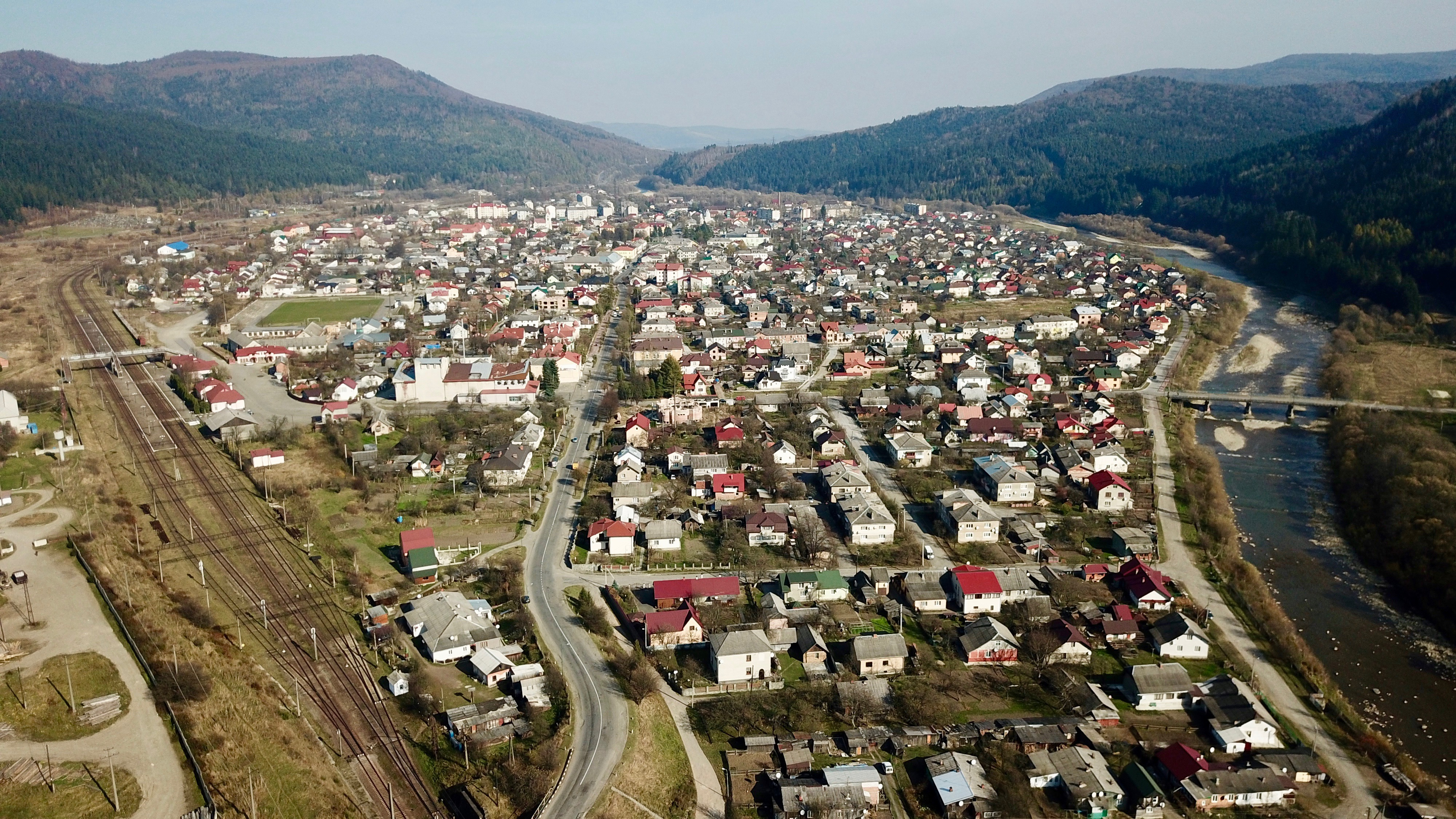
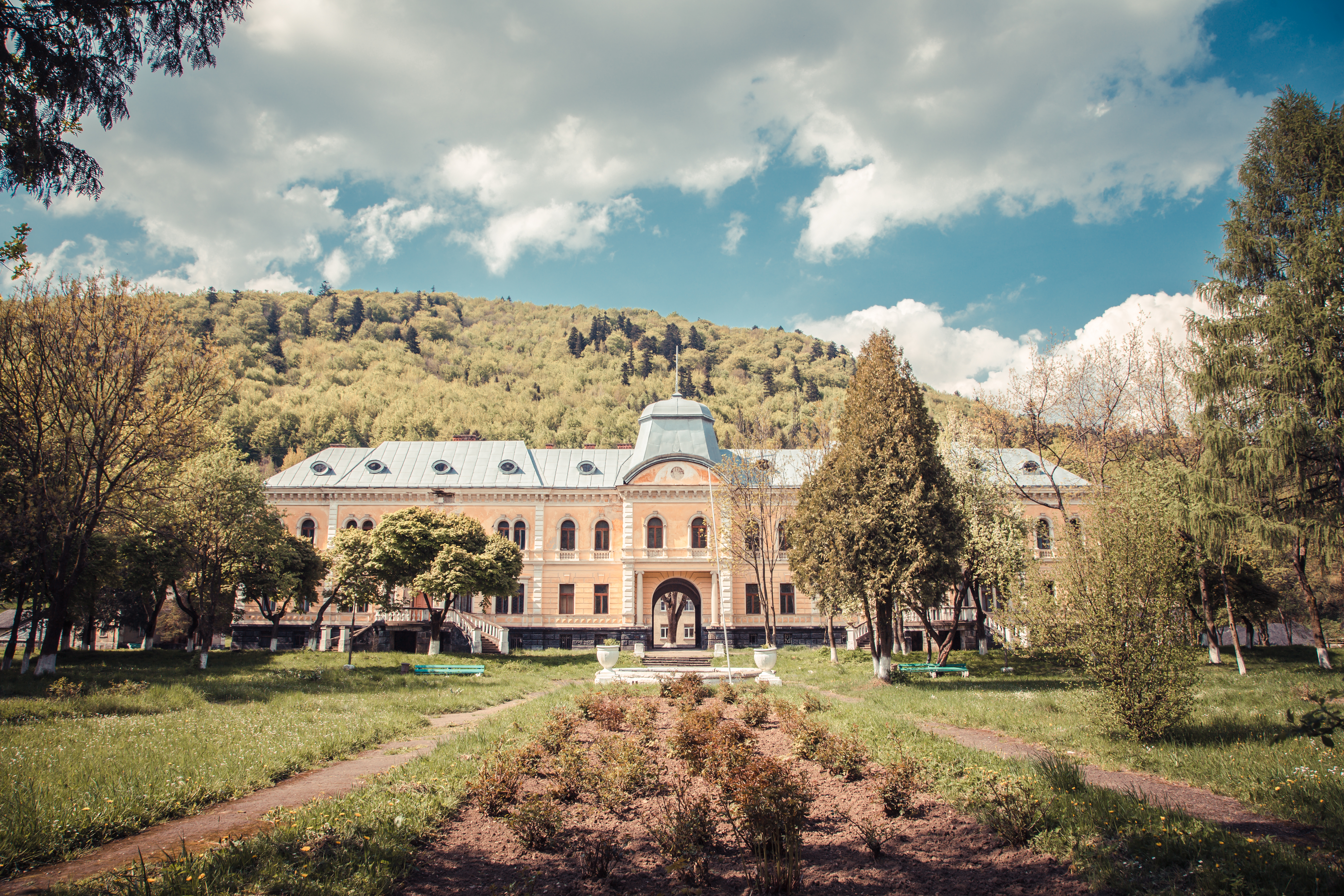
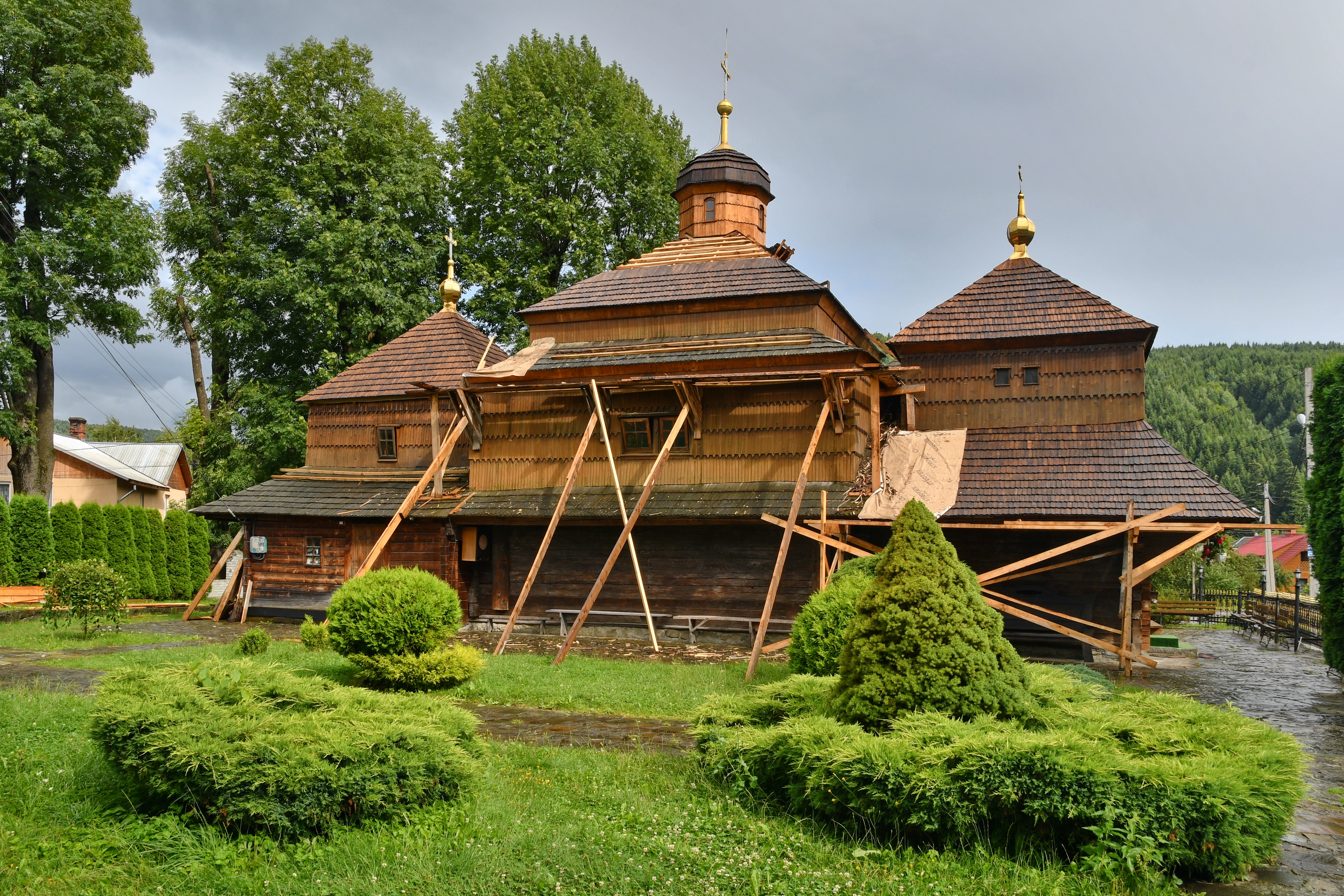
- Top: aerial view of Skole; bottom left: Groedel Palace and Park; bottom right: Saint Paraskeva Church

- Coat of arms
- Interactive map of Skole
- Location of Skole in Lviv Oblast Location of Skole in Ukraine
- Coordinates: 49°02′N 23°31′E
- Country: Ukraine
- Oblast: Lviv Oblast
- Raion: Stryi Raion
- Hromada: Skole urban hromada
- First mentioned: 1397

Population (2022)
  - Total: 6,054
- Time zone: UTC+2 (EET)
  - Summer (DST): UTC+3 (EEST)

Skole (Ukrainian: Сколе, IPA: [ˈskɔle]) is a small city in Stryi Raion, Lviv Oblast (region), Ukraine. It hosts the administration of Skole urban hromada, one of the hromadas of Ukraine.

Population: 6,054 (2022 estimate).

== History ==
The earliest written mention of Skole was in 1397. But, a settlement existed in Skole since 10th century (Rus' era). A very important route from Kyiv to Hungary ran through Skole; as a result, it was frequently fought over by other nations. When the Skole region was under Polish rule, the Polish king parceled out the land among szlachta. German colonists, particularly craftspeople, who settled in the Skole region promoted the development of its economy. A great influence on the economy and cultural development of the region was Baron Groedl and his family. In Skole, the coins of Baron Groedl were used. They were minted at Vien, a mint which continued to be in use until 1930.

Skole received its Magdeburg rights in 1397, by a decree of King Wladyslaw Jagiello. Until 1772, the town belonged to the Lviv Land, Ruthenian Voivodeship of the Kingdom of Poland. Following the Partitions of Poland, it was annexed by the Habsburg Empire, as part of Austrian Galicia, where Skole remained until 1918. In the interbellum period, it was part of Stryj County, Stanislawow Voivodeship, with population divided between Jewish, Polish and Ukrainian communities, also Germans and Czechs. In its vicinity there were three German villages, Annaberg, Felizienthal and Karlsdorf. Until September 17, 1939 (see Soviet Invasion of Poland), the town housed Battalion Skole of the Border Protection Corps.

Modern Skole is a small town, with favorable conditions for the tourist trade.

Until 18 July 2020, Skole was the administrative center of Skole Raion. The raion was abolished in July 2020 as part of the administrative reform of Ukraine, which reduced the number of raions of Lviv Oblast to seven. The area of Skole Raion was merged into Stryi Raion.

== Mykhailo and Polaho Svystun ==
Mykhailo and Polaho Svystun were farmers in Skole during the German occupation. They have been recognised as Righteous Gentiles who saved Aaron Wilf, Chaya Wilf, Rose Wilf, Moshy Wilf and two other boys lives. They paid with their lives as Ukrainian neighbours burnt them alive in their house. They were given this honor in 1974 and are on the official list stored by Yad Vashem as Svistun, 'Mikhailo & Polaha and son Vasily'.

== Architecture ==
The city has two monuments of cultural heritage in Ukraine.

- Church of St. Paraskeva (wooden) 17th century.
- The bell tower of the church St. Paraskeva (wooden) 1760.
- Church of the Nativity Blessed Virgin Mary.

== Gallery ==
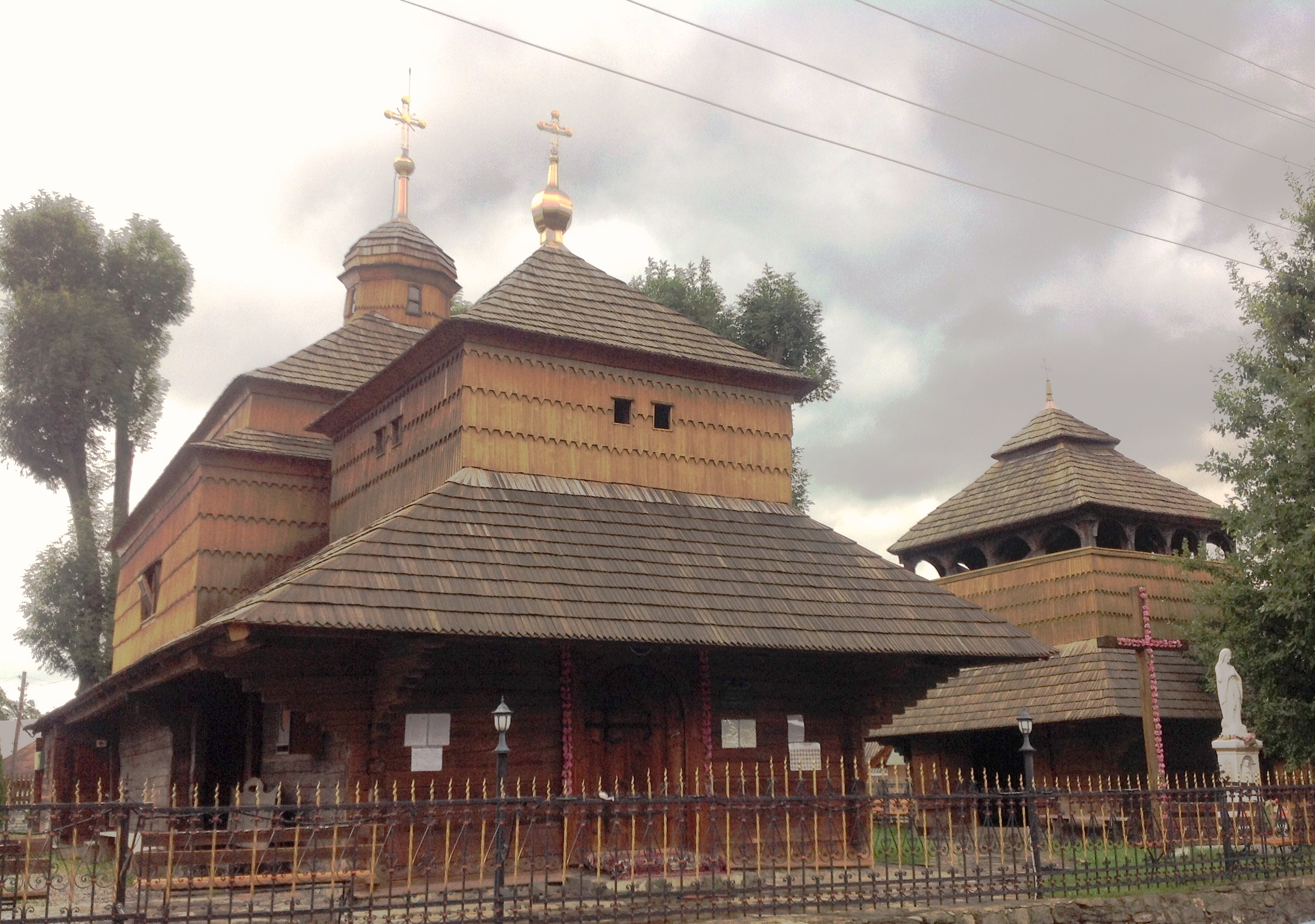
Church and the bell tower of the church St.Paraskeva

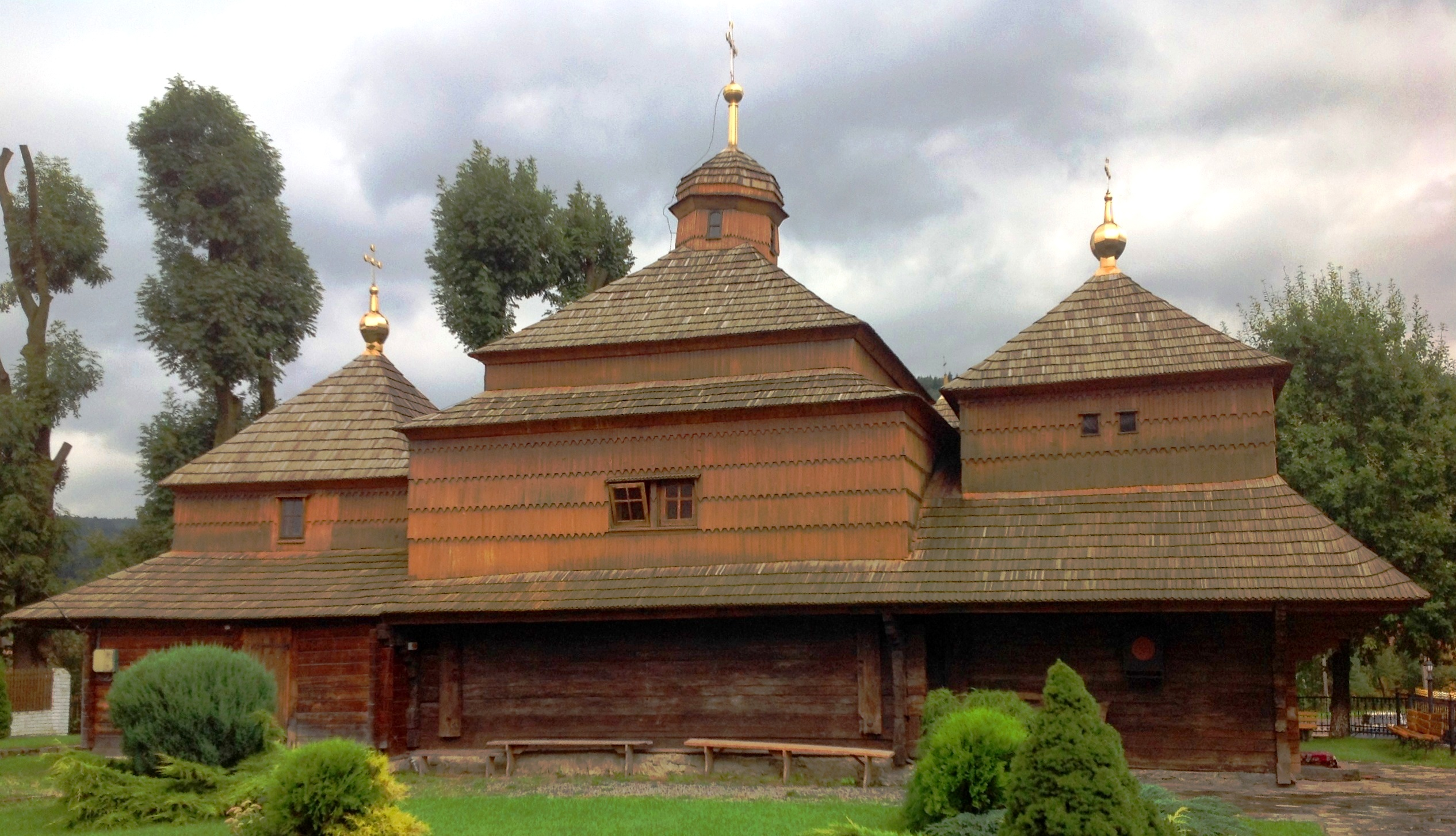
Church of St.Paraskeva (wooden) 17th century

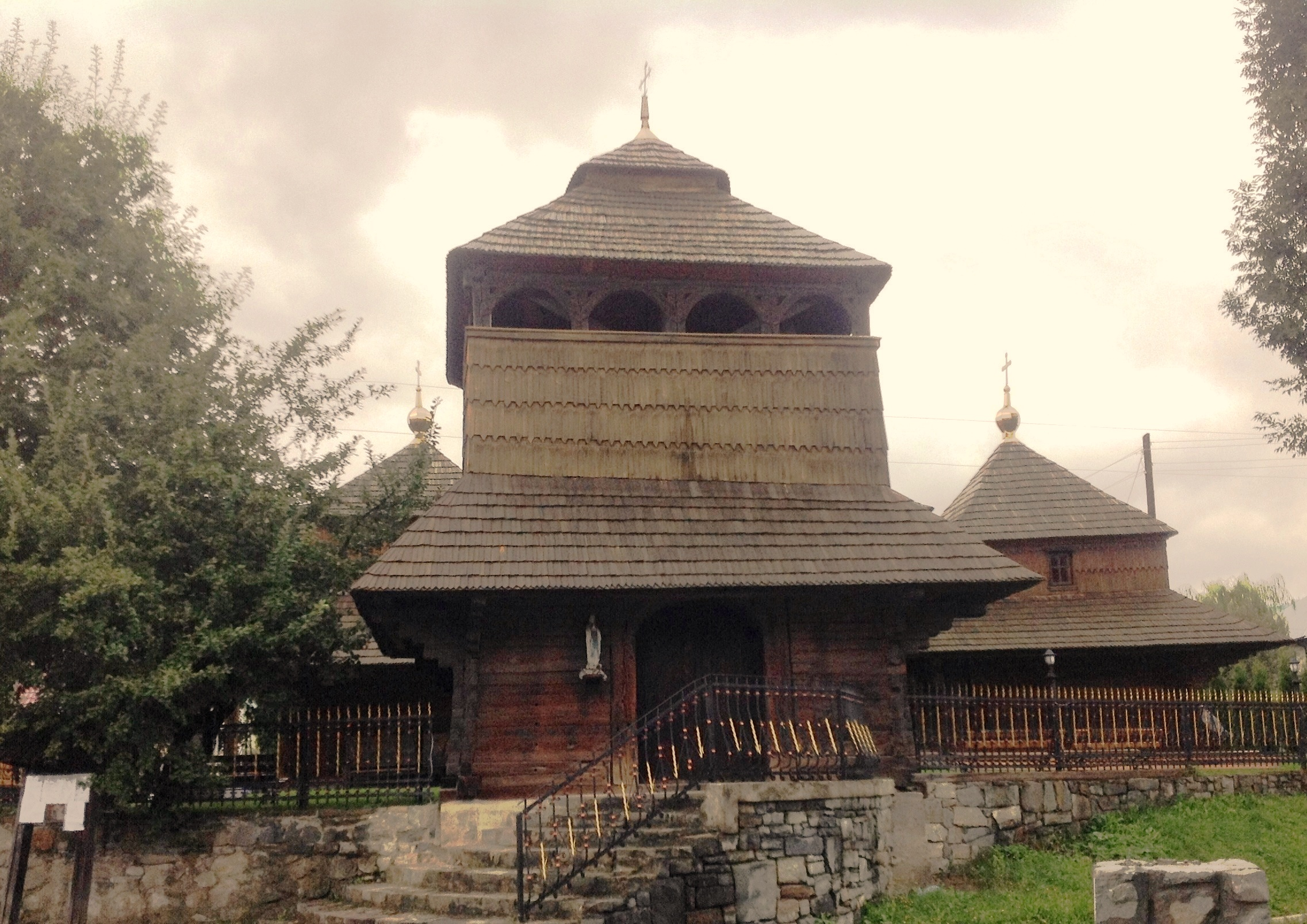
The bell tower of the church St.Paraskeva (wooden) 1760

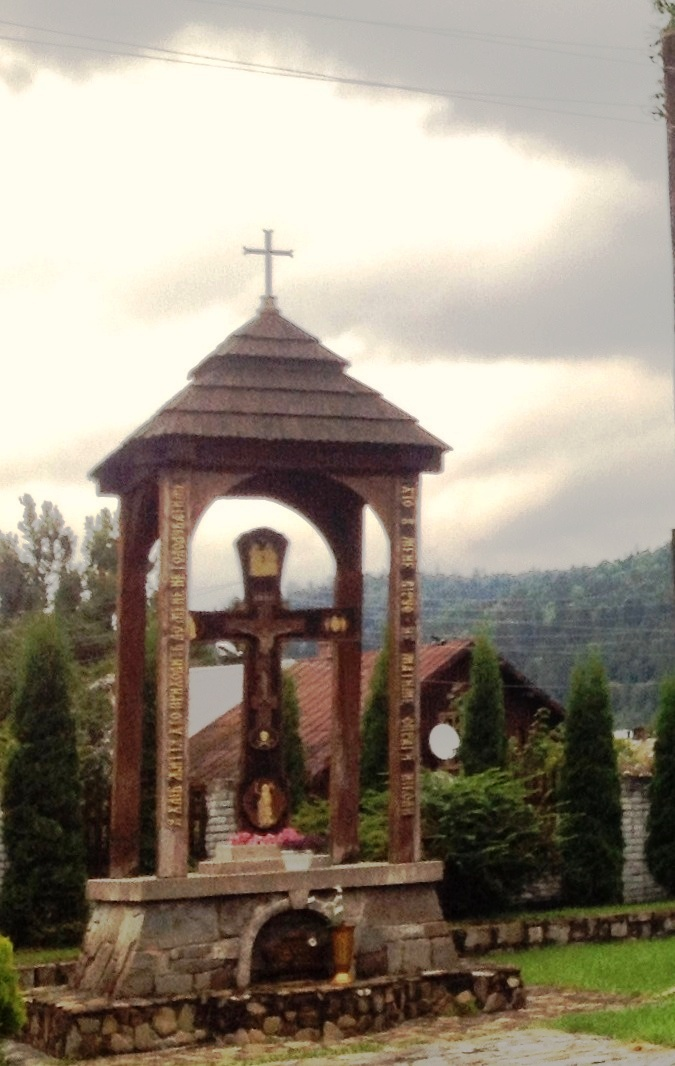
The cross near the church St.Paraskeva

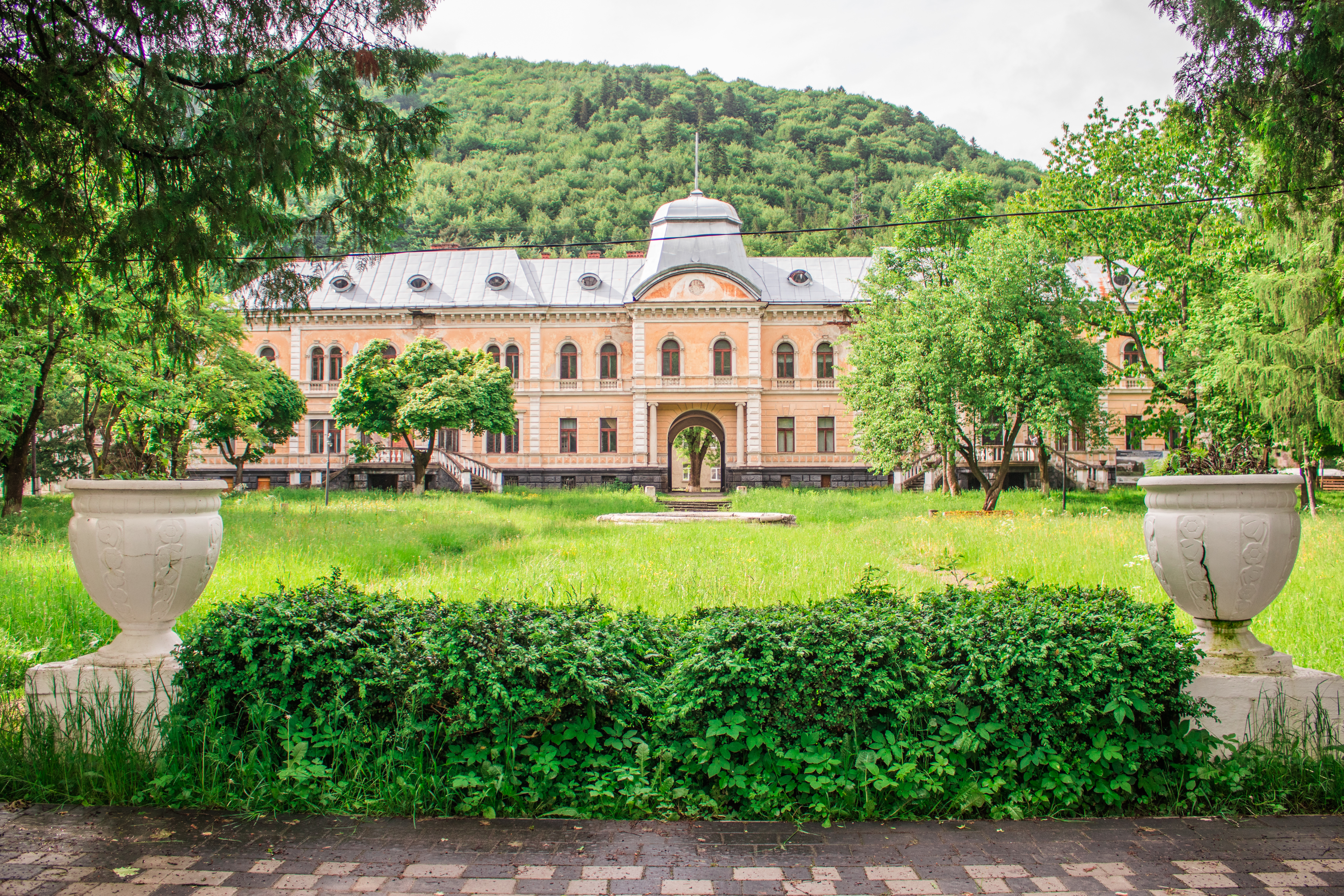
Groedel family palace in Skole

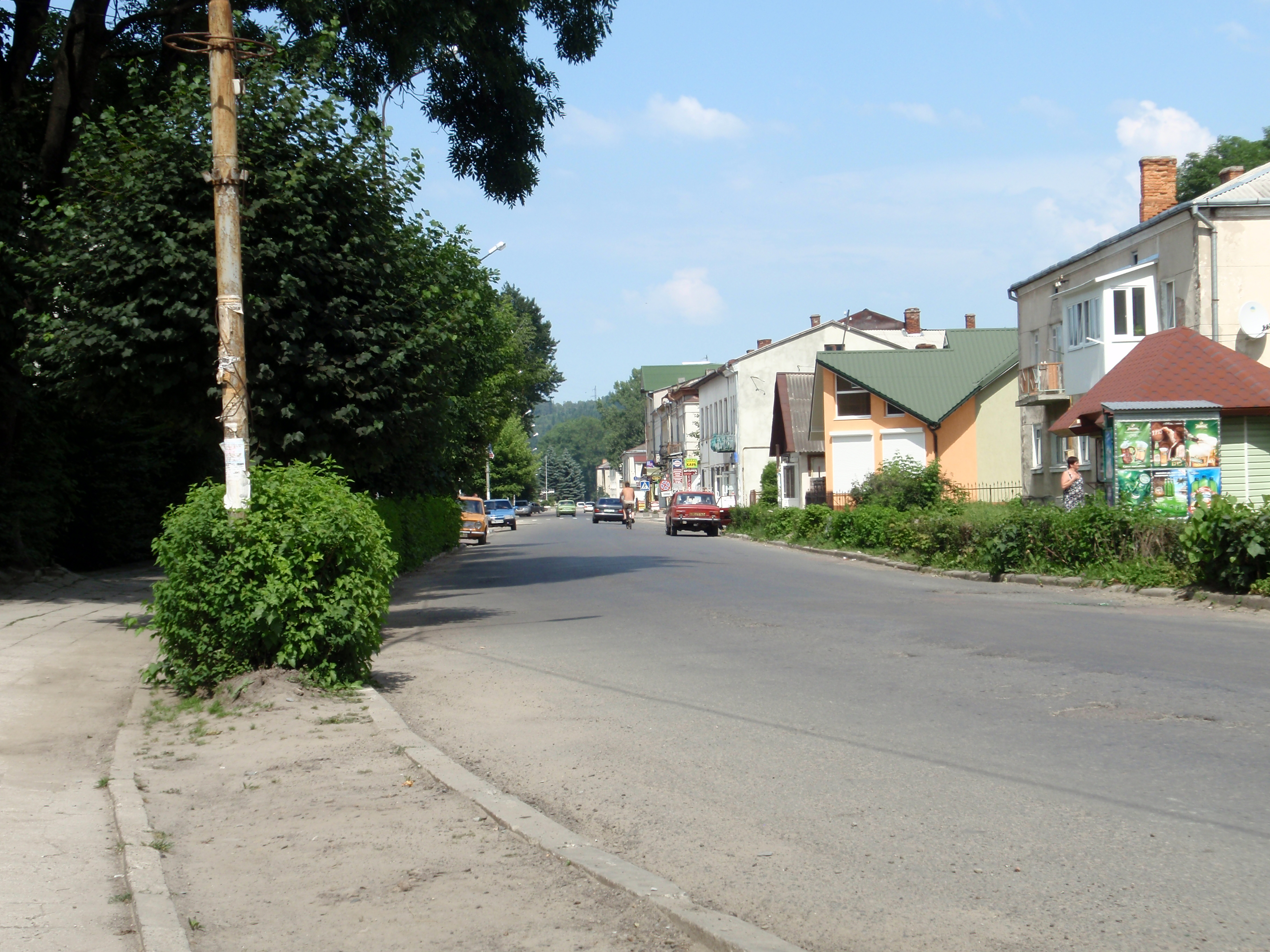
Downtown Skole

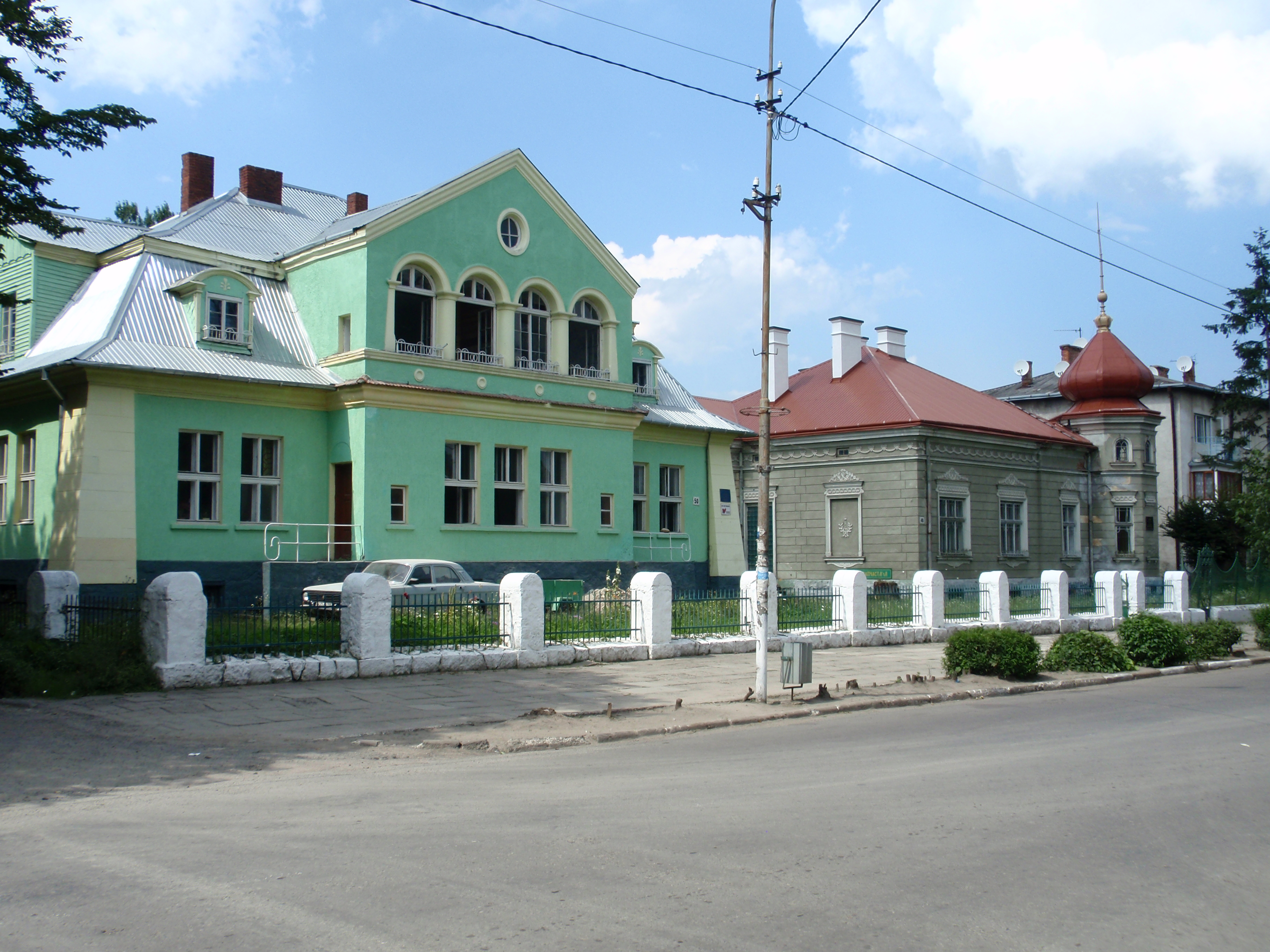
Magnates' houses in Skole

== Region ==
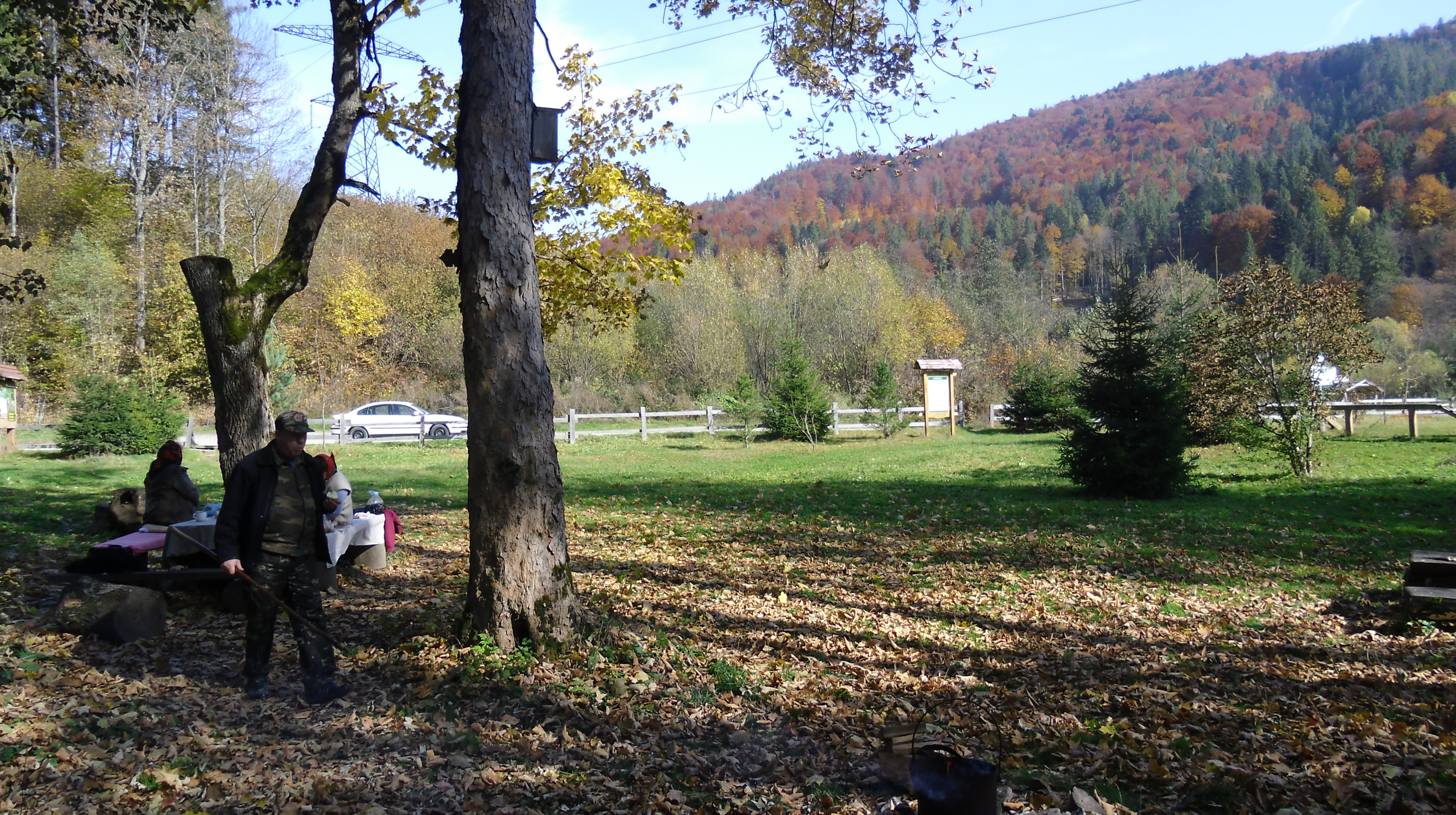
Place of rest in the Ukrainian Carpathians. Skole district, Lviv region.

- The area of Skole Raion is 1,474 km^{2} (569 sq mi).
- The population is 50,188 persons.
- The district consists of 57 villages.

There are many notable places in the Skole region. The village of Grebeniv, for example, was once renowned for its sanitarium where Metropolit Sheptytskyy and prime minister Cherchel were treated. Verchne Synevydne is the first remembrance in the Galician–Volhynian Chronicle (1240). This history is concerned with the person of Danylo Galytskyy.

== Tustan' ==
About 25 million years ago in the Neogene period of the Cenozoic era, the sandstone Carpathian Mountains were formed. Some of them emerged on the Earth's surface. In geology they are known as Iamna sandstone (named for the village of Iamna). The complex consists of Kamin’ (stone), Ostryy Kamin’ (sharp stone), Mala Skelia (small rocks), and Zholob (gutter). In some places sandstone formed into monoliths, and in other places as chaotic rocks. There are many cracks, burdens and caves; some man-made.

The sandstone was subject to erosion, creating exotic shapes (“Chotyry Veletni” or Four Giants, “Try Pal’tsi” or Three Fingers, “Chotyry Spysy” or Four Lances, and “Orel” or Eagle); there are many myths and legends pertaining to these rock formations.

In 3000 BC a sanctuary was built on these rocks. Scientists discovered 270 petroglyphs. From the 9th to the 13th centuries, the fortress of Tustan' existed on these rocks. 4,000 grooves and glades have been discovered. An outline of the fortifications has been reconstructed at the site.

The sandstone in Urych is a natural phenomenon with scientific, recreational, aesthetic, historical and cultural value. At present the Tustan' sandstone formations is a state history and cultural reserve visited every year by more than 3,000 people.

== Notable people ==
- Stanisław Głąbiński, Polish politician, academic, lawyer and writer.
- Isaac Hayyut (died 1726), rabbi
- Yaroslav Koshiv, Ukrainian journalist
- Vasyl Kravchuk, skier
- Beata Obertyńska, writer
- Nataliya Obmochaeva (Nataliya Goncharova), Russian volleyball player.
- Stepan Okhrymovych (Stepan Ochrymowycz), member of the Ukrainian nationalist movement, the leader of the Organization of Ukrainian Nationalists in Western Ukraine

== See also ==
- Slavsko
- Skolye (Hasidic dynasty)
