= History of Bielsko-Biała =

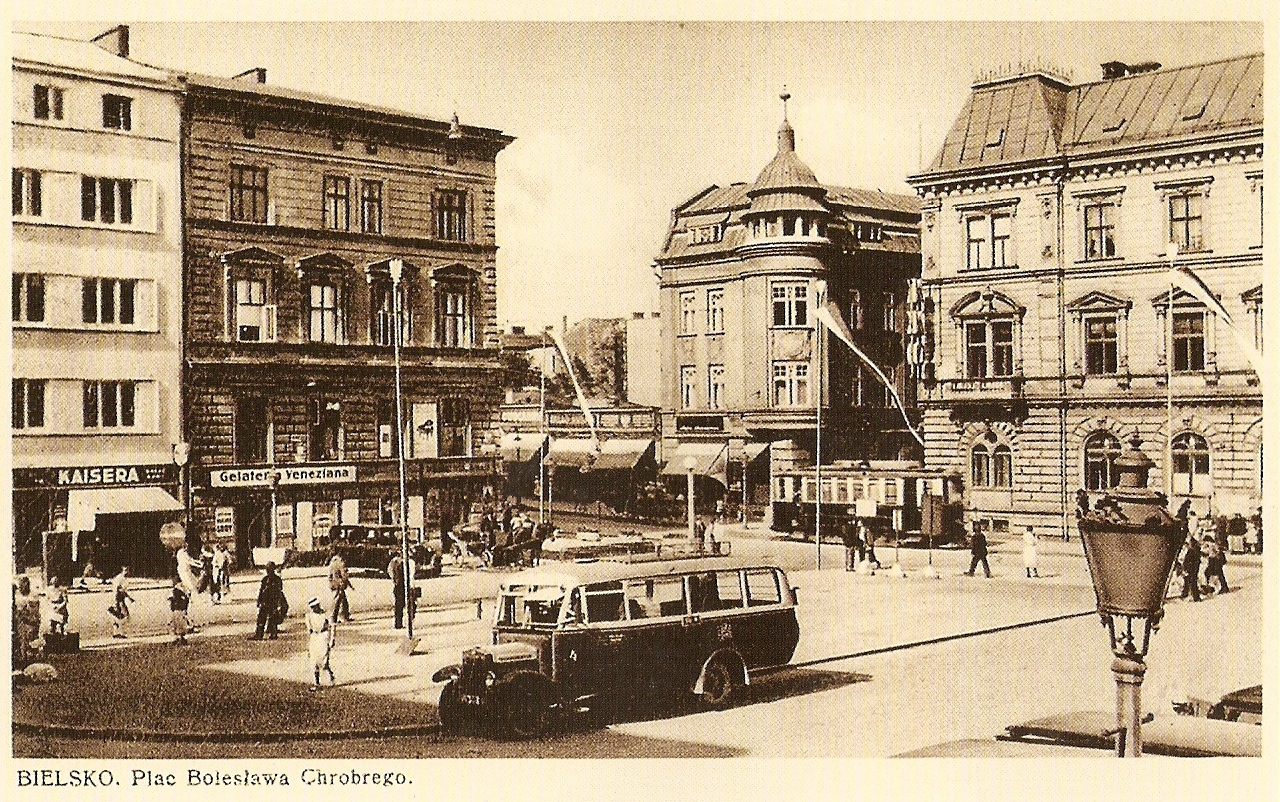
Bielsko city center in the 1930s

Bielsko-Biała is a city in southern Poland created after the merging of two closely situated cities, Bielsko and Biała, in 1951. As separate entities, the cities have a lengthy history.

== Early history ==
The area became part of the emerging Polish state under the Piast dynasty in the 10th century.

Between 1933 and 1938 an archaeological team discovered remains of a fortified settlement in what is now Stare Bielsko (Old Bielsko) district of the city. The settlement was dated to the 12th - 14th centuries. Its dwellers manufactured iron from ore and specialized in smithery.

The current center of the town was probably developed as early as the first half of the 13th century. At that time a castle (which still survives today) was built on a hill.

In the second half of the 13th century, the Piast Dukes of Opole invited German settlers to land between Silesia and Lesser Poland in order to colonize the Silesian Beskids. Nearby settlements west of the Biała River were Mikuszowice Śląskie, Kamienica, Stare Bielsko and Komorowice. Nearby settlements east of the river Bialka were Lipnik and Hałcnów. A nearby settlement in the mountains was Wapienica.

After the partition of the Duchy of Opole in 1281, Bielsko passed to the Dukes of Cieszyn. The town was first documented in 1312 when a Duke of Cieszyn granted a town charter. From 1457 the Biała River was the border between Duchy of Cieszyn (within the Holy Roman Empire) and Duchy of Oświęcim, belonged to the Kingdom of Poland.

Biała Krakowska on the opposite bank of the Biała River was granted town rights by King Augustus II the Strong in 1723. The Kronika miasta Białej by Wacław Chamrat is considered as a priceless source for the history of Biała in the 18th Century.

From 1754 to 1849, Bielsko was the capital of the Duchy of Bielsko, ruled by the Polish Sułkowski family.

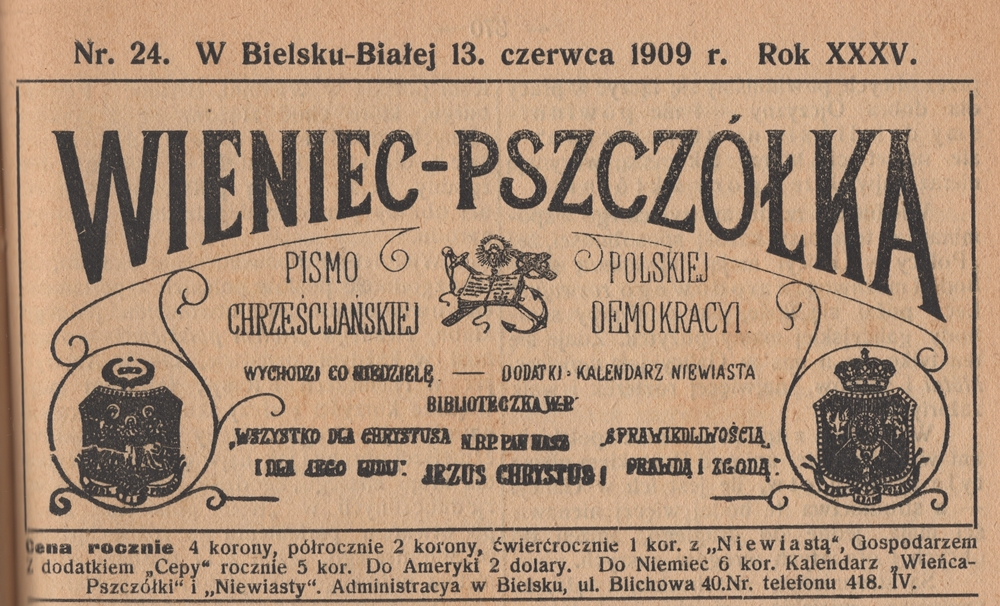
Polish newspaper Wieniec-Pszczółka issued in Bielsko-Biała in 1909

== Modern history ==
During the First Partition of Poland in 1772, Biała was annexed by Austria and included in the crownland of Galicia. In 1918 both cities became part of a reconstituted Polish state, even though the majority of the population was ethnic German.

During the German invasion of Poland, which started World War II, the Einsatzgruppe I entered Bielsko-Biała in the first half of September 1939 to commit various crimes against the Polish and Jewish population. During the war Bielsko-Biała was annexed and occupied by Nazi Germany. In 1939 Germans arrested several Polish teachers and principals who were then deported to Nazi concentration camps and murdered there. A prison for Poles was operated by the Germans in Bielsko-Biała. The Jewish population was sent to the Auschwitz concentration camp.

In 1947, Studio Filmów Rysunkowych was founded.

In the 1950s Greeks, refugees of the Greek Civil War, settled in the city.

=== Local election results ===
The results of municipal elections held in Bielsko in December 1936 are as follows:

Party/Bloc	Seats
Economic Bloc (Polish)	13
Young German Party	7
DSAP-PPS	4 (DSAP 3, PPS 1)
German Christian Party	3
German Party	3
5 Jewish lists	6

== Formation of Bielsko-Biała ==
The city of Bielsko-Biała was created on 1 January 1951 when the adjacent cities of Bielsko and Biała were unified.
