= Bielsko-Biała language island =

Area in Poland that spoke Silesian instead of Polish

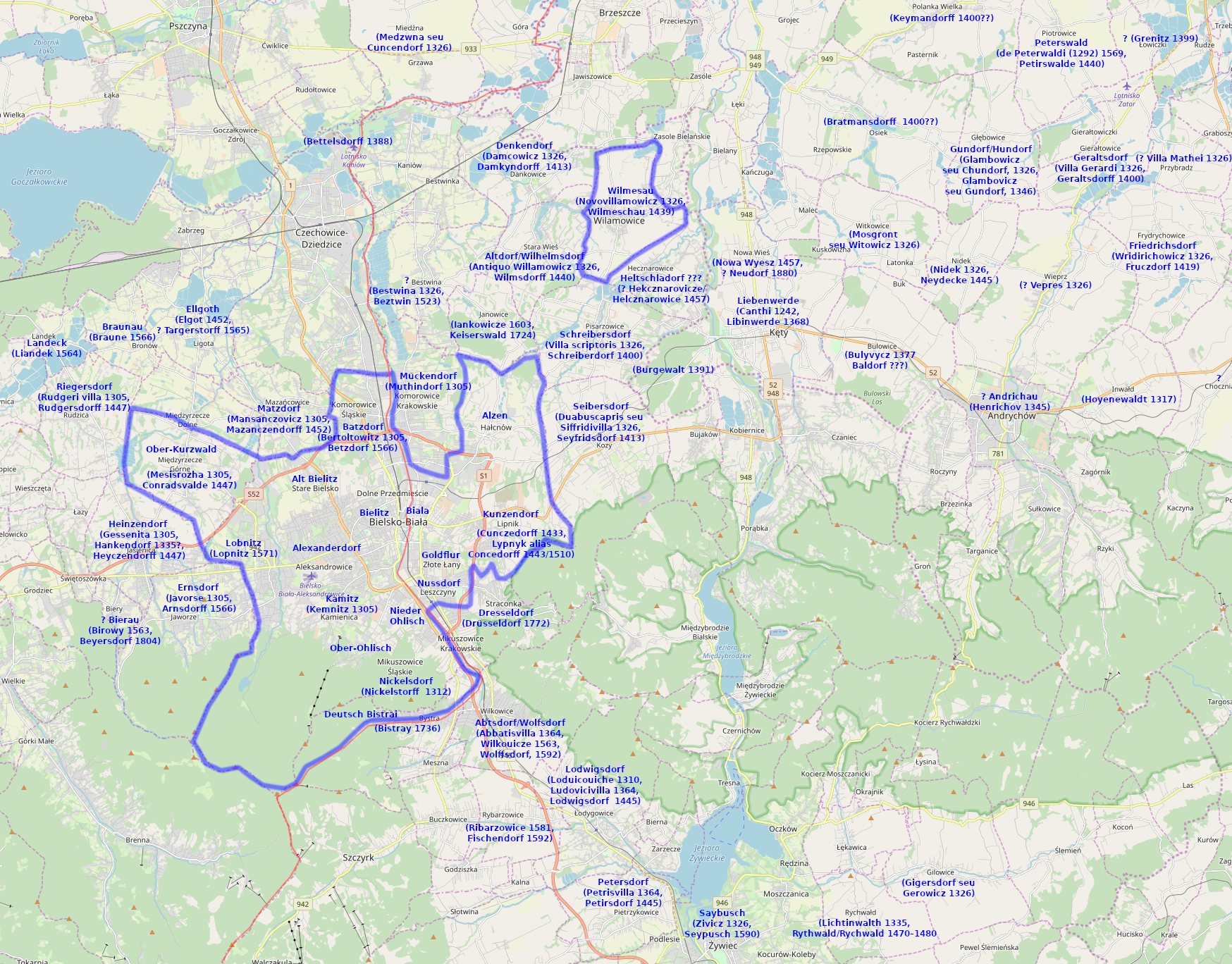
- The borders of the Bielsko-Biała language island before World War II, overlaid on a map of present-day Bielsko-Biała.

Linguistic Classification
- Type: Language island (Sprachinsel)
- Primary Base: Silesian German
- Local Dialects: Alzenau, Hałcnów, Wilamourian elements

Geographical & Historical Context
- Center: Bielsko-Biała (Bielitz-Biala)
- Surrounding Area: Polish-speaking Silesia / Galicia
- Peak Era: 19th century to early 20th century
- Disestablishment: 1945 (following expulsion)

Statistics & Status
- Legacy: Extinct as a community pocket
- Influences remaining in Wilamourian language

The Bielitz-Biała language island or Bielsk language island (German: Bielitz-Bialaer Sprachinsel, Polish: Bielsko-bialska wyspa językowa) was a Silesian German language island within the Polish-speaking areas on the border of Austrian Silesia and Galicia. It existed from the 13th century to approximately 1943 within a region of thirteen towns, most of which fell within the boundaries of modern-day Bielsko-Biała in southern Poland.

Bielsko, which was originally its own city, had the largest German-speaking population in the Duchy of Teschen until after World War Two, when most Germans fled or were expelled by the Soviets under the Potsdam Conference. This deportation is often considered an act of forced Polonization.

== Towns ==
Percentage of German speakers (1880–1910) or Germans (1921–1943)
Town Name	Region	1880	1890	1900	1910	1921	1943
Bielsko (Bielitz)	Silesia	86.5	80.7	84.3	84.3	61.9	72
Biała (Biala)	Galicia	74.5	74.9	78.2	69.4	27.5	part of Bielsko
Wilamowice (Wilmesau)	Galicia	67.0	66.0	—	—	1.4	74
Aleksandrowice (Alexanderfeld)	Silesia	84.4	77.3	87.3	86.2	70.9	part of Bielsko
Bystra Śląska (Deutsch Bistrai)	Silesia	76.9	73.3	64.2	51.7	45.4	51
Hałcnów (Alzen)	Galicia	74.4	77.0	—	—	66.3	74
Kamienica (Kamitz) & Olszówka Górna	Silesia	90.0	89.5	87.1	92.3	76.4	no data
Komorowice Śląskie (Batzdorf)	Silesia	54.0	47.5	49.4	75.4	15.5	56
Lipnik (Kunzendorf) & Leszczyny	Galicia	67.7	57.0	—	—	29.9	46
Międzyrzecze Górne (Ober-Kurzwald)	Silesia	62.0	64.8	62.4	66.5	68.7	67
Mikuszowice Śląskie & Olszówka Dolna	Silesia	85.9	79.4	83.6	82.9	73.7	no data
Stare Bielsko (Alt-Bielitz)	Silesia	86.2	84.7	89.4	91.9	81.3	81
Wapienica (Lobnitz)	Silesia	90.2	66.1	75.1	77.6	82.3	82
