= Karlsdorf, Ukraine =

Former rural locality in Lviv Oblast, Ukraine

Karlsdorf
- Village
- Location within Lviv Oblast Location within Ukraine
- Coordinates: 48°50′00″N 23°10′00″E
- Country: Ukraine
- Oblast: Lviv Oblast
- District: Stryi Raion
- Established: around 1835
- Time zone: UTC+2 (EET)
  - Summer (DST): UTC+3 (EEST)

Karlsdorf (Ukrainian: Карлсдорф) was a village (a German colony) in the vicinity of Klymets, in what is now Stryi Raion, Lviv Oblast, of Western Ukraine.

The village was established around 1835 by Karl Scheiff, the heir of Smozhe. He invited Catholic German settlers from western Bohemia, fueling the society of Galician Germans. In the same year two other nearby German colonies were established in the same way, Felizienthal and Annaberg, forming a small language island. Karlsdorf became a seat of the German-speaking Catholic parish in 1843, which was in 1863 moved to Felizienthal.

In the inter-war period the village belonged to Poland.
