= Dolynivka, Lviv Oblast =

Village in Lviv Oblast, Ukraine

Dolynivka Долинівка
- Village
- Lviv Oblast Dolynivka (Ukraine)
- Coordinates: 48°53′41″N 23°13′52″E
- Country: Ukraine
- Oblast: Lviv Oblast
- District: Stryi Raion
- Established: around 1835

Area
  - Total: 1.37 km^{2} (0.53 sq mi)
- Elevation /(average value of): 729 m (2,392 ft)

Population (2001)
  - Total: 309
  - Density: 226/km^{2} (584/sq mi)
- Time zone: UTC+2 (EET)
  - Summer (DST): UTC+3 (EEST)

Dolynivka (Ukrainian: Долинівка, German: Felizienthal, Polish: Dolnówka) is a village (selo) in Stryi Raion, Lviv Oblast, of Western Ukraine. It belongs to Koziova rural hromada, one of the hromadas of Ukraine.

The village was established around 1835 by Karl Scheiff, the heir of Smozhe. He invited Catholic German settlers from Western Bohemia, fueling the society of Galician Germans. In the same year two other nearby German colonies were established in the same way, Karlsdorf and Annaberg, forming a small language island. Felizienthal became a seat of the German-speaking Catholic parish in 1863, moved here from Karlsdorf.

In the interwar period the village belonged to Poland.

Until 18 July 2020, Dolynivka belonged to Skole Raion. The raion was abolished in July 2020 as part of the administrative reform of Ukraine, which reduced the number of raions of Lviv Oblast to seven. The area of Skole Raion was merged into Stryi Raion.
