= Nahirne, Stryi Raion, Lviv Oblast =

Village in Lviv Oblast, Ukraine

Nahirne Нагі́рне
- Village
- Location within Lviv Oblast
- Coordinates: 48°53′23″N 23°14′57″E
- Country: Ukraine
- Oblast: Lviv Oblast
- District: Stryi Raion
- Established: 1835

Area
  - Total: 493 km^{2} (190 sq mi)
- Elevation /(average value of): 765 m (2,510 ft)

Population
  - Total: 133
  - Density: 2,698/km^{2} (6,990/sq mi)
- Time zone: UTC+2 (EET)
  - Summer (DST): UTC+3 (EEST)
- Postal code: 82642
- Area code: +380 3251
- Website: село Нагірне ^{(Ukrainian)}

Nahirne (Ukrainian: Нагі́рне; originally called Annaberg) is a village (selo) in Stryi Raion, Lviv Oblast, of Western Ukraine. Nahirne is located in the Ukrainian Carpathians, within the limits of the Eastern Beskids (Skole Beskids) in the southern part of the oblast. It belongs to the Koziova rural hromada, one of the hromadas of Ukraine. Local government is administered by the Smozhenska village council.

The village was established around 1835 by Karl Scheiff, the heir of Smozhe. He invited Catholic German settlers from Western Bohemia to form an agricultural colony of Annaberg, fueling the society of Galician Germans. In the same year, two other nearby German colonies were established in the same way, Felizienthal and Karlsdorf, forming a small language island.

Until 18 July 2020, Nahirne belonged to Skole Raion. The raion was abolished in July 2020 as part of the administrative reform of Ukraine, which reduced the number of raions of Lviv Oblast to seven. The area of Skole Raion was merged into Stryi Raion.

The village is situated along Highway M06 (Ukraine) ( M 06) and lies 141 kilometres (88 mi) from the city of Lviv, 32 kilometres (20 mi) from Skole, and 127 kilometres (79 mi) from Uzhhorod.
