= Galician Germans =

Ethnic German population in Austrian Poland

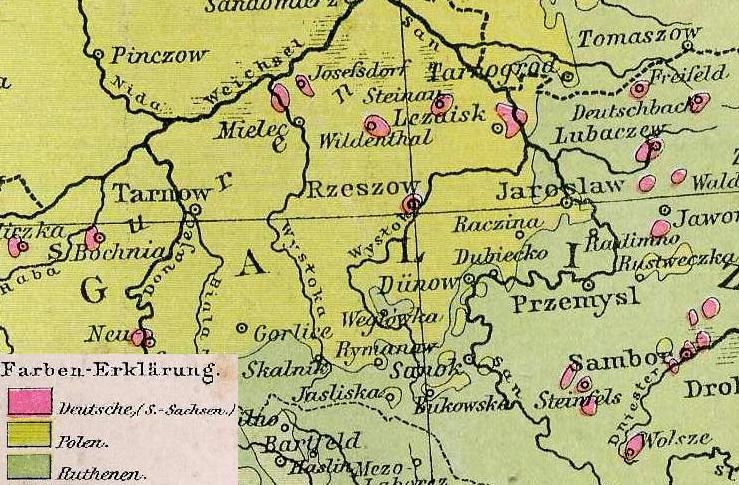
German language islands in the middle of Austrian Galicia (1880)

The Galician Germans (German: Galiziendeutsche; Polish: Niemcy galicyjscy; Ukrainian: Галицькі німці) were an ethnic German population living in the Kingdom of Galicia and Lodomeria in the Austrian Empire, established in 1772 as a result of the First Partition of Poland, and after World War I in the four voivodeships of interwar Poland: Kraków, Lwów, Tarnopol, and Stanisławów. During World War II, part of the Galician Germans were relocated in January 1940 in the course of Heim ins Reich; the majority of the remaining population later fled the region in 1944–1945.

== History ==
The first wave of ethnic Germans arrived in what would later be known as Galicia in the late Middle Ages (see Ostsiedlung). In part of the region the settlers were known as Walddeutsche. Most of them underwent Polonization at latest in the 18th century.

Long before the First Partition of Poland in 1772 a small German language island existed on the western tip of the would-be Galicia in Biała and its vicinity (Hałcnów, Lipnik). Another one was established around 1750 in Zalishchyky, which, however, was partially depopulated before 1772. In 1774 Maria Theresa issued a patent aiming to lure German artisans into several local cities, without significant result. The first meaningful settlement campaign took place in the 1780s, the Josephine colonization, which facilitated the arrival of over 3,200 ethnic German families (around 14,400 people).

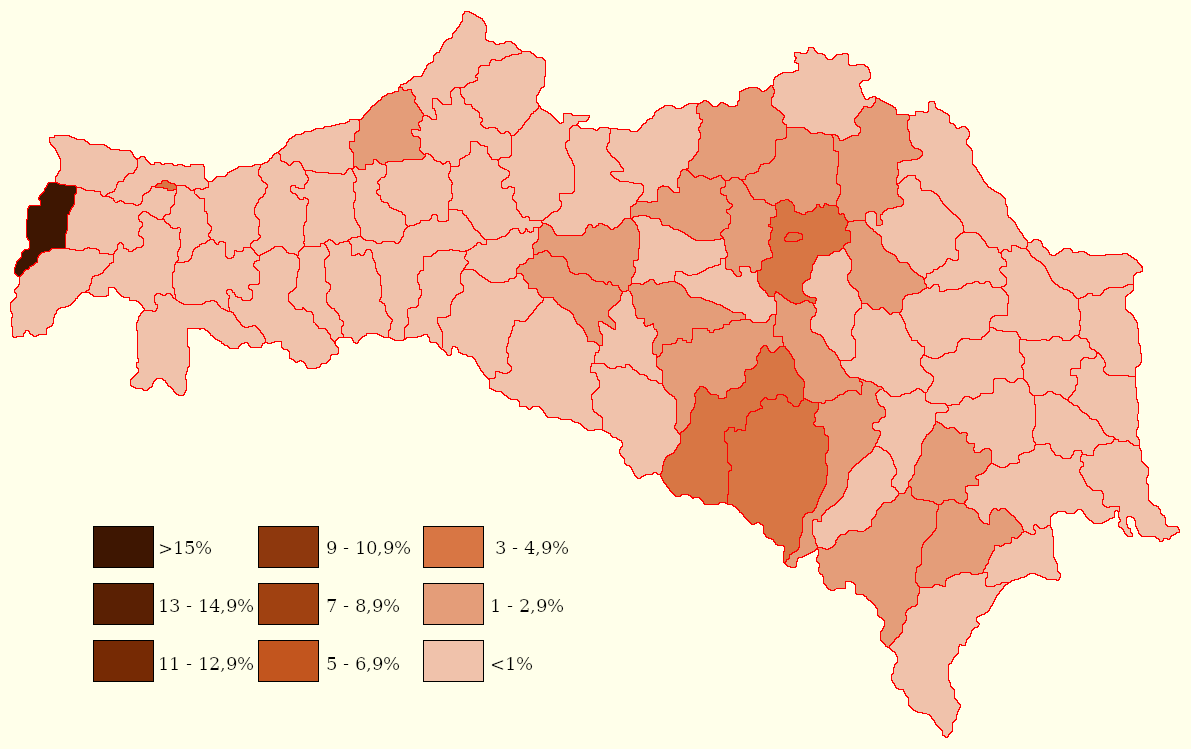
Percentage of ethnic Germans in the Kingdom of Galicia and Lodomeria (Austria-Hungary) in 1900, by district

Descendants of the Josephine settlers were allowed to establish daughter settlements afterwards (like, for example, Baginsberg in the neighbourhood of Kolomyia, in 1818). Furtherly, smaller settlements took place in the years 1802–1805 (1,200 families) and 1811–1848 (400 families).

A part of this colonies lost its ethnic German character in the following decades, especially in the western Galicia. More settlements proved to be prolific in the eastern Galicia. In the meantime, the German-speaking population grew slowly in the Galician cities.

According to the Austrian census from 1900 there were 212,327 (or 2.7%) German-speaking people in Galicia. Of this number around 80,000 constituted German Christians. The rest came from part of the Galician Jews (the census did not give the opportunity to declare Yiddish language), of whom roughly 20,000 considered themselves German. As a German-speaking was also qualified the population of Wilamowice, traditionally speaking Wymysorys language.

After World War I, Galicia became a part of the Second Polish Republic. Many of the colonies retained their previous names, however in the late 1930s the Polish government decided to change them to ones sounding more Polish, e.g. Neudorf to Polminowice.

The Polish census of 1931 counted in total 40,393 Germans in former Galicia, including 23,586 Protestants and 15,842 Roman Catholics.

== Examples of post-Josephine settlements ==
- Annaberg, now Nahirne, established in 1835;
- Felizienthal, now Dolynivka, est. 1835;
- Karlsdorf, est. 1835;

== See also ==
- Germans in Ukraine
