= Linguistic island =

Linguistic island may refer to:

- Language island (language enclave), an area
- Island (linguistics) (syntactic island), a construction
