= Klymets =

Village in Lviv Oblast, Ukraine

Klymets Климець Klimiets
- Village
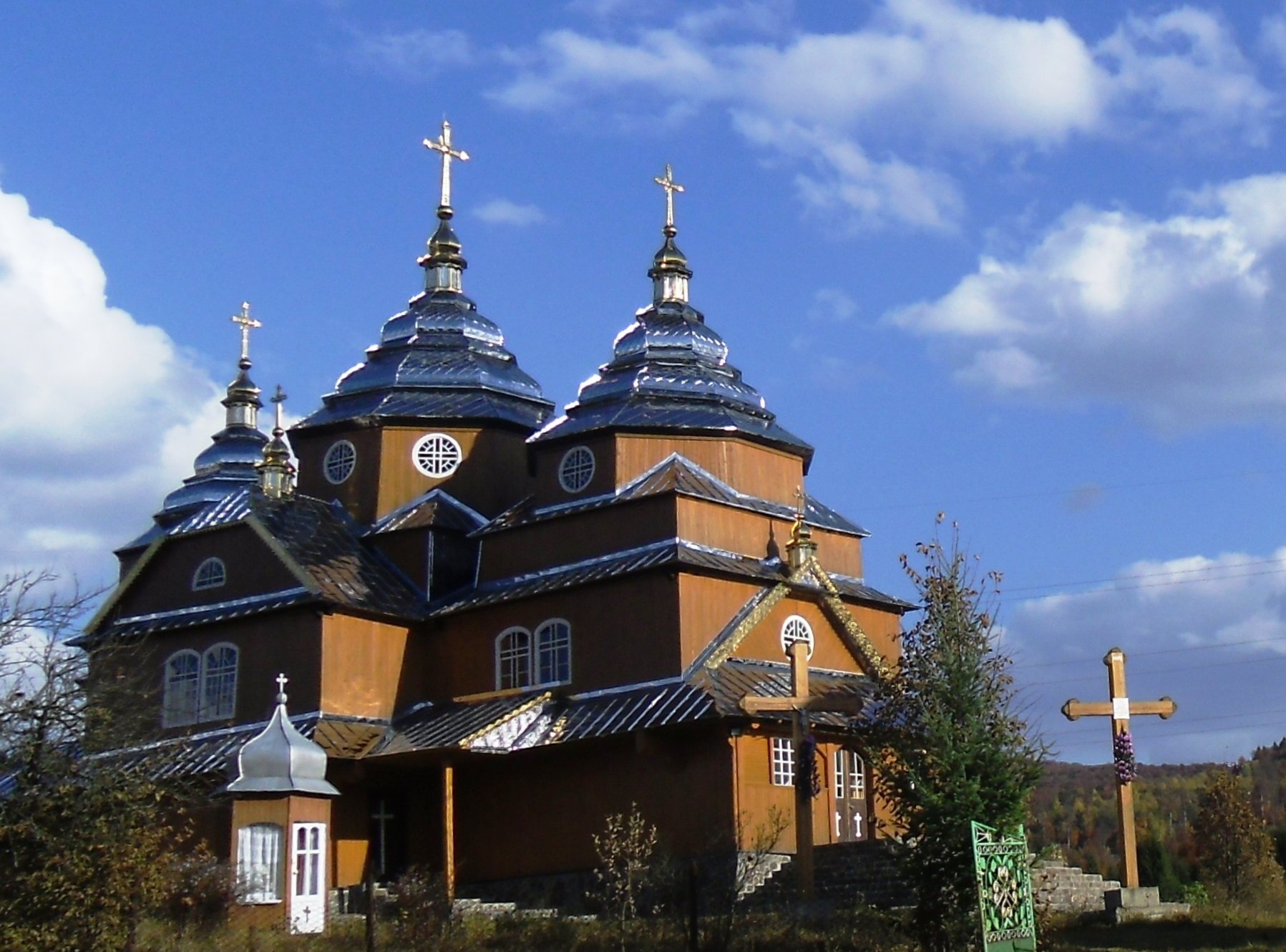

- Location of Klymets inf Lviv Oblast Location of Klymets in Ukraine
- Coordinates: 48°50′19″N 23°10′41″E
- Country: Ukraine
- Oblast: Lviv Oblast
- District: Stryi Raion
- Established: 1565

Area
  - Total: 128 km^{2} (49 sq mi)
- Elevation /(average value of): 777 m (2,549 ft)

Population
  - Total: 342
  - Density: 26,719/km^{2} (69,200/sq mi)
- Time zone: UTC+2 (EET)
  - Summer (DST): UTC+3 (EEST)
- Postal code: 82650
- Area code: +380 3251
- Website: 1ua.com.ua/c146613 (in Ukrainian)

Klymets (Ukrainian: Климе́ць, Polish: Klimiec; German: Klimetz) is a selo (village) in Stryi Raion, Lviv Oblast, of western Ukraine. More specifically, it is located in the Ukrainian Carpathians, within the limits of the Eastern Beskids (Skole Beskids) in southwestern part of the oblast. Klymets belongs to Koziova rural hromada, one of the hromadas of Ukraine. It is situated 149 kilometres (93 mi) from the regional center Lviv, 40 kilometres (25 mi) from the district center Skole, and 113 kilometres (70 mi) from Uzhhorod.

Local government is administered by the Klymetska village council.

== History ==
The first written record indicates that the date of foundation is considered to be 1565.

There is other information indicating that the village was established by German colonialists that, in Austrian times, founded a colony Karlsdorf (German for Karl's village). The colony existed before the Second World War.

Przemyśl Lands, including Skole District, mercilessly suffered attacks from Tatar-Mongol invasion of Kievan Rus'. A massive flight of peasants was observed at the beginning of the 18th century.

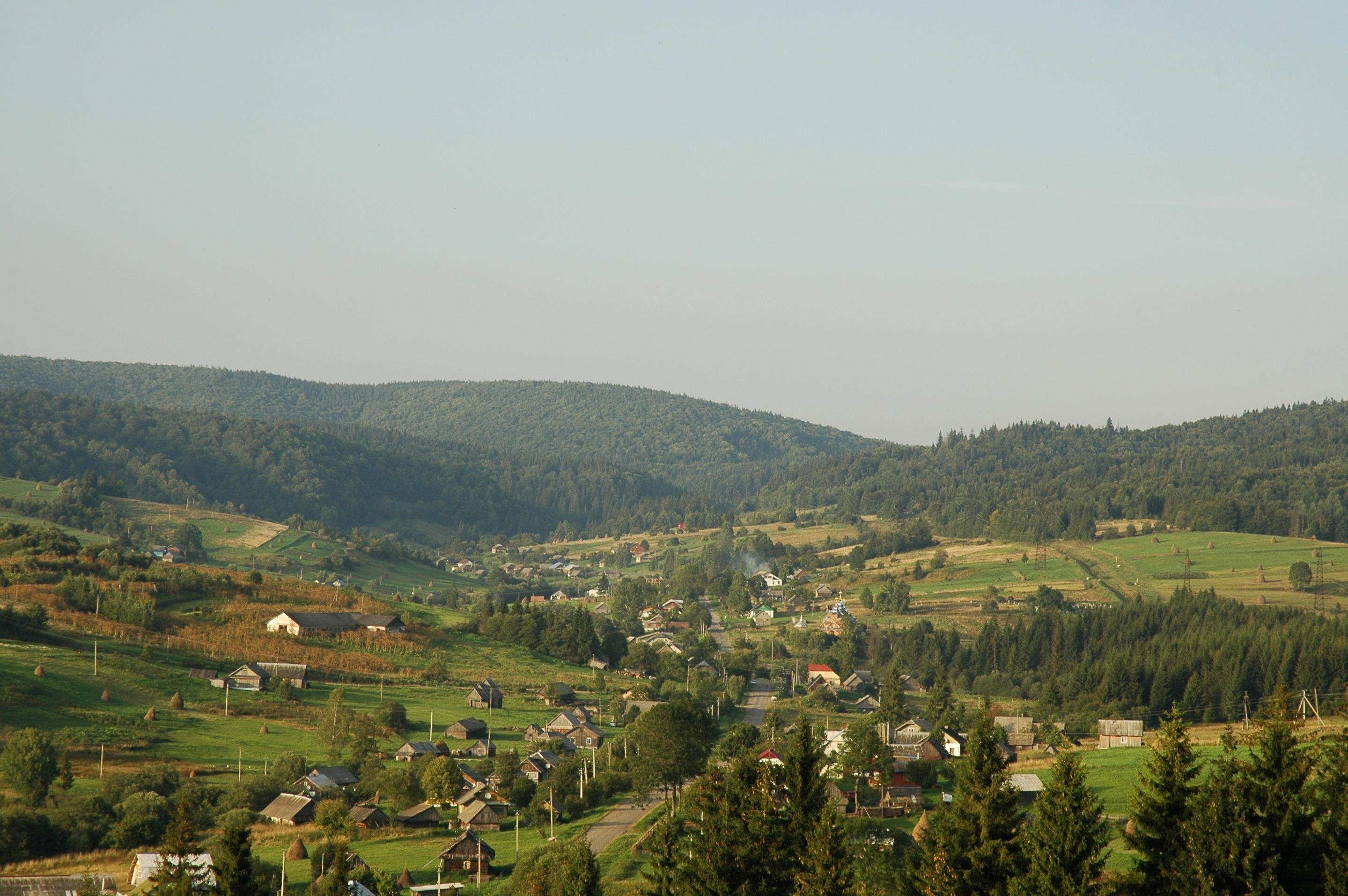
Panoramic view in 2011.

At the beginning of the 18th century, during the Austrian Empire (since 1867 Austria-Hungary), Skole District and other regions of the Austrian-held Carpathians began to colonize German craftsmen (see Galician Germans). This led to the development of industry and trade in land.

During the war, Klymets was situated at the border between Hungary and Ukraine. According to field research, approximately 12 Jews were murdered by the Germans in the summer of 1942.

Until 18 July 2020, Klymets belonged to Skole Raion. The raion was abolished in July 2020 as part of the administrative reform of Ukraine, which reduced the number of raions of Lviv Oblast to seven. The area of Skole Raion was merged into Stryi Raion.

== Literature ==
- Ukrainian: Історія міст і сіл УРСР : Львівська область. – К. : ГРУРЕ, 1968 р. Page 716.
