= Aleksandrowice, Bielsko-Biała =

Aleksandrowice
- Osiedle of Bielsko-Biała
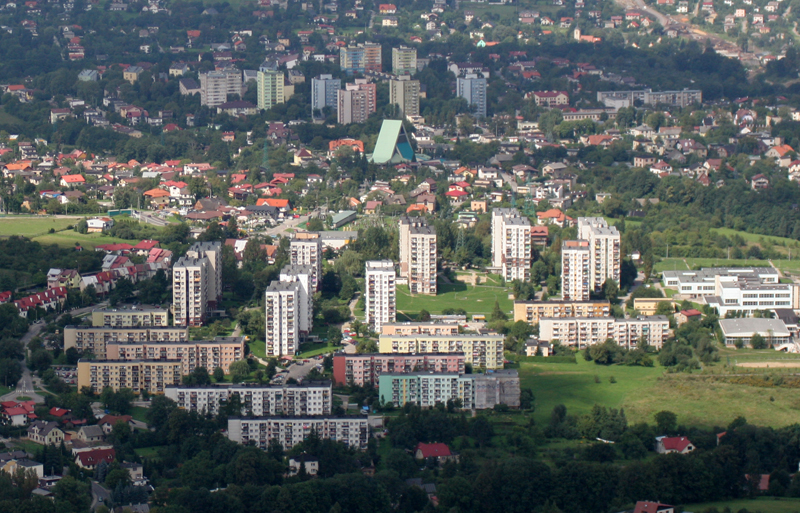
- Aerial view of Aleksandrowice

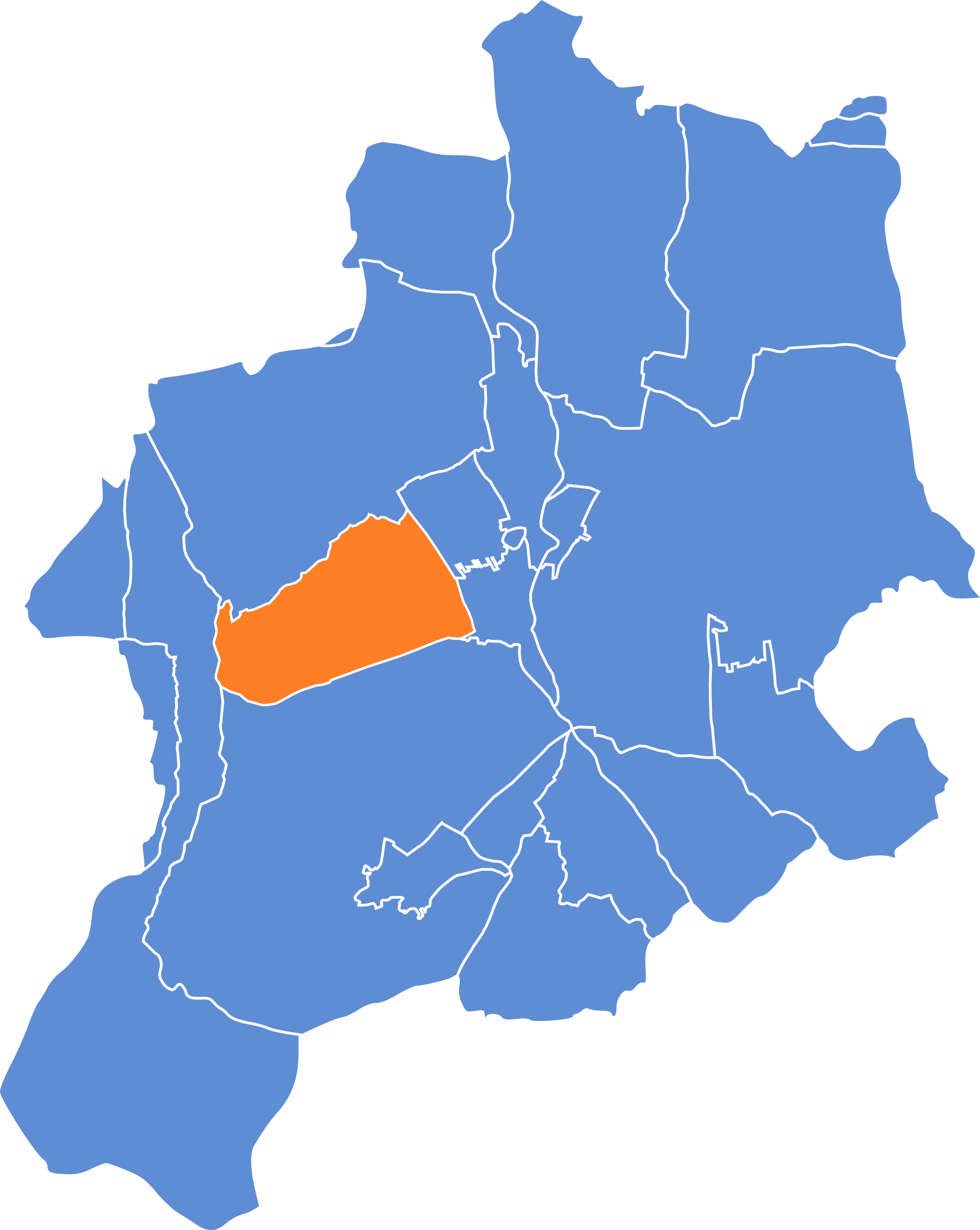
- Location of Aleksandrowice within Bielsko-Biała
- Coordinates: 49°48′52″N 19°14′00″E
- Country: Poland
- Voivodeship: Silesian
- County/City: Bielsko-Biała

Area
  - Total: 1.6988 km^{2} (0.6559 sq mi)

Population (2006)
  - Total: 1,821
  - Density: 1,072/km^{2} (2,776/sq mi)
- Time zone: UTC+1 (CET)
  - Summer (DST): UTC+2 (CEST)
- Area code: (+48) 033

Aleksandrowice (German: Alexanderfeld) is an osiedle (district) of Bielsko-Biała, Silesian Voivodeship, southern Poland. It is located in the central-west part of the city, in Silesian Foothills. The osiedle has an area of 1.6988 km^{2} and on December 31, 2006 had 1,821 inhabitants.

== History ==
The settlement arose after parcellation of a local folwark situated then in the southern part of Stare Bielsko which took place in years 1787–1790. It was later industrialized in part with a wider industrial growth of Bielsko and its surroundings. Politically it belonged then to the Duchy of Bielsko, within the Habsburg monarchy.

After the Revolutions of 1848 in the Austrian Empire a modern municipal division was introduced in the re-established Austrian Silesia. The village became a part of the municipality of Stare Bielsko that was subscribed to the political and legal district of Bielsko. It became a separate municipality in 1864.

According to the censuses conducted in 1880, 1890, 1900 and 1910 the population of the municipality grew from 1797 in 1880 to 2426 in 1910 with a majority being native German-speakers (between 77.3% and 87.3%) accompanied by a Polish-speaking minority (at most 22.1% in 1890) and a few Czech-speaking people (at most 12 or 0.6% in 1890), in terms of religion in 1910 majority were Protestants (50.4%), followed by Roman Catholics (47.5%), Jews (51 or 2.1%) and 2 persons adhering to yet another religion. It was then considered to be a part of a German language island around Bielsko (German: Bielitz-Bialaer Sprachinsel).

After World War I, fall of Austria-Hungary, Polish–Czechoslovak War and the division of Cieszyn Silesia in 1920, it became a part of Poland. It was then annexed by Nazi Germany at the beginning of World War II. After the war it was restored to Poland. The local German-speaking population fled or was expelled.

Aleksandrowice became administratively a part of Bielsko in 1938 (Bielsko-Biała since 1951).
