= Alzenau dialect =

East Central German dialect of Poland

Halcnovian
- Haltsnovian
- Aljznerisch
- Native to: Poland
- Region: Hałcnów, Silesian Voivodeship
- Native speakers: 8, including passive users (2015)
- Language family: Indo-European: Germanic; West Germanic; Elbe Germanic; (High German); Central German; East Central German; Schlesisch–Wilmesau; Bielsko-Biała; Halcnovian

Language codes
- ISO 639-3: –

Alzenau (endonym: Aljznerisch, Altsnerisch, Päurisch; German: Altsnerisch; Polish: etnolekt hałcnowski), also known as Halcnovian and Haltsnovian, is an East Central German dialect spoken in Hałcnów, formerly a village, and now part of the city Bielsko-Biała in Silesian Voivodeship, Poland. It was the vernacular language of Hałcnów until 1945, when ethnic Germans were expelled from Poland. Some examples of the language were recorded in the works of Karl Olma, who was active as a journalist in the Halcnovian exile community in West Germany after World War II. The dialect has been researched from a linguistic standpoint by Marek Dolatowski. In 2016 researchers traced a handful of native speakers of Halcnovian still resident in Hałcnów, and recorded them in order to help preserve the language. It belongs to the dialect group of the former Bielsko-Biała language island, which includes the Wymysorys language.

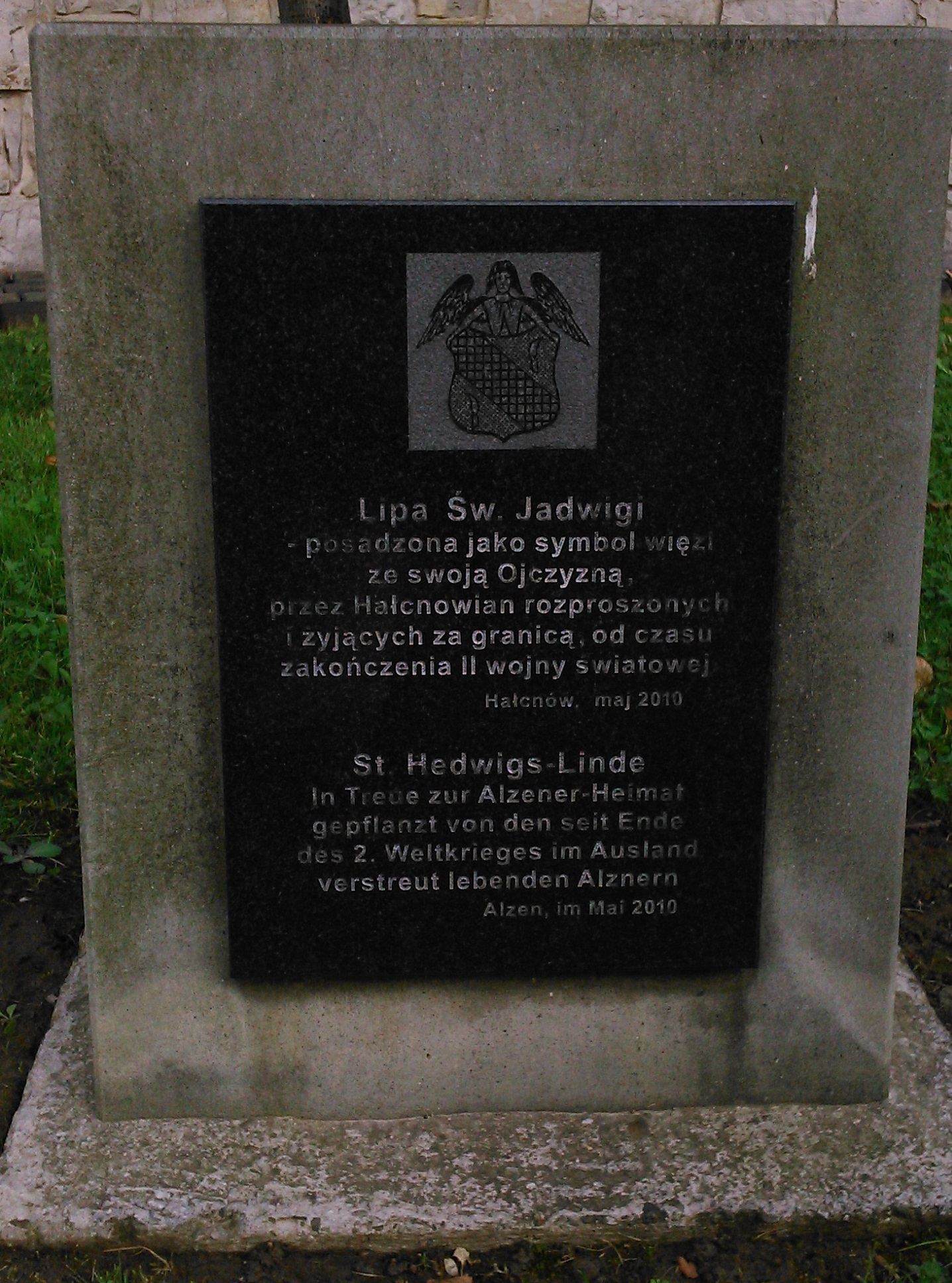
St. Hedwig linden tree in Hałcnów churchyard, commemorating inhabitants of the village expelled to Germany after 1945 (inscriptions in Polish and literary German)

== Sample text ==
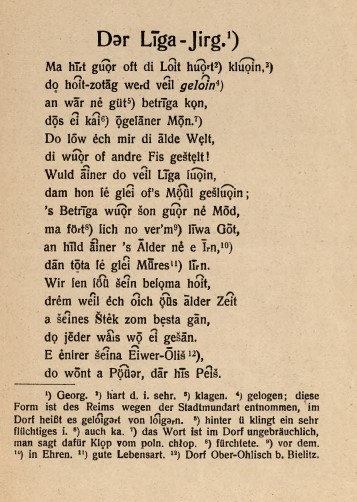
Dər Līga-Jirg.

Dər Līga-Jirg.

Ma hīrt guǫr oft di Loit huǫrt kluǫin
dǫ hoit-zotāg werd veil geloin
an wār nė güt betrīga kǫn,
dǭs ei kai ǭgeſāner Mǭn.
Do lōw ėch mir di ālde Węlt,
di wuǫr of andre Fis geštęlt!
[...]

Standard German translation:

Der Lügen Jürgen.

Man hört gar oft die Leute hart klagen,
Dass heutzutage wird viel gelogen.
Und wer nicht gut betrügen kann,
Der ist kein angesehener Mann.
Da lob ich mir die alte Welt,
Die war auf andere Füße gestellt.

== See also ==
- Wymysorys language
- Lower Silesian
- Silesian language
