= Karl Olma =

Halcnovian writer

- Päuesch Karl
- Born: June 24, 1914; Alza, Kingdom of Galicia and Lodomeria
- Died: February 23, 2001 (aged 86); Ingolstadt, Germany
- Other names: Michael Zöllner
- Occupation: Journalist
- Notable work: Pflüger im Nebel
- Parents: Johann (father); Marianna née Slosarczyk (mother)
- Awards: Order of Merit of the Federal Republic of Germany

Karl Olma (24 June 1914 – 23 February 2001), rendered Päuesch Karl in his native Halcnovian, was a writer, journalist, aphorist and poet. He is regarded as being the main writer responsible for promoting the Halcnovian dialect following World War II.

== Life ==
=== Early years ===
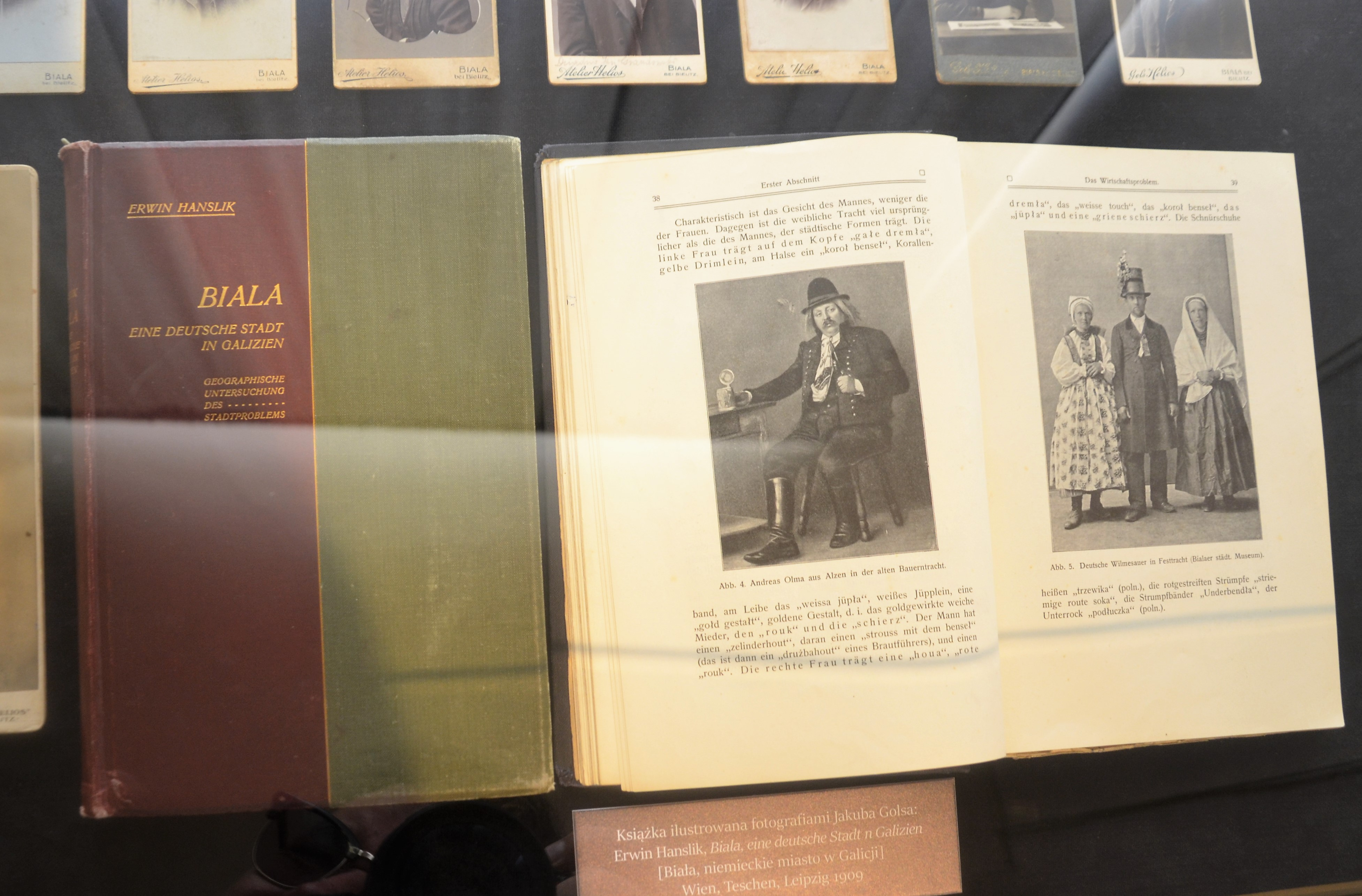
A member of the Olma family from Alza pictured seated (left), in an early twentieth-century book about Biała by the cultural historian Erwin Hanslik

Olma was born in the village of Alza, today a suburb of Bielsko-Biała known as Hałcnów, in what was then the Kingdom of Galicia and Lodomeria to ethnic Alznovian parents Johann and Marianna née Slosarczyk. After graduating from a school in Bielsko-Biała he found employment at the Schlesische Zeitung newspaper, and became involved with the Verband deutscher Katholikenan, an association representing the interests of Germans of Catholic faith. Due to his family's Alznovian ethnicity, at the end of WWII Olma was forced to emigrate from Alza while his parents, Johann and Marianna, were interned in a labour camp where they perished.

=== Emigration ===
After leaving Poland Olma settled in the American administered town of Ingolstadt, where he helped organise a group for expelled refugees from Alza. In 1960 he published his first novel Pfüger im Nebel, a semi-autobiographical story about a family from Alza. In the proceeding decades he authored many collections of stories and poems about Alza and its unique language. His work was published under the pen name of Michael Zöllner in order not to prejudice members of his family who remained in Hałcnów.

=== Death ===
Olma died in Ingolstadt on 23 February 2001.

== Work ==
Olma is the only known speaker of the Halcnovian dialect to have used the language in a literary capacity. Among his works, he produced compilations of Halcnovian folk songs and poems, a local chronicle, and the novel Pflüger im Nebel, considered his magnum opus. Other works by Olma include the collection of Halcovnian poetry and song ALZA - wu de Putter wuor gesalza (1988), the historical book Heimat Alzen. Versuch einer Chronik (1983) in which he described the shelling of Hałcnów's church by the Red Army, and the collection of short stories In den Fängen der „Eule“ und andere Erzählungen aus Oberschlesien (1991).
