= Komorowice, Bielsko-Biała =

Komorowice
- District of Bielsko-Biała
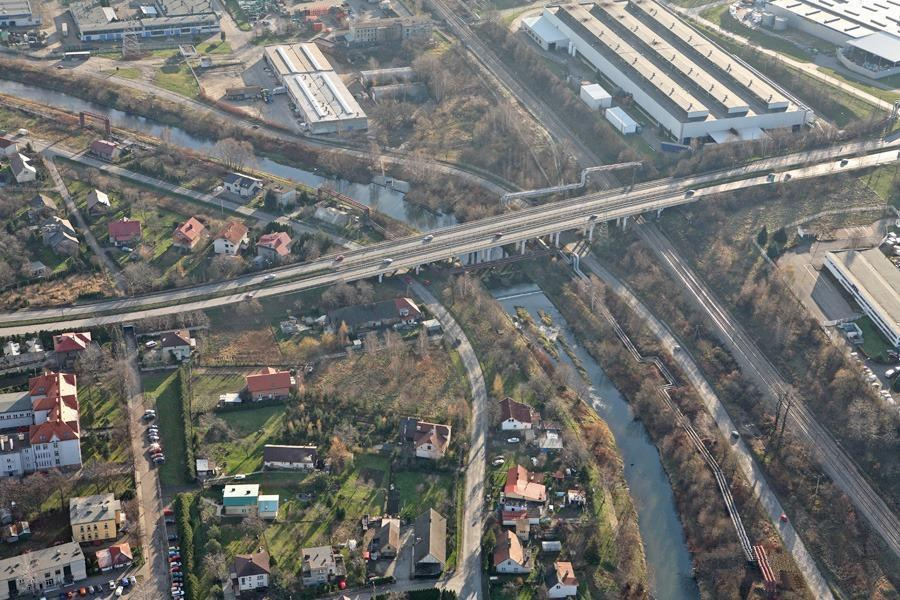
- Biała River in the southern part of Komorowice

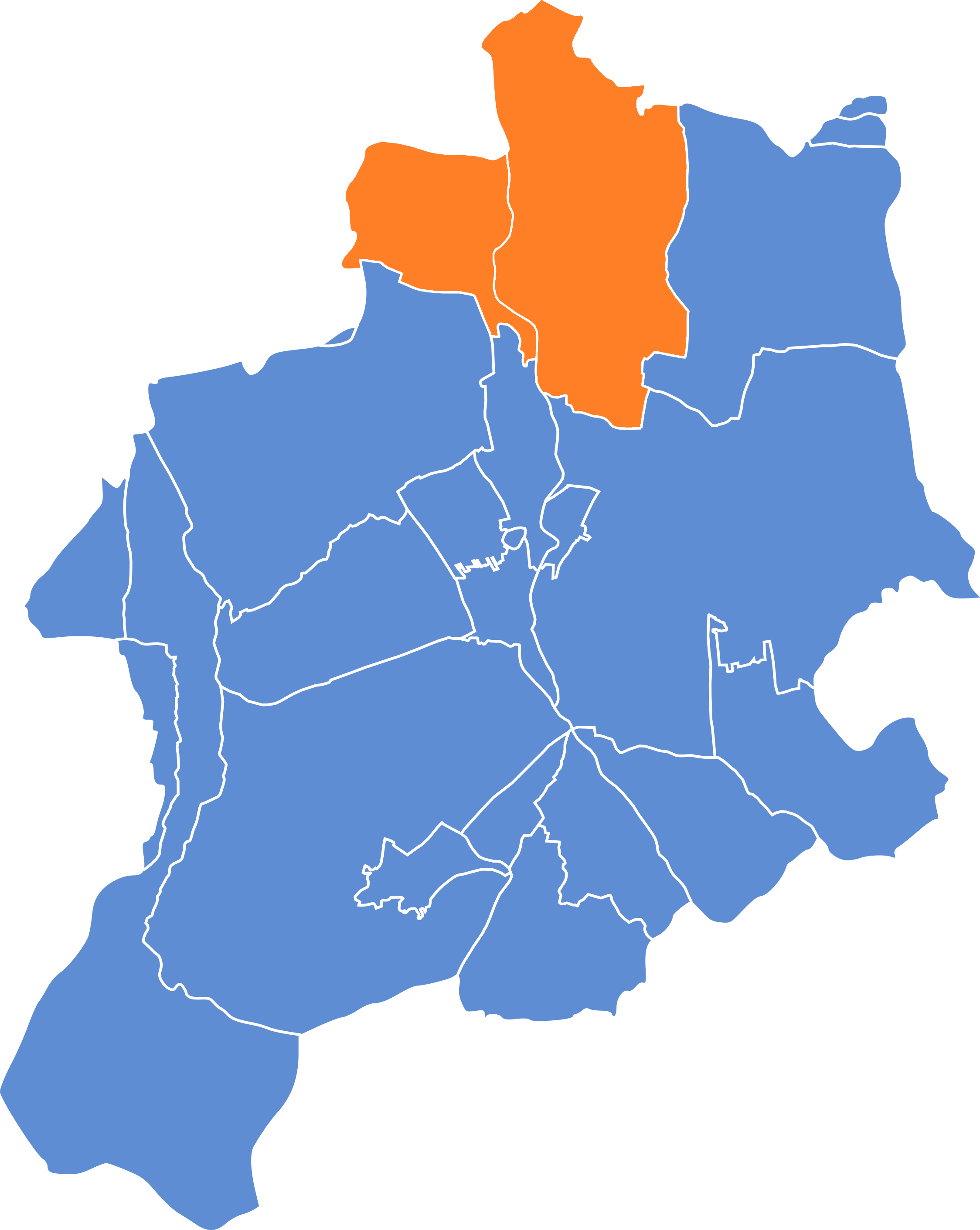
- Location of Komorowice within Bielsko-Biała
- Coordinates: 49°51′16″N 19°2′26″E
- Country: Poland
- Voivodeship: Silesian
- County/City: Bielsko-Biała

Area
  - Total: 15.3117 km^{2} (5.9119 sq mi)

Population (2006)
  - Total: 10,112
  - Density: 660.41/km^{2} (1,710.5/sq mi)
- Time zone: UTC+1 (CET)
  - Summer (DST): UTC+2 (CEST)
- Area code: (+48) 033

Komorowice (German: Batzdorf; Silesian: Kõmorowice) is the northernmost part of Bielsko-Biała, Silesian Voivodeship, southern Poland. It is located on both banks of the Biała River, the historical border river between Silesia and Lesser Poland, and from the mid-15th century to 1772, also the states of Poland and Bohemia (from 1526 part of the Habsburg monarchy).

Komorowice is an informal dzielnica (a form of district). Since 2002 it consists of two osiedla (auxiliary units, Polish: jednostki pomocnicze), which have a combined area of 15.3117 km^{2} (Komorowice Krakowskie: 9.6152 km^{2}, Komorowice Śląskie: 5.6995 km^{2}) and on December 31, 2006 had altogether 10,112 inhabitants (7,778 in Komorowice Krakowskie, 2,334 in Komorowice Śląskie).

The name of the village is derived from personal name Komor locally meaning also a mosquito (Polish: komar, German: Mücke, hence Mückendorf).

== History ==
The village was established in the late 13th century as part of a larger settlement campaign taking place on the territory of what would later be known as Upper Silesia. Actually two settlements were established. Both were first mentioned in a Latin document of Diocese of Wrocław called Liber fundationis episcopatus Vratislaviensis from around 1305 as item in Bertoltowitz and item in Muthindorf. It meant that the villages were still in the early process of location (the size of land to pay a tithe from was not yet precise). They were both located on the Biała River, with Bertoltowitz in the south and Muthindorf in the north. Muthindorf (-dorf meaning a village in German) was undoubtedly settled by Germans, whereas in case of Bertoltowitz an ethnic German named Bertold was either its founder or the first owner, but the majority of denizens of the village were of Polish (Slavic) origin, as a typical Slavic ending -itz (later -ice) was used in the name of the settlement. In 1314 or 1315 in the process of feudal fragmentation of Poland the Duchy of Oświęcim was split from the Duchy of Teschen with the new border running along Biała River and cutting through the villages, dividing them into two parts.

=== Komorowice Krakowskie ===
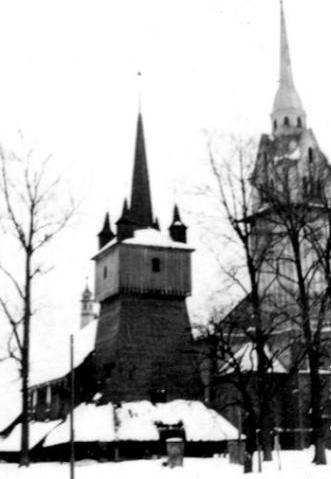
Churches, old and new, in Komorowice Krakowskie (1930s)

The parts of the villages on the right bank of the Biała river became a part of the Duchy of Oświęcim, which in 1327 became a fee of the Kingdom of Bohemia. The local church was first mentioned in the register of Peter's Pence payment among Catholic parishes of Oświęcim deaconry of the Diocese of Kraków as villa Bertholdi.

In 1457 Jan IV of Oświęcim agreed to sell the duchy to the Polish Crown, and in the accompanying document issued on 21 February the villages were mentioned as Byertholtowicze and Komorowicze. The territory of the Duchy of Oświęcim was eventually incorporated into Poland in 1564 and formed Silesian County of Kraków Voivodeship. Later on Komorowicze (Komorowice) absorbed Byertholtowicze (Bierułtowice). In order to differentiate it from the Silesian counterpart across Biała River, which since then constituted a state border, they were dubbed as Polskie (Polish).

Upon the First Partition of Poland in 1772 it became part of the Austrian Kingdom of Galicia. According to the Austrian census of 1900 the village had 2737 inhabitants living in 231 houses. The census asked people their native language, and results show that 2615 (95.5%) were Polish-speaking, 110 (4%) were German-speaking and 1 used another language. The dominant religious group was Roman Catholicism with 2661 (97.2%), followed by Jews with 73 (2.7%) and 3 adherents of another religion. After World War I and fall of Austria-Hungary in 1918 it became part of Poland.

=== Komorowice Śląskie ===
The part of the villages on the left bank of the Biała continued to be a part of the Duchy of Teschen, which like the Duchy of Oświęcim in 1327 also became a fee of the Kingdom of Bohemia. However, when the Duchy of Oświęcim became a part of Poland in the 1450s, the Duchy of Teschen continued to be a part of the Kingdom of Bohemia, which itself became a part of the Habsburg monarchy in 1526.

The name Muthindorf from 1305 evolved through Mickendorff (1566), Mukendorf P. Komorowice (1736), Mückendorf (1900) into Komorowice Czechowskie (1921) and as such were absorbed earlier by a nearby Czechowice.

Bertoltowitz was mentioned as Biertoltowicze in 1563 and as Betzdorf in 1566. The name Betzdorf indicates that in the meantime a German population settled in the village. Later on the village was also being mentioned as Komorowice with a slightly varying spelling. In 1572 they were sold together with Bielsko and dozen surrounding villages by dukes of Teschen to form Bielsko state country (since 1754 a duchy). In the 19th century it was mostly known as Batzdorf, and in order to differentiate the village from the Lesser Polish counterpart across Biała River, it was also dubbed as Niemieckie (German) or Śląskie (Silesian).

After the Revolutions of 1848 in the Austrian Empire a modern municipal division was introduced in the re-established Austrian Silesia. The village as a municipality was subscribed to the political and legal district of Bielsko. According to the censuses conducted in 1880, 1890, 1900 and 1910 the population of the municipality grew from 375 in 1880 to 656 in 1910 with an ethnically mixed population. German language was declared to be spoken at home by the majority of citizens in 1880 (201 or 54%) and 1910 (494 or 75.5%), whereas Polish-speakers were in majority in 1890 (225 or 50.9%) and 1900 (262 or 50.4%), in 1900 there were also 7 (1.6%) Czech-speaking persons. In terms of religion the majority were Roman Catholics (272 or 51.7% in 1900, 460 or 70.1% in 1910), followed by Protestants (249 or 47.3% in 1900, 195 or 29.8%) and Jews (5 people in 1900). It was then considered to be a part of a German language island around Bielsko (German: Bielitz-Bialaer Sprachinsel).

=== After World War I ===
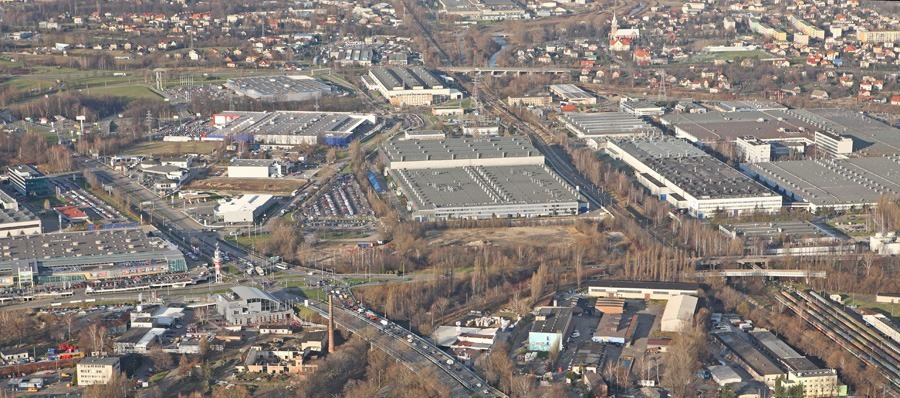
FIAT manufacture in Komorowice

In 1920, after the division of Cieszyn Silesia Komorowice Niemieckie also became a part of Poland. The supplementary adjectives in the names of the villages changed, from Komorowice Polskie (Polish) into Komorowice Krakowskie (Cracovian) and Komorowice Niemieckie (German) into Komorowice Śląskie (Silesian). In the interwar period Komorowice were industrialized, the biggest factory opened at that the time was the one producing matches. They were annexed by Nazi Germany at the beginning of World War II. The villages were administratively merged in 1955. In the 1970s Fabryka Samochodów Małolitrażowych, commonly known as FSM, was built in the southern part of the municipality. Komorowice became a part of Bielsko-Biała in 1977.
