= Stare Bielsko =

- Osiedle of Bielsko-Biała
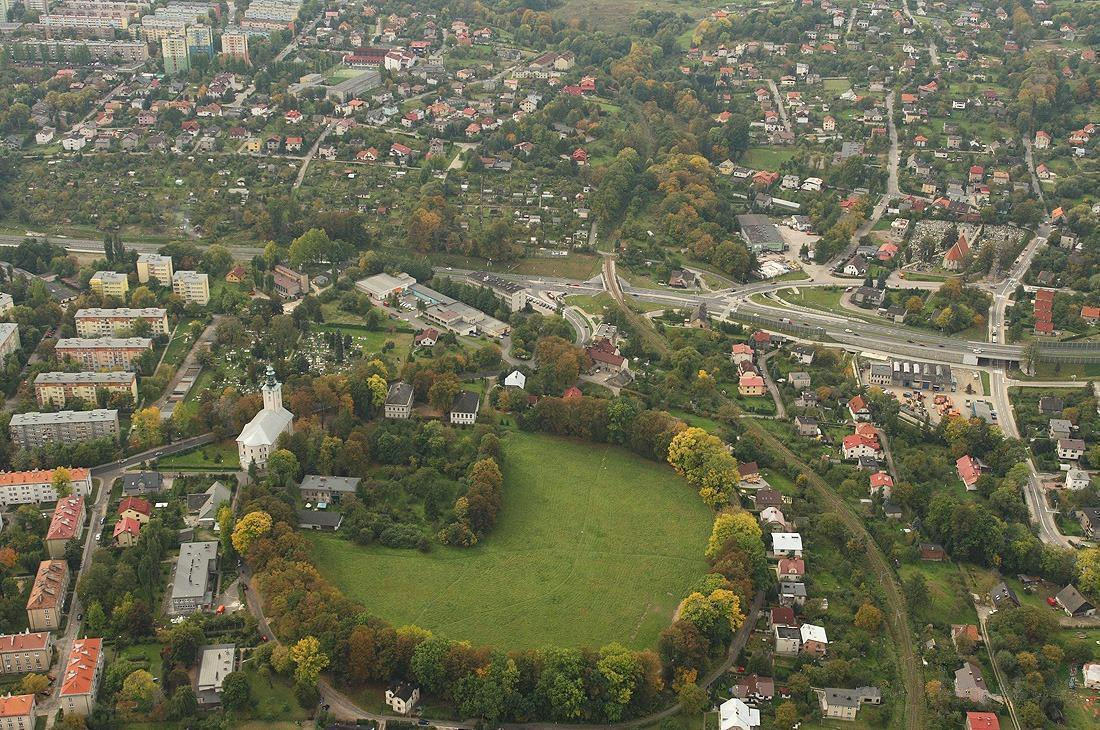
- Gord in Stare Bielsko from above

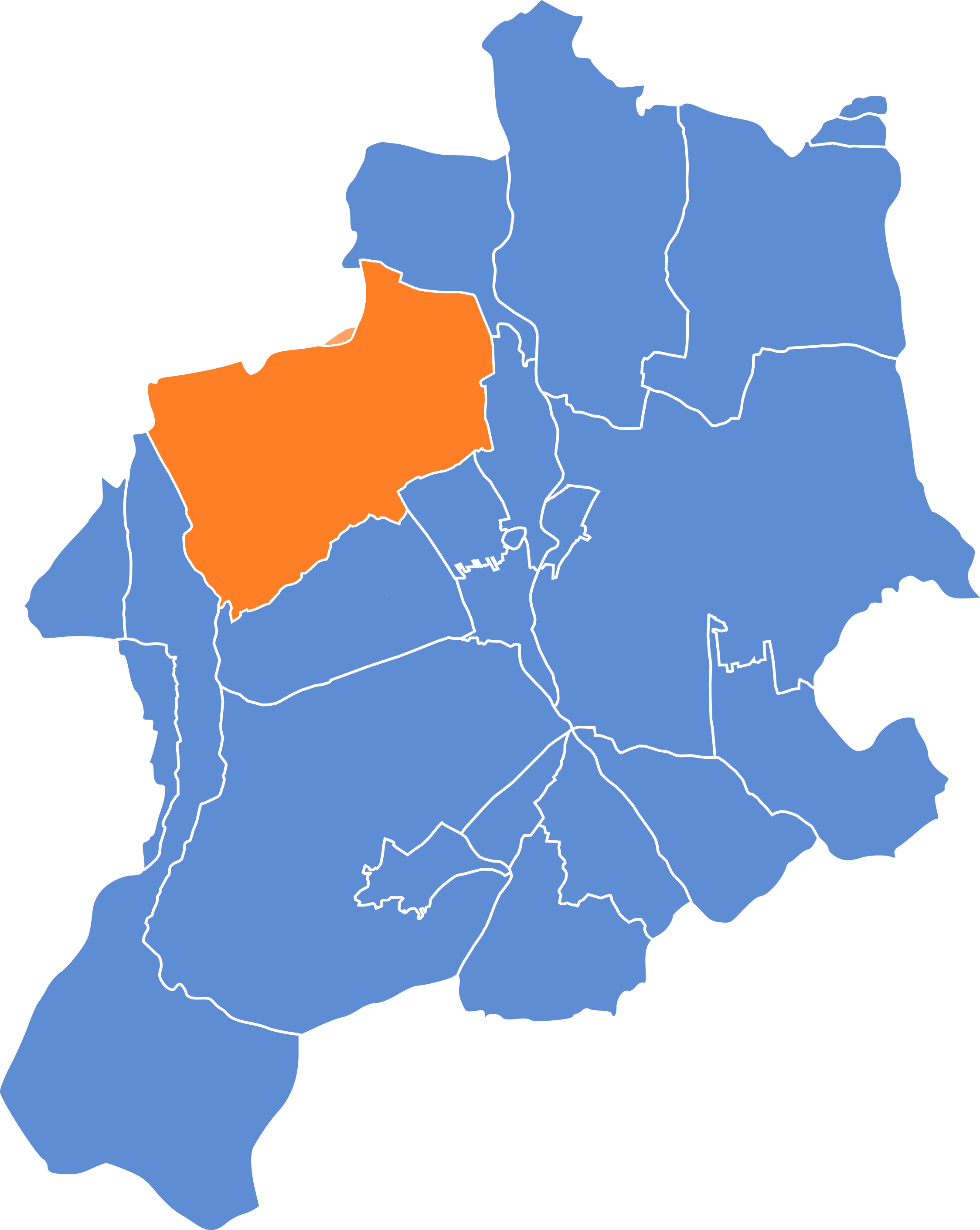
- Location of Stare Bielsko within Bielsko-Biała
- Coordinates: 49°49′25.5″N 19°01′04″E
- Country: Poland
- Voivodeship: Silesian
- County/City: Bielsko-Biała

Area
  - Total: 11.118 km^{2} (4.293 sq mi)

Population (2006)
  - Total: 5,817
  - Density: 523.2/km^{2} (1,355/sq mi)
- Time zone: UTC+1 (CET)
  - Summer (DST): UTC+2 (CEST)
- Area code: (+48) 033
- Website: starebielsko.um.bielsko.pl

Stare Bielsko (German: Alt Bielitz, both literally meaning "Old Bielsko/Bielitz" Silesian: Stary Biylsko) is an osiedle (district) of Bielsko-Biała, Silesian Voivodeship, southern Poland. It is located in the west-north part of the city, in Silesian Foothills. Osiedle has an area of 11.118 km^{2} and on December 31, 2006, had 5,817 inhabitants.

== History ==
The first settlement in the area arose in 12th century and was destroyed around the year 1400. In parallel evolved a village Bielsko, that later was a ground for the foundation of town Bielsko by the first prince of the Duchy of Teschen, Mieszko. The village was later first mentioned in a written document as Alte Belicz (pl. Stare Bielsko) in 1452. In 1572 it was sold together with Bielsko and dozen surrounding villages by dukes of Cieszyn and split from their duchy to form Bielsko state country (since 1754 Duchy of Bielsko).

After the 1540s Reformation prevailed in the Duchy of Teschen and a local Catholic church was taken over by Lutherans. It was taken from them, as one from around fifty buildings in the region, by a special commission and given back to the Roman Catholic Church on 16 April 1654.

In 1848 in the south-west part of Stare Bielsko a new village was extracted: Aleksandrowice.

After the Revolutions of 1848 in the Austrian Empire a modern municipal division was introduced in the re-established Austrian Silesia. The village as a municipality was subscribed to the political and legal district of Bielsko. According to the censuses conducted in 1880, 1890, 1900 and 1910 the population of the municipality grew from 2310 in 1880 to 2899 in 1910 with a majority being native German-speakers (between 84.7% and 91.9%) accompanied by a Polish-speaking minority (at most 15.3% in 1900) and a few Czech-speaking people (at most 5 or 0.2% in 1900 and 1910), in terms of religion in 1910 majority were Protestants (64.2%), followed by Roman Catholics (34.1%), Jews (42 or 1.4%) and 8 persons adhering to yet another religion. It was then considered to be a part of a German language island around Bielsko (German: Bielitz-Bialaer Sprachinsel).

After World War I, fall of Austria-Hungary, Polish–Czechoslovak War and the division of Cieszyn Silesia in 1920, it became a part of Poland. It was then annexed by Nazi Germany at the beginning of World War II. After the war it was restored to Poland. The local German-speaking population fled or was expelled.

Stare Bielsko became administratively a part of Bielsko-Biała in 1977.

== Sights ==
There is a gothic Saint Stanislaus church in the district, dating from the 12th century, the oldest sacral building in the city. The second temple in Stare Bielsko is the Lutheran John the Baptist church from 1818.
