= Wacław Chamrat =

Polish lawyer and notary (1735–1813)

Wacław Chamrat (German: Wenzel Chamrath) (c. 1735 – 14 October 1813 in Biała) was a lawyer, notary and chronicler. He was an author of the Kronika miasta Białej (Chronicle of Biała), which is considered as a priceless source for the history of Biała in the 18th century.

The Kronika miasta Biała was copied in 1845 by Karol Tschickardt, who removed the introduction about Polish history of Silesia, Bielsko and Biała.

Chamrat's chronicle was published for the first time in 1983.
