= Wapienica, Bielsko-Biała =

Wapienica
- Osiedle of Bielsko-Biała
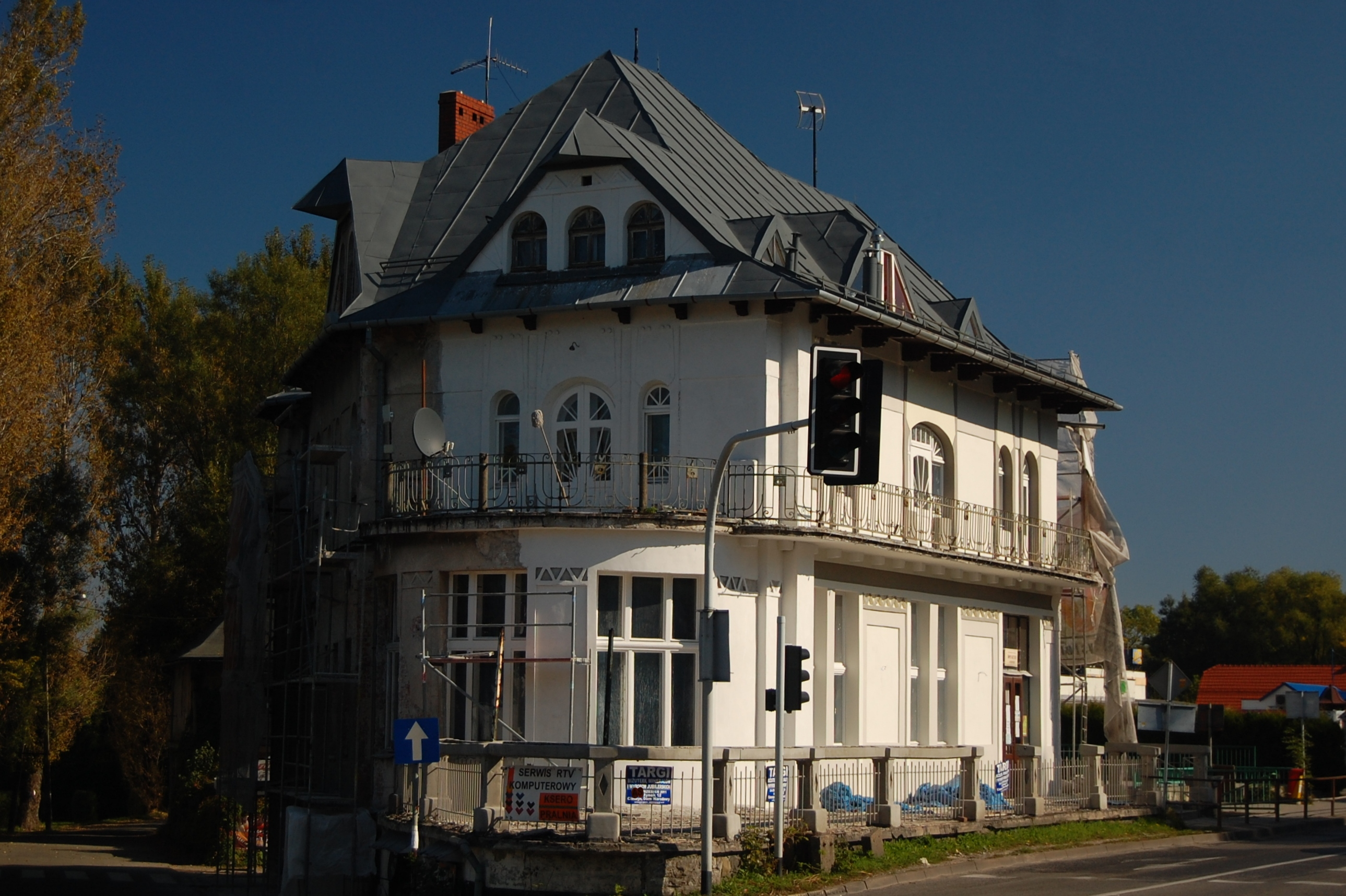
- Cultural centre

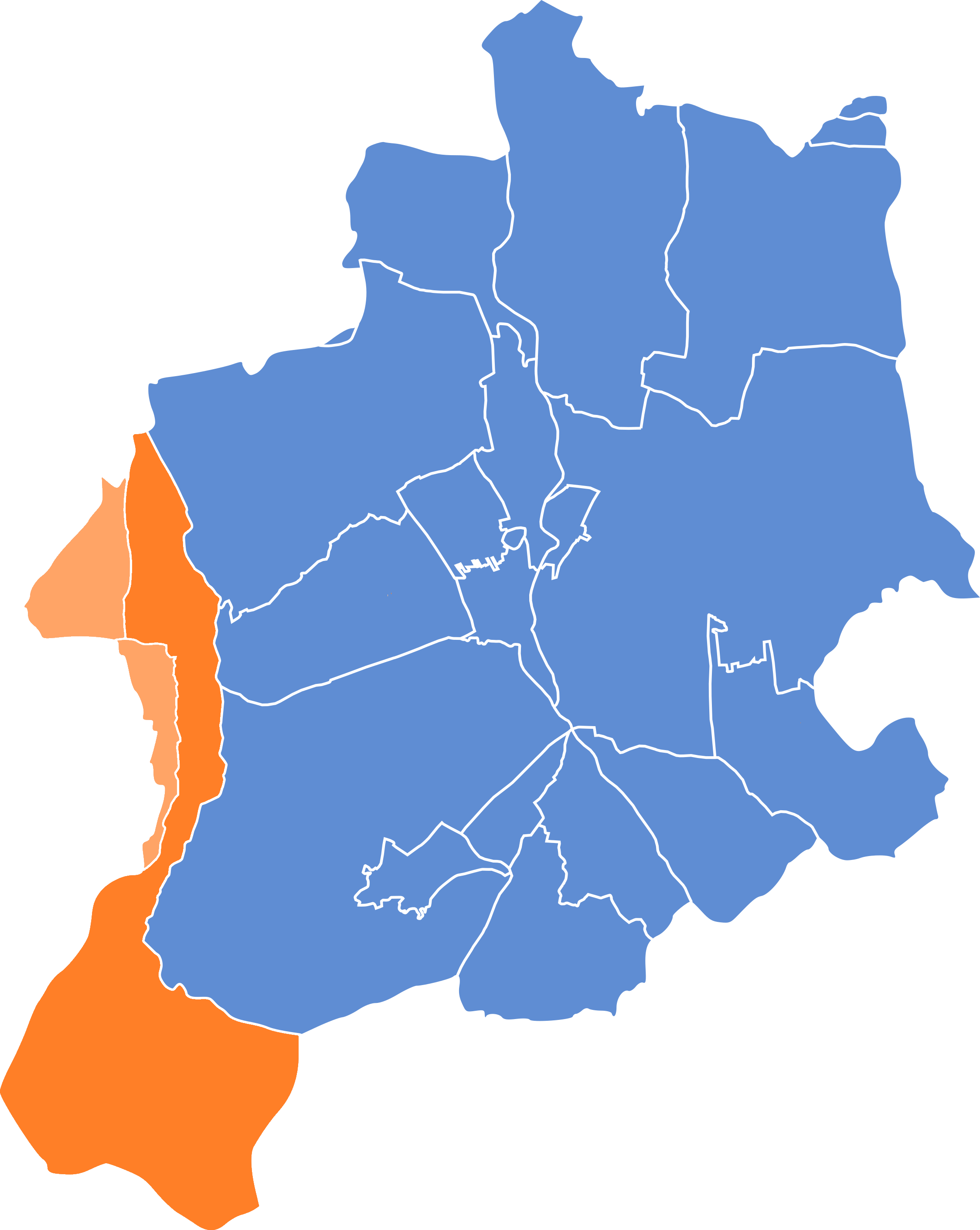
- Location of Wapienica within Bielsko-Biała
- Coordinates: 49°48′30″N 18°59′02″E
- Country: Poland
- Voivodeship: Silesian
- County/City: Bielsko-Biała

Area
  - Total: 25.8856 km^{2} (9.9945 sq mi)

Population (2006)
  - Total: 10,439
  - Density: 403.27/km^{2} (1,044.5/sq mi)
- Time zone: UTC+1 (CET)
  - Summer (DST): UTC+2 (CEST)
- Area code: (+48) 033

Wapienica (German: Lobnitz; Silesian: Wapienika) is an osiedle (district) of Bielsko-Biała, Silesian Voivodeship, southern Poland. The osiedle has an area of 25.8856 km^{2} and on December 31, 2006, had 10,439 inhabitants.

It is located in the western part of the city, alongside Wapienica river.

== History ==
The village was established in the middle of the 16th century and was first mentioned in 1571 as Lopnitz. The village was most probably established be German settlers but they borrowed the name of the settlement from the Slavic name of the local stream Łopienica.

Politically it belonged initially to the Duchy of Teschen, a fee of the Kingdom of Bohemia and also a part of the Habsburg monarchy. Soon after in 1572 it became a part of the Bielsko state country (since 1754 a duchy). In the 19th century it was partially industrialized due to its proximity to Bielsko.

After the Revolutions of 1848 in the Austrian Empire a modern municipal division was introduced in the re-established Austrian Silesia. The village as a municipality was subscribed to the political and legal district of Bielsko. According to the censuses conducted in 1880, 1890, 1900 and 1910 the population of the municipality grew from 792 in 1880 to 823 in 1910 with a majority being native German-speakers (at most 90.2% in 1880, at least 66.1% in 1890) accompanied by a Polish-speaking minority (at least 9.7% in 1880, at most 33.8% in 1890). In terms of religion in 1910 majority were Protestants (63.7%), followed by Roman Catholics (34.3%) and Jews (7 people), additional 10 people adhered to yet another faiths. It was then considered to be a part of a German language island around Bielsko (German: Bielitz-Bialaer Sprachinsel).

After World War I, fall of Austria-Hungary, Polish–Czechoslovak War and the division of Cieszyn Silesia in 1920, it became a part of Poland. It was then annexed by Nazi Germany at the beginning of World War II. After the war it was restored to Poland. The local German-speaking population fled or was expelled.

Wapienica became administratively a part of Bielsko-Biała in 1977.
