= Hałcnów =

Hałcnów Alza
- Osiedle
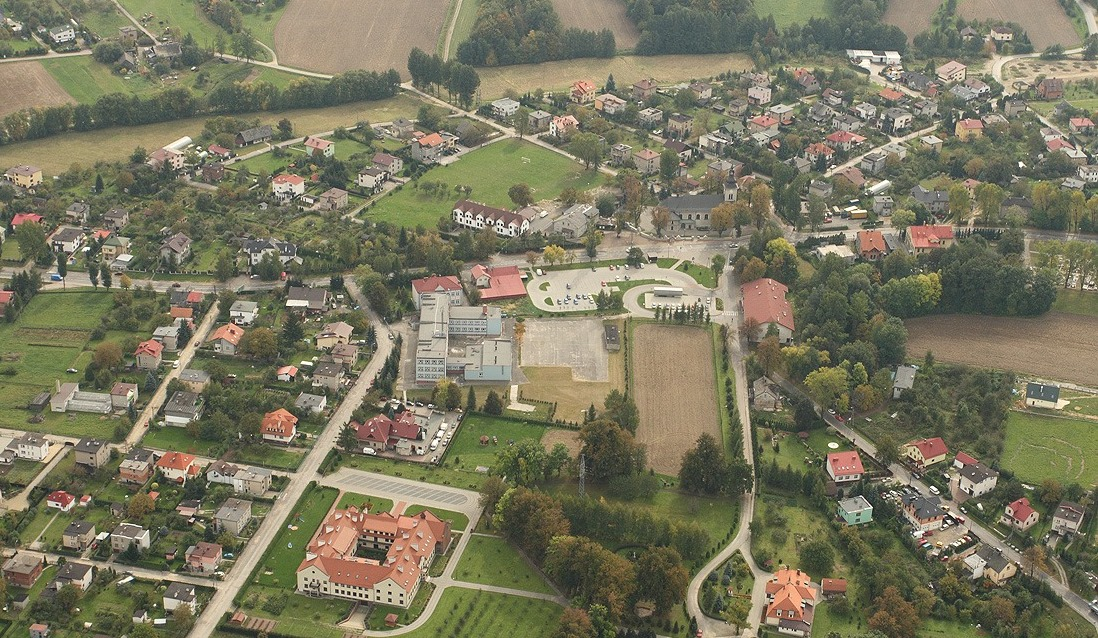
- Aerial view of Hałcnów

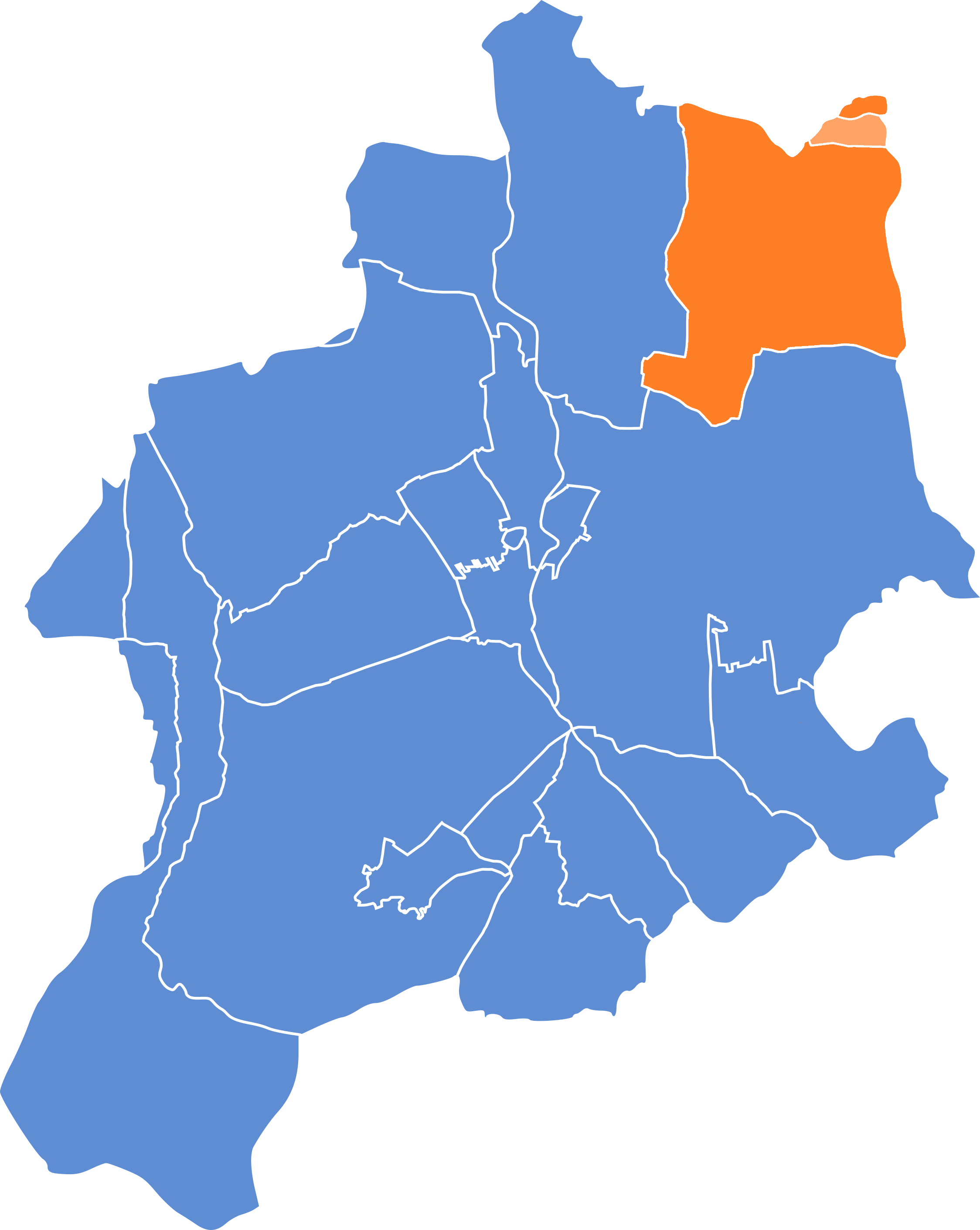
- Location of Hałcnów within Bielsko-Biała
- Coordinates: 49°50′59″N 19°05′31″E
- Country: Poland
- Voivodeship: Silesian
- City county: Bielsko-Biała

Area
  - Total: 13.5091 km^{2} (5.2159 sq mi)

Population (2006)
  - Total: 7,747
  - Density: 573.5/km^{2} (1,485/sq mi)
- Time zone: UTC+1 (CET)
  - Summer (DST): UTC+2 (CEST)
- Area code: (+48) 033

Hałcnów (Alzenau: Alza) is an osiedle of Bielsko-Biała, Silesian Voivodeship, southern Poland. It is located in the north-east part of the city. It was a separate municipality, but was merged into Bielsko-Biała in 1977. The osiedle has an area of 13.5091 km^{2} and on December 31, 2006 had 7,747 inhabitants.

== History ==
The village was first mentioned in 1404. Politically the village belonged then to the Duchy of Oświęcim, a fee of the Kingdom of Bohemia. In 1457 Jan IV of Oświęcim agreed to sell the duchy to the Polish Crown, and in the accompanying document issued on 21 February the village was mentioned as Halcznow. This name derives from a Polonization of the original German name Alzen or Alzenau. The territory of the Duchy of Oświęcim was eventually incorporated into Poland in 1564 and formed Silesian County of Kraków Voivodeship.

Upon the First Partition of Poland in 1772 it became part of the Austrian Kingdom of Galicia. The town was a part of a German language island around Bielsko (German: Bielitz-Bialaer Sprachinsel). In 1786 the village became a seat of a Catholic parish.

According to the Austrian census of 1900 the village had 2669 inhabitants living in 288 houses. The census asked people their native language, and results show that 1986 (74,4%) were German-speaking and 678 (25,4%) were Polish-speaking. The dominant religious groups were Roman Catholics with 2652 (99,4%), 11 (0,4%) Jews and 6 persons were adherents of another religion. A specific Germanic ethnolect was also spoken here.

After World War I and fall of Austria-Hungary it became part of Poland. It was annexed by Nazi Germany at the beginning of World War II, and afterwards it was restored to Poland. The local German-speaking population was expelled.

== Notable people ==
- Karl Olma

== See also ==
- Alzenau dialect
