= Smozhe =

Village in Lviv Oblast, Ukraine

- Village
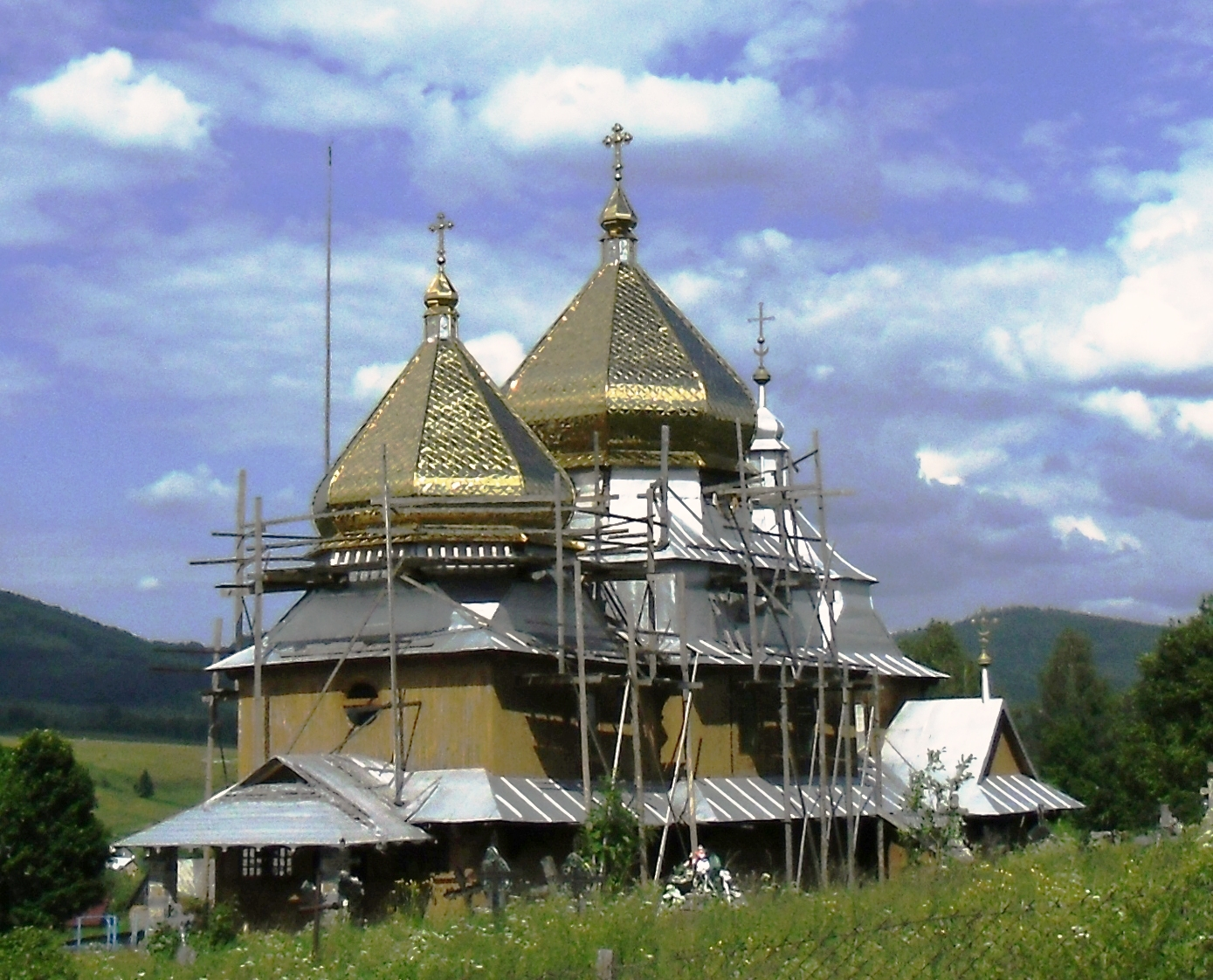
- Church of St. Michael

- Coat of arms

- Location within Lviv Oblast
- Coordinates: 48°54′29″N 23°11′31″E
- Country: Ukraine
- Oblast: Lviv Oblast
- Raion: Stryi Raion
- Hromada: Kozova rural hromada
- Area: 219 km^{2} (85 sq mi)
- Elevation: 655 m (2,149 ft)
- Population: 955
  - Density: 29,909/km^{2} (77,460/sq mi)
- Website: село Сможе _{(Ukrainian)}

Smozhe (Ukrainian: Сможе; Polish: Smorze) is a village (selo) in Stryi Raion, Lviv Oblast, in Western Ukraine. Smozhe is located in the Ukrainian Carpathians, within the limits of the Eastern Beskids (Skole Beskids) in southern part of the oblast. It belongs to Kozova rural hromada, one of the hromadas of Ukraine. The local government was the Smozhe Village Council prior to its abolishment as part of the 2020 administrative reform.

== Geography ==
The village is located along the highway road Highway M06 (Ukraine) ( M 06), on the southern slopes of the ridge Dovzhky (998 – 1056 m). It is 146 kilometres (91 mi) from the city of Lviv, 37 kilometres (23 mi) from Skole, and 123 kilometres (76 mi) from Uzhhorod.
This village is located on the altitude of 845 metres (2,770 ft) above sea level, which forms here the mountain climate.

== History ==
The first written mention of which dates from the year 1553. Later, King Augustus III created the town, giving him October 24, 1760 Magdeburg rights and emblem. In the Geographical Dictionary of the Kingdom of Poland in volume X (released in 1889) description of Smozhe occupies three pages. Smozhe was a town with a town hall, several shops and artisan workshops.

Until 18 July 2020, Smozhe belonged to Skole Raion. The raion was abolished in July 2020 as part of the administrative reform of Ukraine, which reduced the number of raions of Lviv Oblast to seven. The area of Skole Raion was merged into Stryi Raion.

== Sights ==
The wooden Church of St. Michael built in 1874 has been preserved in Smozhe. The church is under protection of the state together with the bell tower located next to it.

== Literature ==
- Ukrainian: Історія міст і сіл УРСР : Львівська область. – К. : ГРУРЕ, 1968 р.
