= Language island =

Enclave of a language

A language island (a calque of German Sprachinsel), also known as a language enclave or language pocket, is an enclave of a language that is surrounded by one or more different languages. The term was introduced in 1847. Many speakers of these languages also have their own distinct culture.

Language islands often form as a result of migration, colonization, imperialism, or trade without a common tongue. Language islands are common of indigenous peoples, especially in the Americas, where colonization has led them to isolate themselves greatly.

Language islands often overlap others. For example, in Brussels, a Belgian language island, most of the population is fluent in both Flemish and French, and is still considered a language island or enclave; yet, some consider Brussels' Flemish and Brussels' French to be of separate islands, despite them generally being the same people.

== Examples of language islands ==
=== Alguerese ===
Alguerese is a variety of Catalan spoken in Alghero, Sardinia, Italy, with around 45,000 speakers. It is mutually intelligible with Catalan, and although both Standard Catalan and Alguerese have been influenced by Italian and Spanish, Alguerese has experienced a much closer relationship between the two.

Initially, Alguerese held sway as the dominant language in the region until Spanish took over. However, in the mid-eighteenth century, Italian supplanted Spanish, becoming the new official language. Notwithstanding, the Alguerese influence persevered, and today the language enjoys a form of semi-official status alongside Italian.

=== Arbëresh ===
Arbëresh is the language of the Arbëreshë people, an originally Albanian ethnolinguistic group of Italy, mainly concentrated in Southern Italy with around 100,000 speakers. Many Arbëreshë people also speak Italian, and thus Arbëresh has been affected greatly by it.

The first Arbëreshë who settled in Italy did so mainly because of their severe mistreatment in what was then the Ottoman Balkans, but even so they had been subjugated further in Italy; Pier Paolo Pasolini called their continued and prospering existence there an "anthropological miracle." It took very long for them to be granted equal rights, and longer yet for the general public to accept them as one of their own.

=== Betawi ===
Betawi is the native language of the Betawi people, which are concentrated in Greater Jakarta, with an uncertain population, with certain estimates saying 600,000—5,000,000.

Due to social stratification, Betawi is often imitated by celebrities and youth, making it a core part of popular culture in the area and across indonesia.

=== Khalaj ===
Khalaj is the language of the Khalaj people in Iran. Despite having disputed Turkic origins, it also has much in common with Persian and sometimes Arabic.

It has been described as an extremely endangered language, and is not often passed down to younger generations. Its current population is ambiguous, but it is widely understood that it is rapidly decreasing, due to the greater practicality of using Persian.

=== Italiot Greek ===
Italiot Greek is a variety of Modern Greek spoken in southern Italy. It is split into two dialects, Calabrian Greek and Griko, with a total of around 2000 speakers. Almost all of its speakers are bilingual in both Italian and Griko.

=== Sorbian ===
Sorbian is a dialect continuum spoken in two provinces of Germany, namely Saxony (Upper Lusatia) and Brandenburg (Lower Lusatia).

The Sorbs of Germany have had a similar history to the Jews of Germany, in that they were both oppressed by the federal and state governments (particularly by federal), they were both dismissed minorities in favor of the German population, and were unfairly categorized and separated by region, age, generation. A notable difference between the two however, was that Jews had often fought to be represented with little prevail at the time, whereas although several programmes had been implemented to preserve the Sorbian languages and cultures, Sorbs often and still do reject West Slavic culture to blend in with the German surrounding. Granata, C. A. (n.d.). Celebration and suspicion:

The Sorbian languages are a language family of West Slavic languages spoken in Saxony and Brandenburg, Germany, by the Sorbs.

=== Patagonian Welsh ===
Patagonian Welsh is the dialect of the Welsh language spoken by Welsh Argentinians in Patagonia, a region of southern Argentina. Though mutually intelligible with European Welsh, it has been heavily influenced by Spanish, the national language of Argentina. Many Welsh Argentinians are bilingual or sometimes trilingual in Spanish, Welsh, and English.

Later, after Argentina had firmly established itself in the area, the Argentinian government was pressured into organizing higher promotion of the Welsh language. Today, although it has been suppressed in the past, Patagonian Welsh is regularly used in public media and taught in various educational institutions.

=== Talian ===
Talian is a dialect of Venetian spoken in several provinces of Brazil. It is the result of an influx of nineteenth century Italian settlers arriving along the southern Brazilian coast.

Talian is still mutually intelligible with Venetian, and somewhat so with Italian. It has been influenced heavily by Portuguese, but it has also been influenced by German, another language island in the Brazilian coast. Most Talian speakers are at least bilingual in Talian and Portuguese, and tend to cluster around the south.

Talian has an estimated population of 500,000 speakers.

=== Others ===
- The Bielsko-Biała language island of present-day Poland
- Belgian French of Brussels (see also Francization of Brussels)
- Chipilo and Chipilo Venetian dialect
- Faetar
- Gorani
- Cypriot Maronite Arabic spoken in the village of Kormakitis
- Monégasque
- Narada
- Okuyoshino
- Palenquero
- Pennsylvania German
- Saterland
- Szeklerland
- Swabian Turkey
- Tamanic languages (culturally Dayaks)
- Upper Harz
- Yola
- Within Sinitic:
  - Tianjinnese, a Central Mandarin variety surrounded by Northern varieties
  - Ganzhounese, a Southwestern Mandarin variety surrounded by Hakka in southern Jiangxi, being one of the many Junhua
  - Hakka spoken in Sichuan Province
  - Hangzhounese, a Mandarinic variety surrounded by Northern Wu lects, caused by the change of capital during the Southern Song dynasty
  - Zhongshan Min, a group of Eastern Min and Southern Min varieties surrounded by Yue varieties, caused by migrants seeking shelter during the Song and Yuan dynasties.

== Gallery ==
The predominantly French-speaking enclave of Brussels surrounded by Dutch-speaking area

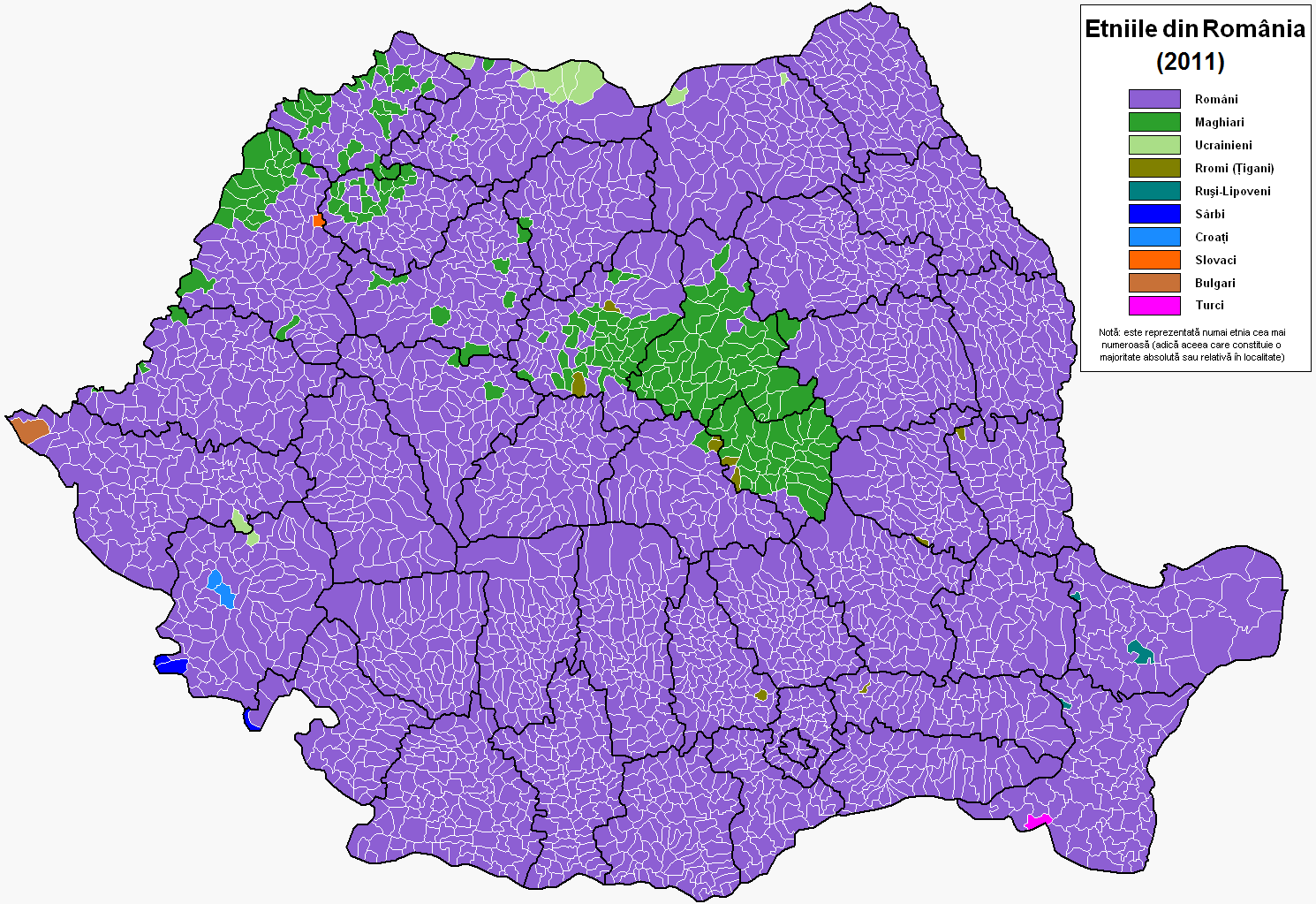
Language islands in Romania

Sorbian language area in Germany

Sanxiang of Zhongshan Min can be seen in the west coast of the Pearl River Delta, far from the rest of Southern Min

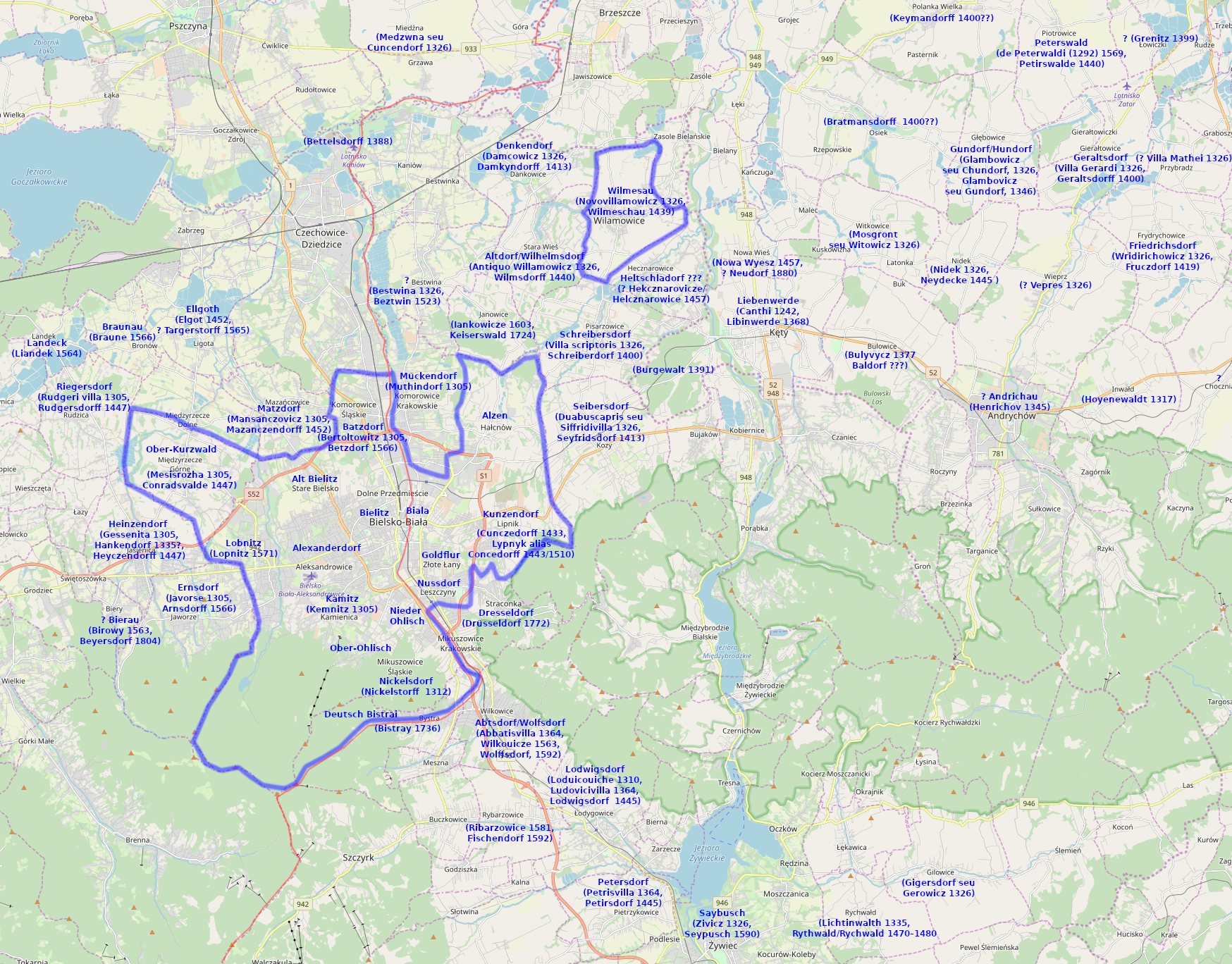
Borders of the Bielsko-Biała language island before World War II, overlaid on a map of present-day Bielsko-Biała

== See also ==
- Enclave and exclave
- Ethnic enclave
- Minority language
