= Skole Beskids =

Mountain range in Ukraine

Coordinates: 49°12′00″N 23°12′36″E

Skole Beskids, marked in red and labeled with C2

The Skole Beskids (Ukrainian: Сколівські Бескиди; Polish: Beskidy Skolskie) is a mountain range in western Ukraine, belonging to the set of ranges called the Eastern Beskids, within the Outer Eastern Carpathians.

The mountains are composed primary of Carpathian flysch. The northern section of the range is the location of the Skole Beskids National Nature Park, established in 1999; within the park is the highest peak in the range, Mount Parashka, at 1268 meters. Zwinin Mountain, at 992 meters above sea level, is also located within the park.

The Skole Beskids is also the site of the sandstone fortresses of Tustan', built between the 9th century and 13th century, now a State Historical and Cultural Reserve. It's near the town of Boryslav.

== See also ==
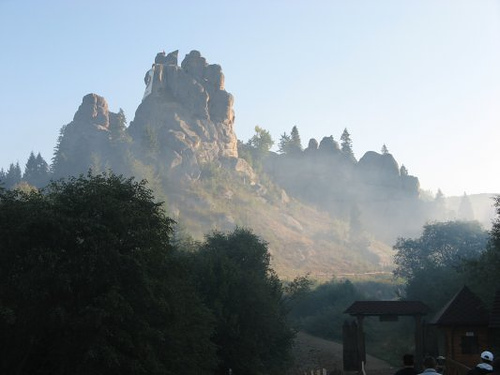
Fortress of Tustan

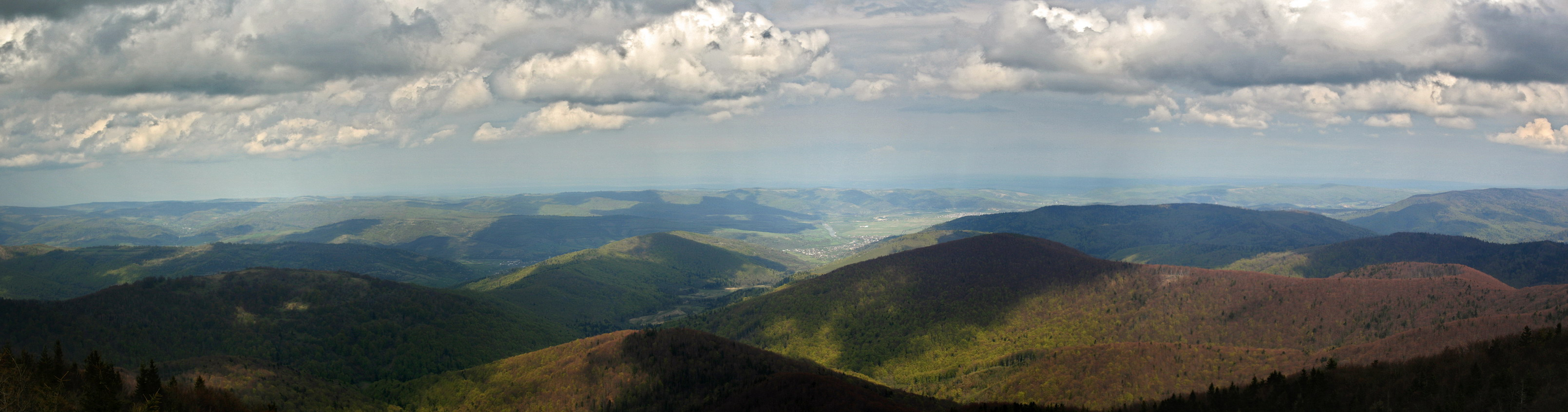
overview of the Skole Beskids

- Stryi-San Highland
- Sanok-Turka Mountains
- Ukrainian Carpathians
- Wooded Carpathians
- Bieszczady Mountains
- Divisions of the Carpathians

== Sources ==
- Földvary, Gábor Z. (1988). Geology of the Carpathian Region. Singapore: World Scientific Publishing Company. ISBN 9789813103825.

== Gallery ==
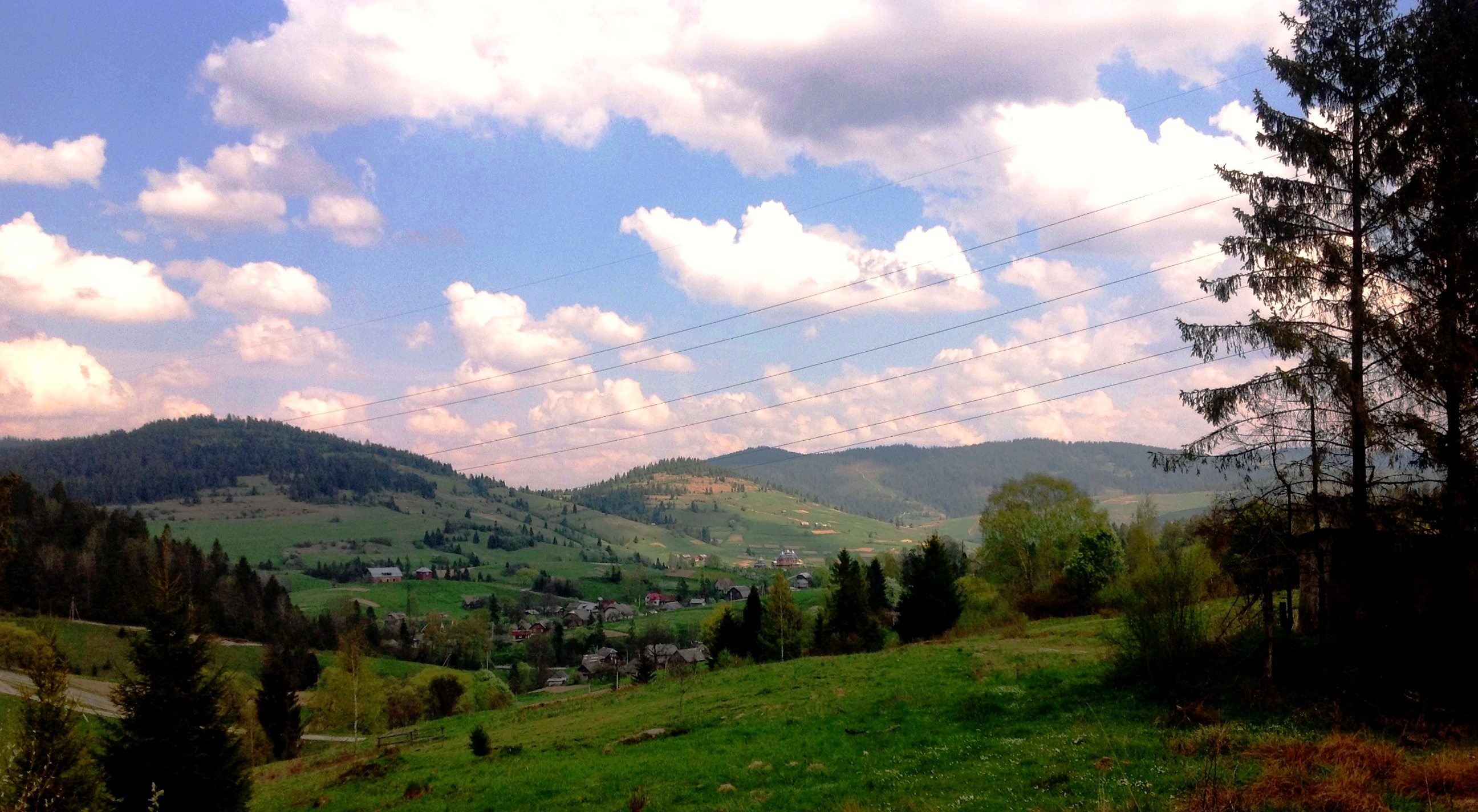
View of the village Plavie.

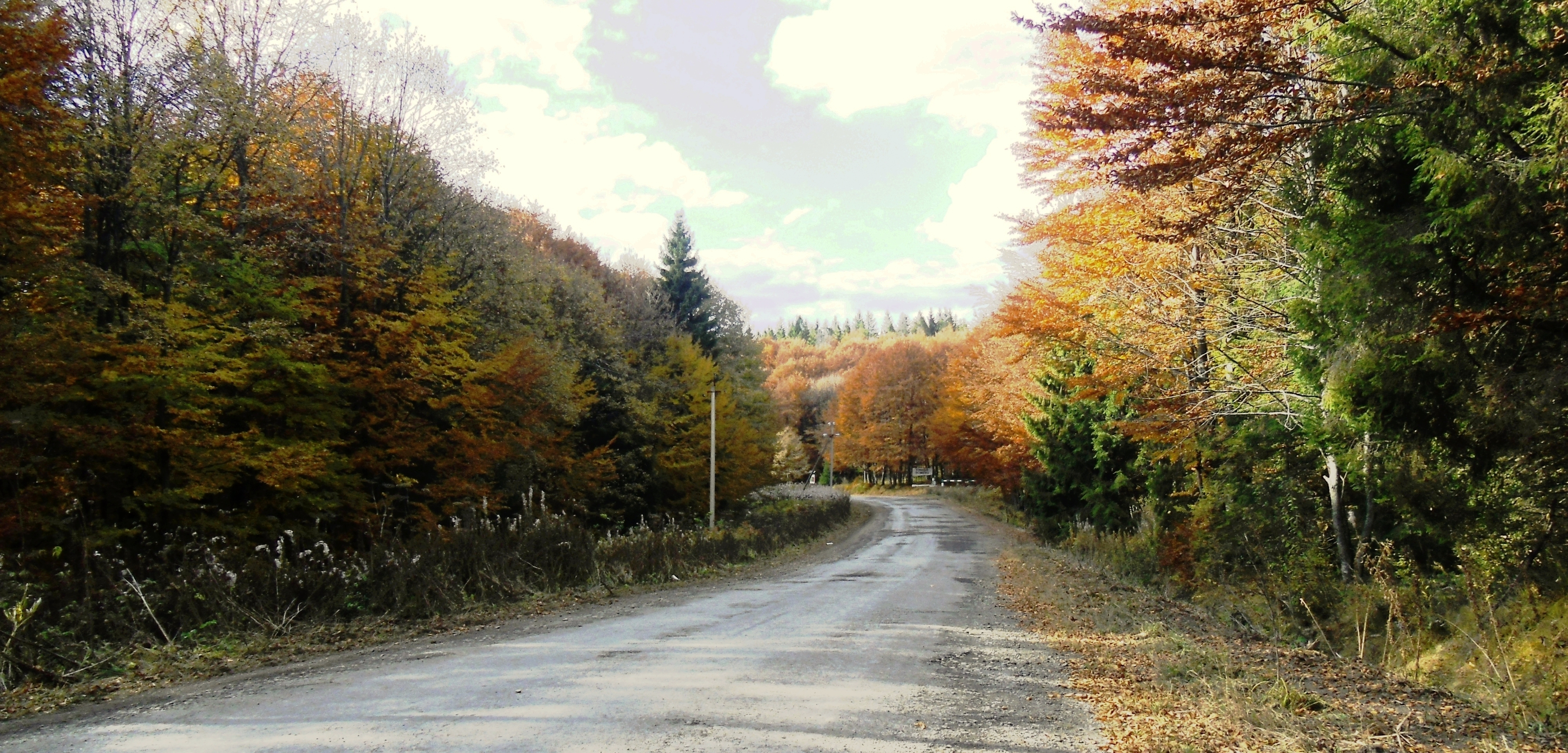
Klymets Natural Preserve, Drohobych Raion, Sambir Raion)

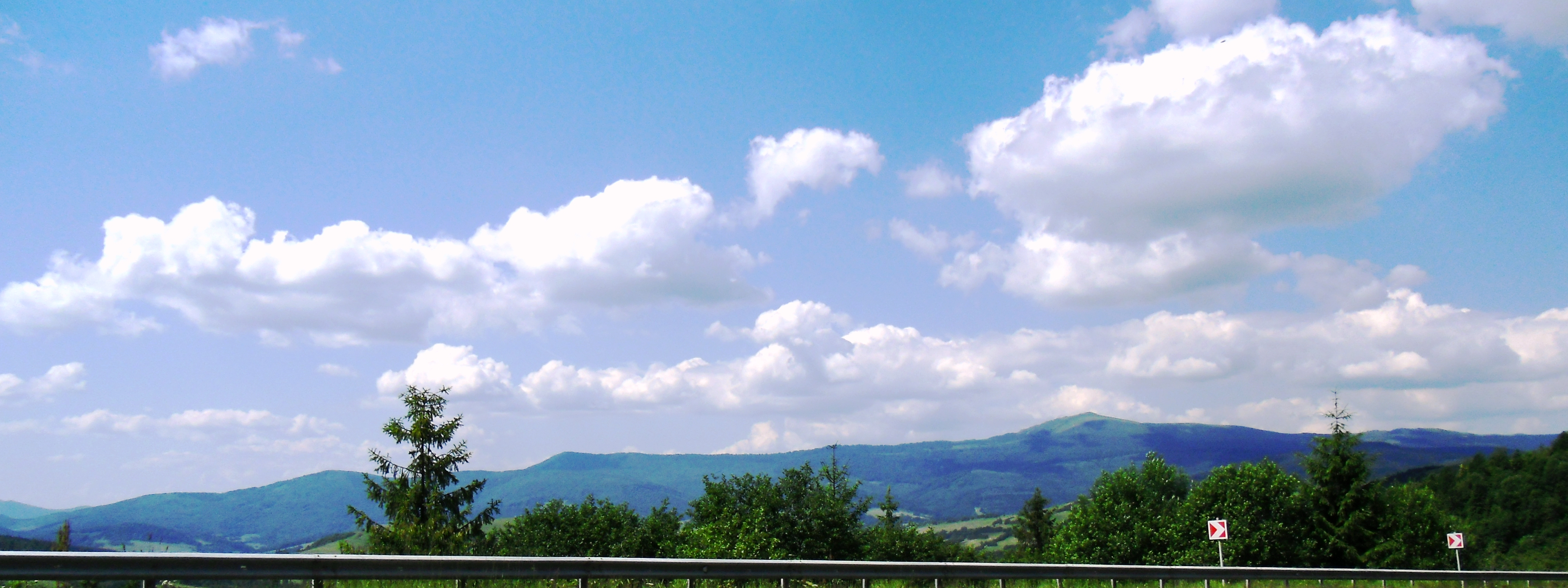
Dovzhky Range

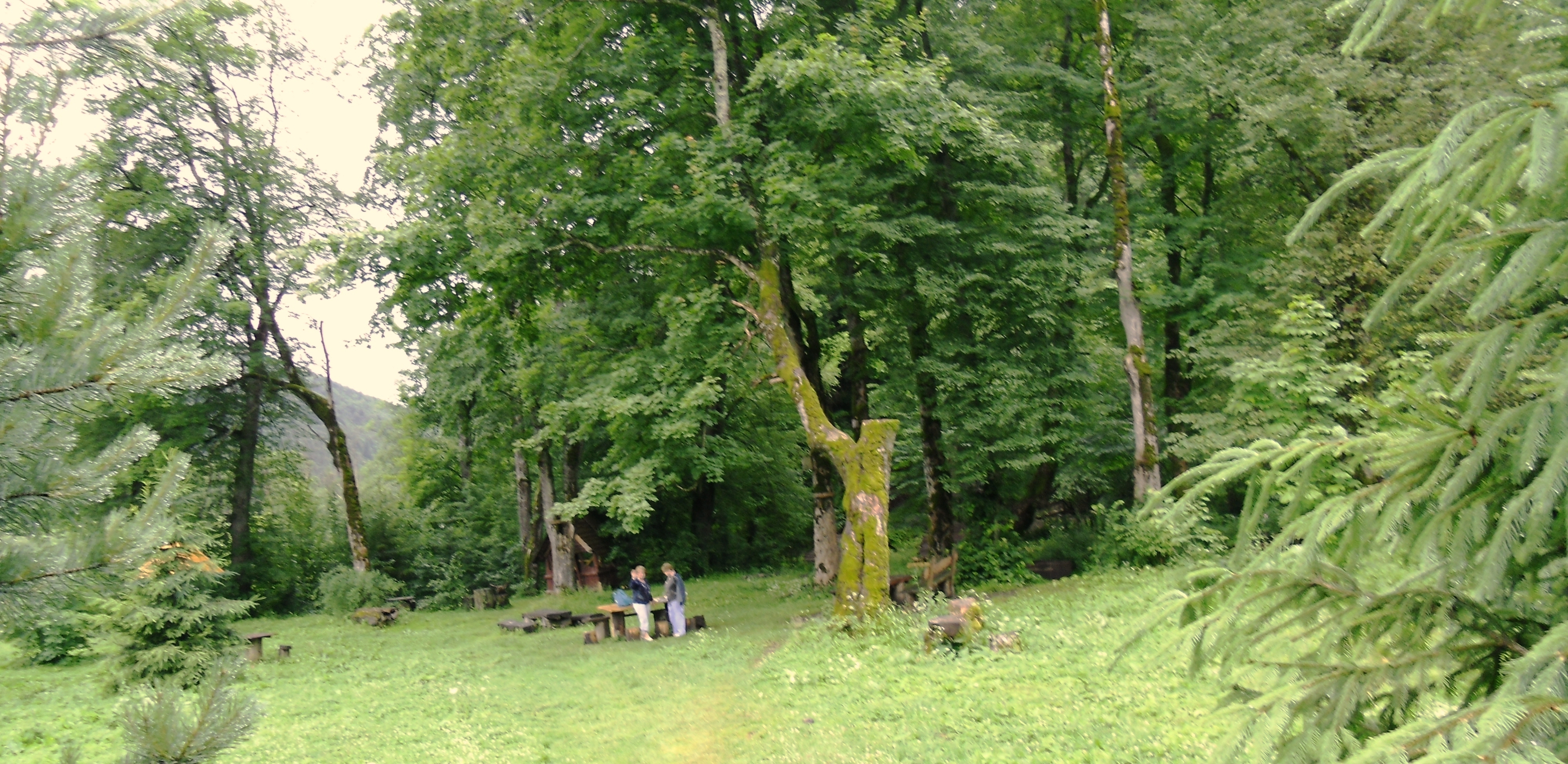
Resting place next to the highway Lviv- Uzhhorod.
