= Skole Beskids National Nature Park =

National park in Ukraine

- Ukrainian: Національний природний парк «Сколівські Бескиди»
- IUCN category II (national park)
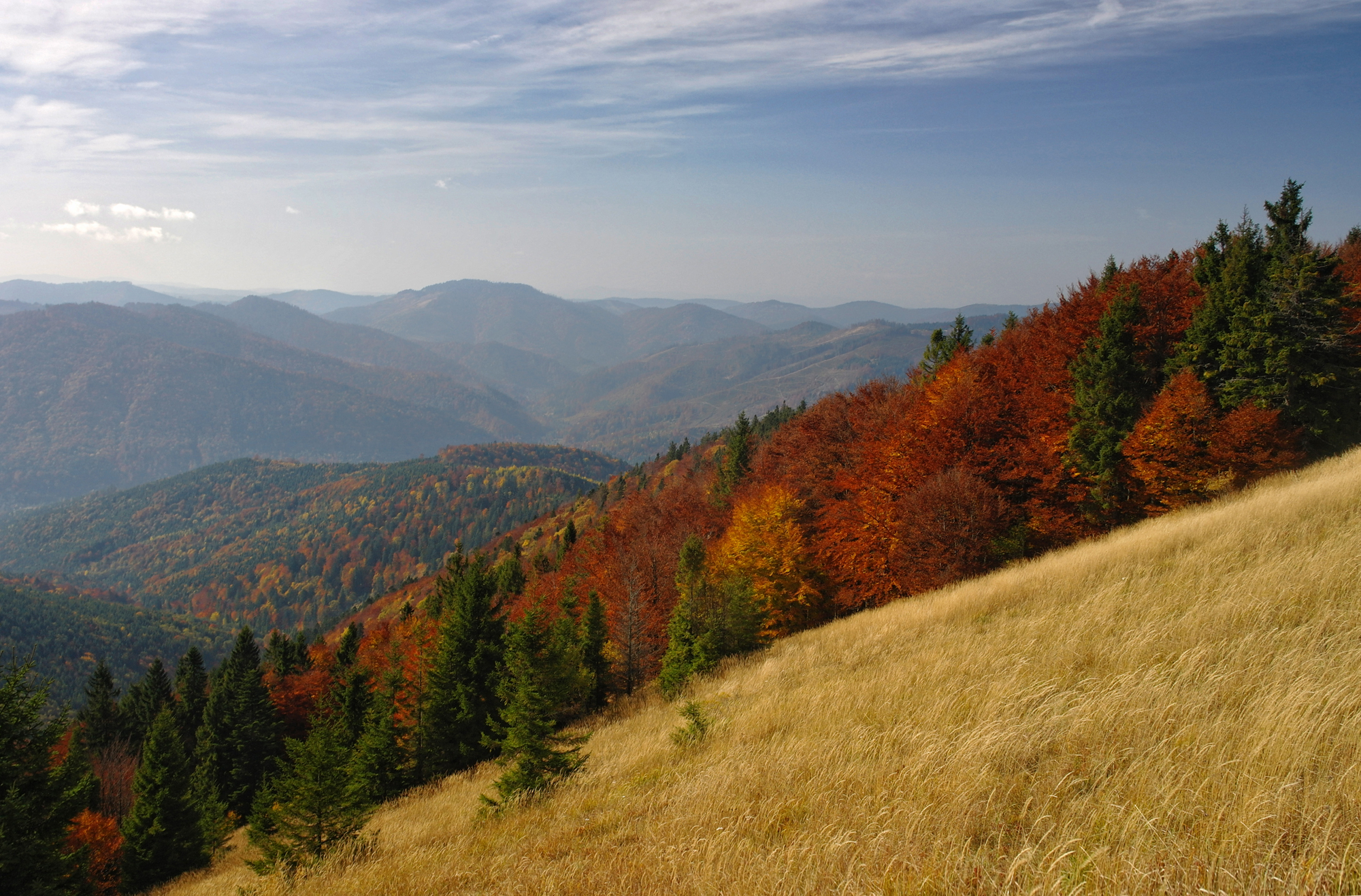
- Skole Beskids National Nature Park

- Location within Ukraine
- Location: Lviv Oblast
- Nearest city: Skole
- Coordinates: 49.2°N 23.21°E
- Area: 35,684 hectares (88,177 acres; 357 km^{2}; 138 sq mi)
- Established: 1999
- Governing body: Ministry of Ecology and Natural Resources (Ukraine)
- Website: http://skole.org.ua/

The Skole Beskids National Nature Park (Ukrainian: Національний природний парк «Сколівські Бескиди») covers the Skole Beskids Range of the Carpathian Mountains on the western edge of Ukraine. The national park was created in 1999 to protect the beech and beech-fir forests of Carpathians, and to provide for environmental, ecological, aesthetic, educational and recreational uses. The park is in Stryi and Drohobych Raions in Lviv Oblast.

== Topography ==
The terrain is mountainous, with the park divided into the valleys of both the Stryi River and the Opir River. Altitude above sea-level is 600 to 1,260 meters. The highest point in the boundaries is Mount Parashka. The mountain range runs northwest to southeast, with peaks formed by river cuts between them.

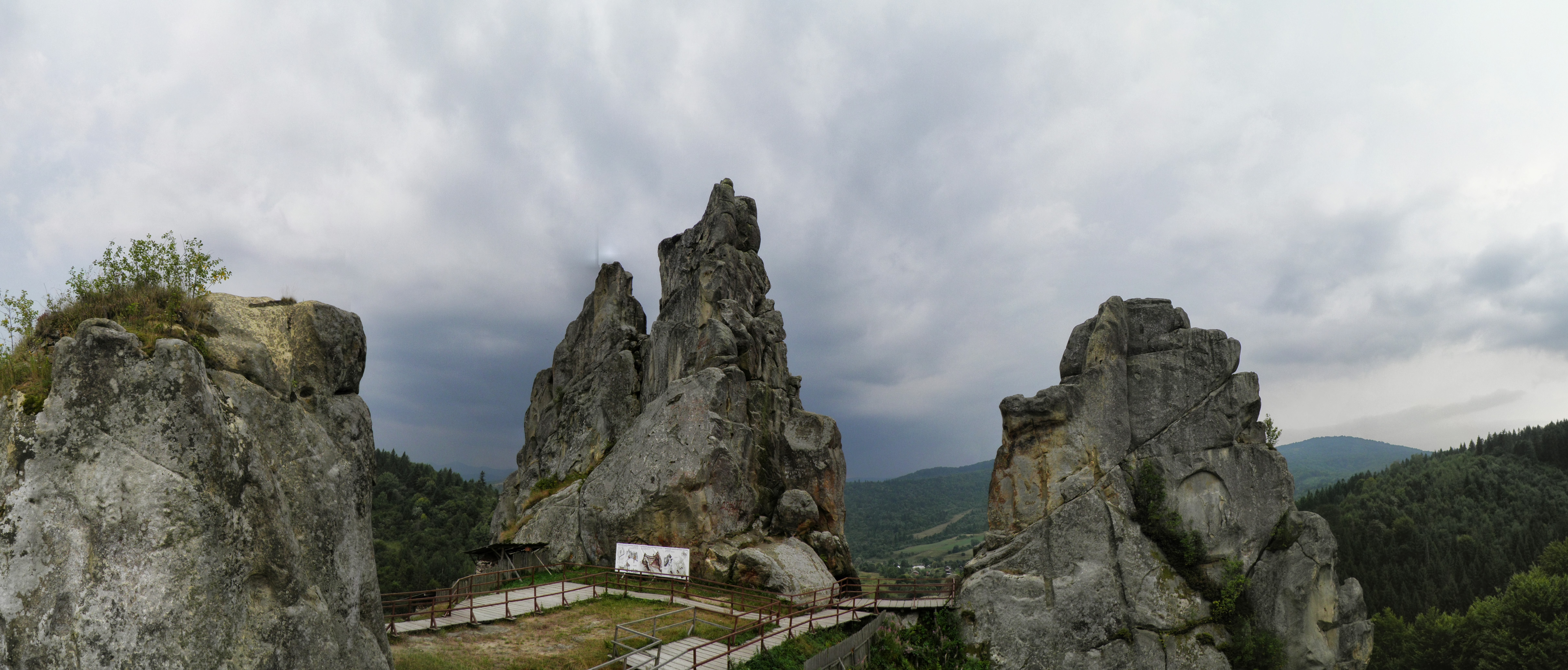
Hiking walkway, Fortress of Tustan

The geology of the range is deep-sea sedimentary rocks of the Cretaceous and Paleogene ages - known as flysch - composed of sandstones, siltstones, argillites, limestones, and marls.

== Climate and ecoregion ==
The climate of Skole Beskids is Humid continental climate, warm summer (Köppen climate classification (Dfb)). This climate is characterized by large seasonal temperature differentials and a warm summer (at least four months averaging over 10 °C (50 °F), but no month averaging over 22 °C (72 °F). In the park, the average temperature in January is −6 °C (21 °F), and 16 °C (61 °F) in July. Average precipitation is 800–1,100 millimetres (31–43 in) per year. There are frequent thaws in the winter, and average snow depth is 39 centimetres (15 in).

== Flora and fauna ==
Most of the site is forested, on gravely soils. The highest altitudes are spruce-fir-beech forest, much of it over 100 years old. Over 635 species of vascular plants have been recorded in the park, 204 vertebrate animals, 18 species of fish, 9 amphibians, 6 of reptiles, 121 species of birds, and 50 of mammals.

There are about 50 species of mammals in the national park. Among ungulates, red deer, roe deer, wild boar and 9 bison are found here. Bison were brought here in 1965 in the amount of 10 individuals (6 females and 4 males), they adapted to local conditions and were able to produce offspring. In addition bear, black ferret, red fox, yellow-breasted field and wood mice, gray wolf, fox, forest marten and others can be found here. Among the rare Red Book species on the territory of the park can be found: brown bear, forest cat, lynx, otter, badger, ermine, European broad-eared owl, long-eared owl, small horseshoe-nosed owl, small ptarmigan, and others. In addition, eight species of bats that live on the territory of the "Skolivski Beskydy" NPP are included in the Bernese List and one - in the European Red List. There are 18 species of game animals on the territory of the park, such as: deer, roe deer, wild boar, hare, squirrel, fox, forest marten.

== Public use ==
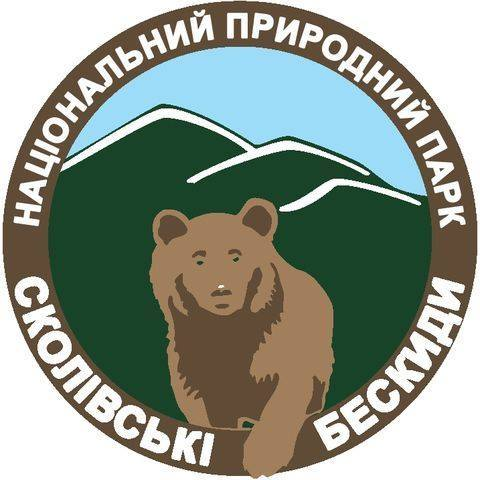
Park logo

Historically, the area has been known for health resorts and tourism, due to the mild climate and outdoors activities. The park continues this today, with over 20 recreation and boarding houses in its territory. Services offered by the park include horse excursions, ecological tours, and guided tours up Mount Parashka.

== See also ==
- National Parks of Ukraine
