= Urych =

Village in Lviv Oblast, Ukraine

Urych Урич
- Village
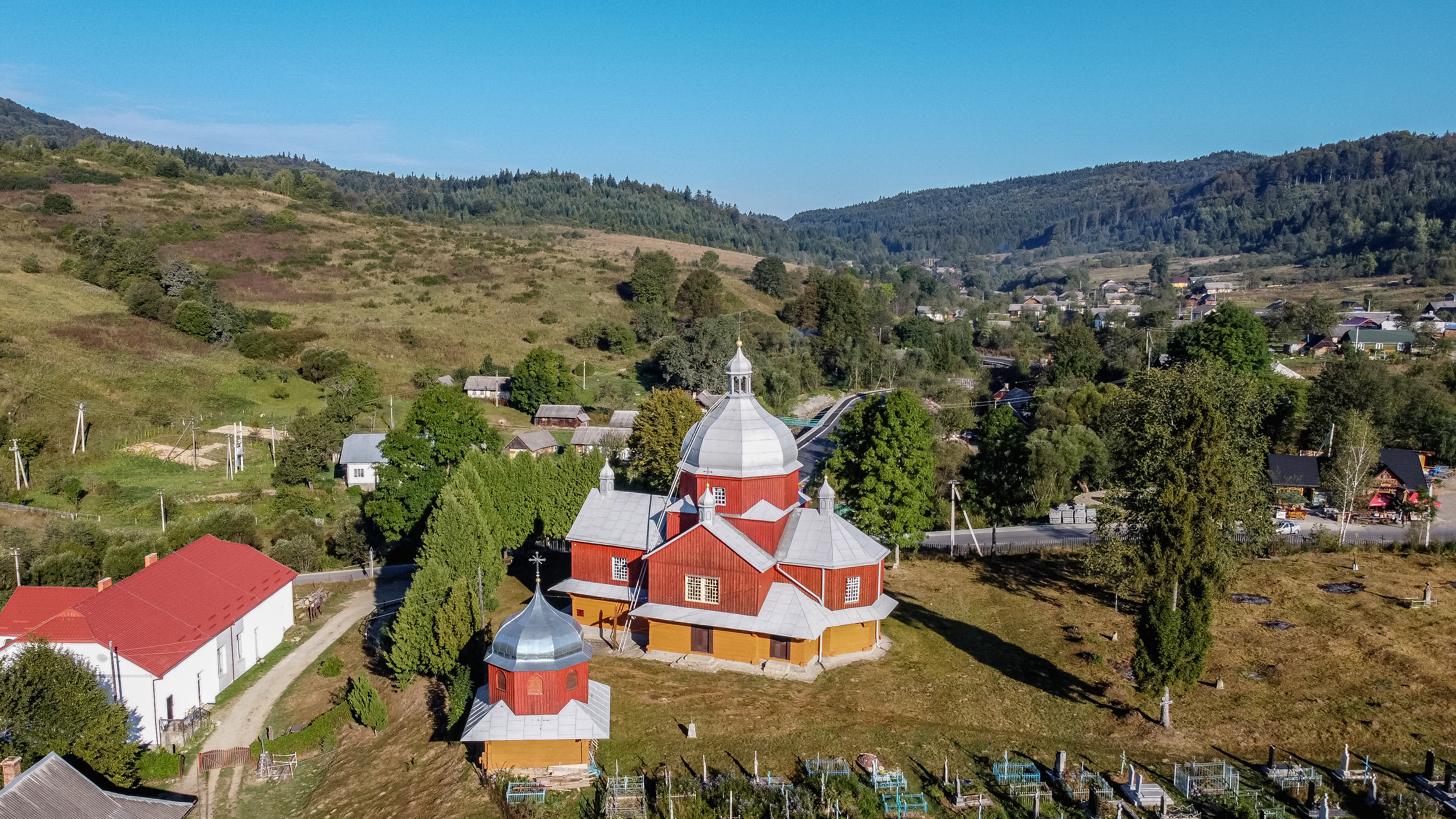
- Urych with the Church of Saint Nicholas

- Location within Lviv Oblast
- Coordinates: 49°10′55″N 23°24′20″E
- Country: Ukraine
- Oblast: Lviv Oblast
- Raion: Stryi Raion
- Hromada: Skole urban hromada
- Established: 1369

Area
  - Total: 155 km^{2} (60 sq mi)
- Elevation /(average value of): 499 m (1,637 ft)

Population
  - Total: 305
  - Density: 19,677/km^{2} (50,960/sq mi)
- Time zone: UTC+2 (EET)
  - Summer (DST): UTC+3 (EEST)
- Postal code: 82612
- Area code: +380 32251
- Website: село Урич ^{(Ukrainian)}

Urych (Ukrainian: Урич, Polish: Urycz) is a village (selo) in Stryi Raion, Lviv Oblast, of Western Ukraine. It belongs to Skole urban hromada, one of the hromadas of Ukraine. Local government is administered by the Pidhorodetska village council.

== Geography ==
It is a village located in a valley among rock ridges. The rocks located in the middle are remnants of a massive and stone-eroded Paleocene (55 million absolute age). These rocks were used in the ancient Rus cliff-side fortress complex of Tustan.

This village is located at an altitude of 499 metres (1,640 ft) above sea level, and is located at a distance of 118 kilometres (73 mi) from the regional center of Lviv, 40 kilometres (25 mi) from the city of Skole, and 8 kilometres (5.0 mi) from the urban village Skhidnytsia.

== History ==
The village was founded in 1369 and is located south of the famous resort Skhidnytsia. 1920-1939 situated in Stanisławów Voivodeship of the Second Polish Republic. During the German invasion of Poland, Wehrmacht soldiers burned here about 100 Polish soldiers in September 1939 (the Urycz massacre).

Until 18 July 2020, Urych belonged to Skole Raion. The raion was abolished in July 2020 as part of Ukraine's administrative reform, which reduced the number of raions in Lviv Oblast to seven. The area of Skole Raion was merged into Stryi Raion.

== Attractions ==
In the village there is one architectural monument of local importance of Stryi Raion– Church of Sts. Nicholas (wood) 19th century (2378-М), operates a museum history of Ruthenian Tustan fortress.
