= Urycz massacre =

The Urycz massacre, which occurred on September 22, 1939, in the village of Urycz (nowadays Urych), stands as one of the most significant war crimes committed by the Wehrmacht during its invasion of Poland. On that day, between 73 and 100 Polish prisoners of war hailing from the 4th Podhale Rifles Regiment were confined to a barn and burned alive.

== The massacre ==
During the interwar period, the 4th Podhale Rifles Regiment was stationed in Cieszyn. When the German invasion of Poland began, it was deployed into combat as part of the 21st Mountain Infantry Division. In mid-September 1939, the regiment suffered significant losses during the intense battles that unfolded along the San River.

Following these engagements, a substantial number of its soldiers were captured as prisoners of war. They were subsequently led under German escort in the direction of Drohobych. On September 22, 1939, the column of POWs halted for a rest in the village of Urycz (now known as Urych in Ukraine). At this point, those prisoners who claimed to be of Ukrainian origin or hailed from the Upper Silesia region were released. The remaining POWs, approximately 80-100 men, were taken to a nearby barn, as per German claims, where they were purportedly intended to spend the night.

At approximately 3:00 p.m., all the prisoners were gathered inside the barn. Subsequently, German soldiers closed the barn's gate, doused the building with gasoline or kerosene, and ignited it using hand grenades. The vast majority of the POWs were burned alive. Some individuals who attempted to escape the burning structure were gunned down by the German soldiers.

The precise number of victims remains uncertain. The Institute of National Remembrance reports a minimum of 73 victims, while Szymon Datner's account suggests that around 100 POWs lost their lives. Only three Polish soldiers managed to survive, though one of them succumbed to his injuries shortly afterward while hospitalized in Drohobych. The murdered prisoners did not offer any resistance, did not make escape attempts, and had not been previously accused of any wrongdoing by the Germans.

The specific German unit responsible for this atrocity remains unidentified. Antoni Dobija, one of the survivors of the massacre, could only testify that the unit was led by a Wehrmacht non-commissioned officer holding the rank of sergeant. Furthermore, the INR asserts that the German soldiers who carried out the massacre received support from unidentified Ukrainian nationalists.
