= Dzhvynuv =

Ukrainian mountain

Dzvyniv
- Дзвинів
- Location within Ukraine

Highest point
- Elevation: 1,107 m (3,632 ft)
- Coordinates: 48°58′26″N 23°44′04″E

Geography
- Country: Ukraine
- Parent range: Carpathian Mountains

The Zwinin or Dzvyniv (Ukrainian: Дзвинів; Polish: Dżwinów) is a mountain a few kilometers south of Stryi, Ukraine, in the Outer Eastern Carpathians.

The peak is 1107 meters above sea level and the ridge is 10 kilometers long. Together with the River Stryi, the mountain is part of a national park called “natsional'ny park Skolivs'ki Beskydy” (National Park of the Skole Beskids).

In World War I a battle took place from 5 February – 9 April 1915. The South-East-Army of the Central Powers took the Zwinin under the leadership of Felix Graf von Bothmer.

== Images ==
- Images from the Zwinin (in German)
- Кординати Гори Джвинув (1107.3 м) (in Ukrainian)
