= Mount Parashka =

Mountain in Ukraine

Parashka
- Парашка
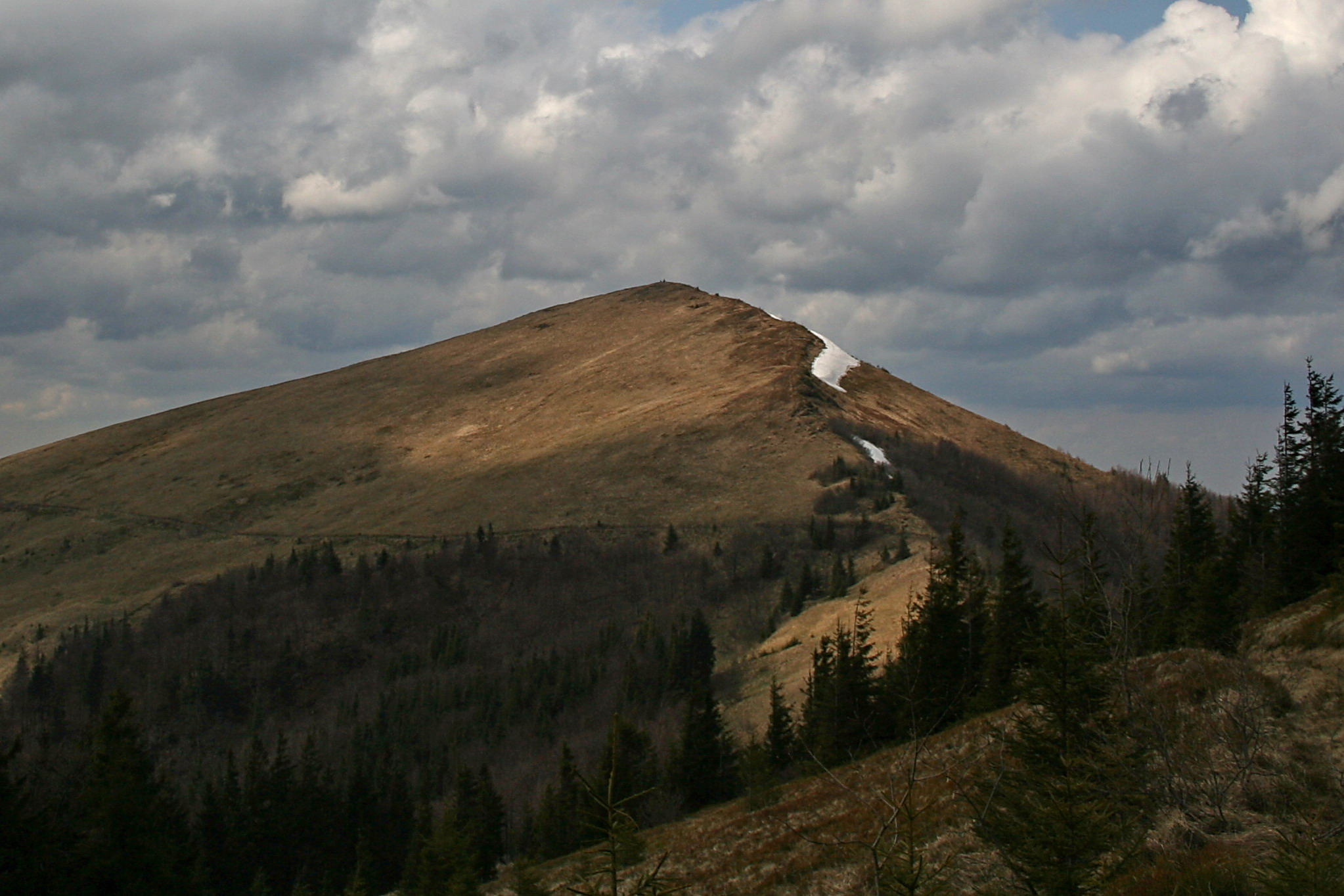

Highest point
- Elevation: 1,268.5 m (4,162 ft)
- Listing: Country high point
- Coordinates: 49°04′10″N 23°24′51″E

Geography
- Location within Ukraine
- Location: Lviv Oblast, Ukraine
- Country: Ukraine
- Parent range: Skole Beskids

Parashka (Ukrainian: Парашка) is a mountain in the Ukrainian Carpathians. It is the highest peak of the Parashka Range in the Skole Beskids (Eastern Beskids). Highest peak reaches 993 metres (3,260 ft) above sea level. It is located at a distance 8 kilometres (5.0 mi) north-west from the district center Skole and 118 kilometres (73 mi) from the regional center of Lviv.

== Etymology ==
According to legend, the mountain is named after Parashka — the daughter (according to other version — a wife) of Prince Svyatoslav Volodymyrovych, son of Volodymyr I Sviatoslavych, who was killed on this mountain by the troops of Sviatopolk I of Kyiv in 1015. This event was preceded by the battle between Sviatoslav and Sviatopolk near the town of Skole.

== Geology, ecology ==
Geologically, the mountain is formed from layered sandstones and shales. It is situated on the territory of the Skole Beskids National Nature Park.

== Fun facts ==
- Parashka is the highest peak, which lies entirely in the Lviv region.
- In good weather from the top of Parashka you can see the nearby village of Korchyn, as well as the cities of Stryy, Mykolayiv (cement plant), and even Lviv (90 km).
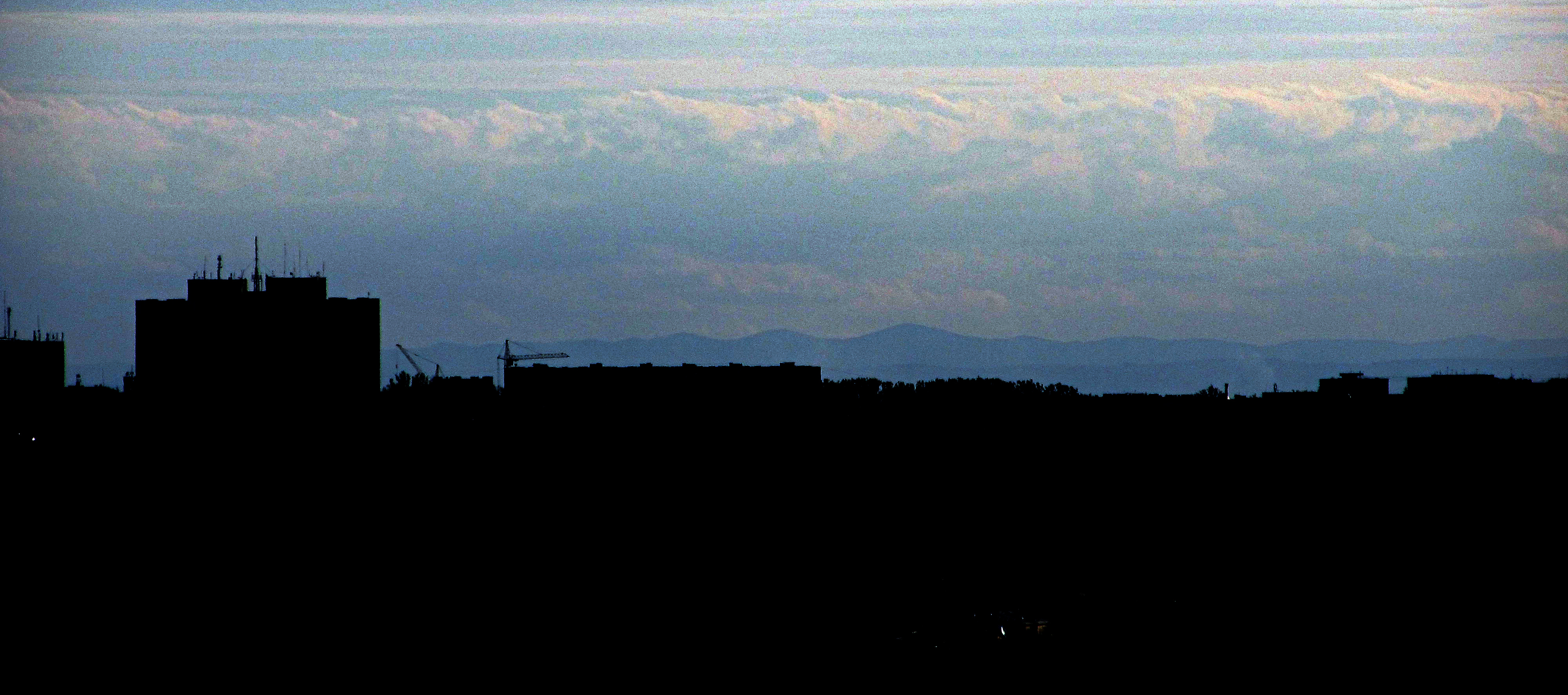
Mount Parashka (in the middle) in the background of the building of the State Tax Service. View from Lviv (90 km)

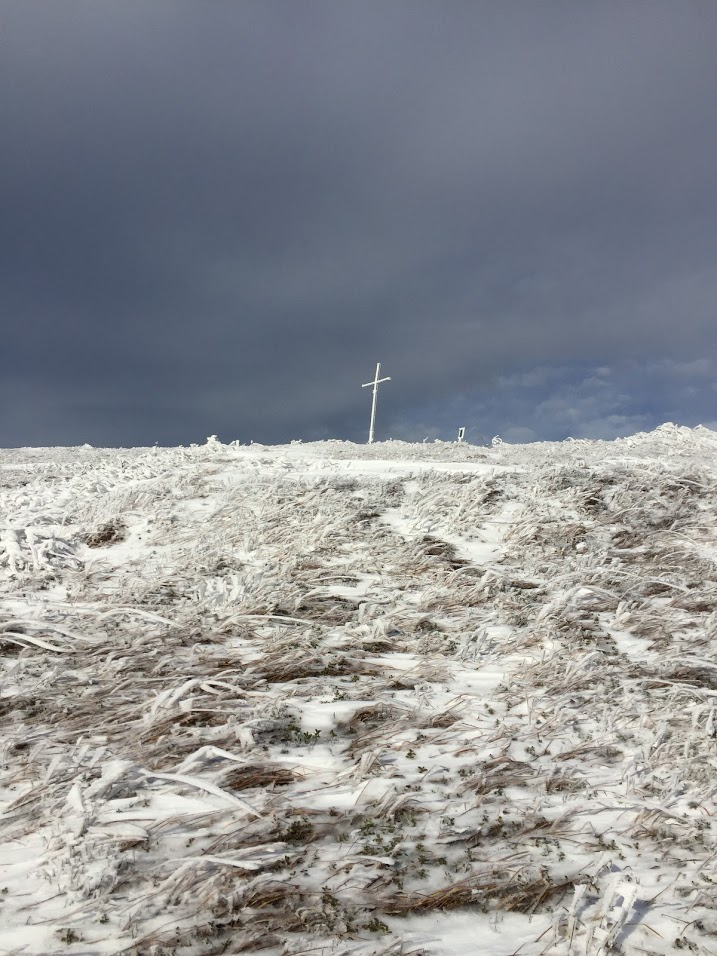
Cross on the top of Parashka
