= Fortress of Tustan =

Old Rus castle

- near the village of Urych, Stryi Raion, Lviv Oblast
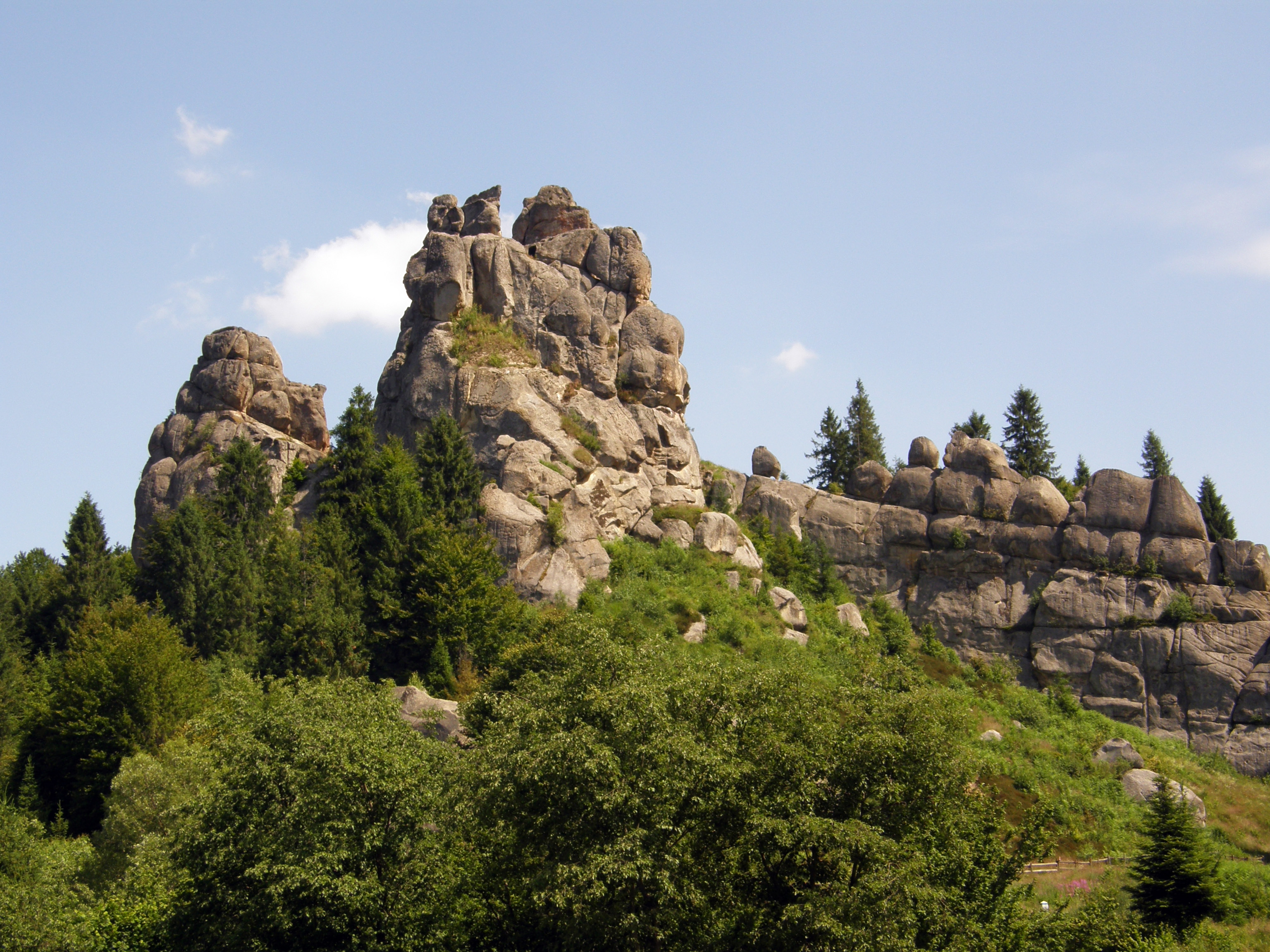

Site information
- Type: Fort

Location
- Coordinates: 49°10′55″N 23°24′20″E

Site history
- Built: 9th century

Tustan (Ukrainian: Тустань) was a Medieval cliff-side fortress-city and customs site of the 9th–16th centuries, a Kievan Rus' cliff-side defensive complex. Its remains are located in the Ukrainian Carpathians (Eastern Beskids), in the Skole district of the Lviv Oblast, near the village of Urych, southwards from the town of Boryslav and to the southern-east from the village of Skhidnytsia. The unique monument of history, archeology, architecture, and nature is situated amidst the woods of Pidhorodtsi Forestry and is part of the Tustan Site Museum.

Tustan was a defence and administrative center as well as a customs site on the important salt route leading from Drohobych through Transcarpathia to Western Europe.

== Geology and geomorphology ==
The rock complex of Tustan is composed of eroded remnants of sub-vertically incident sandstone layers of the Yamna formation of the Palaeogene. They are characterised by the nearly vertical bedding of sedimentary strata with their exotic mattress-like and globe-shaped textures. The form and character of the rocks depend on weathering conditions and the lithologic composition of sandstone. During the Mesozoic and the Paleocene Epoch of the Cenozoic, during the time of the then-existing Tethys ocean, thick layers of silt accumulated here. About 25 million years ago, in the Paleocene Epoch of the Cenozoic, along with the formation of the Carpathian Mountains, sandstones were formed, some of which rose to the surface. In geology, they are known as Yamna sandstones; the name is derived from the former village of Yanma. The complex of Urych rocks is made of separate remnants: Kamin (lit. 'Rock'), Ostryi Kamin (lit. 'Jagged Rock'), Mala Skelia (lit. 'Small Cliff'), Zholob (lit. 'Ravine'). In some places, sandstones jut out as great monoliths, in other places, they are chaotically piled boulders. There are many cracks, recesses, and small caves, including man-made.

== Origin of the names ==
The name “Tustan” has an Old Slavonic origin. It is a compound noun made of two parts: Tu and Stan. Such type of names is known in Sanskrit, Ancient Greek, and Celtic, and is typical to Slavic names known from the monuments of the 6th–7th centuries. For example, these are the names of Ants chieftains and Byzantine military leaders of Slavic origin: Dobrohost, Kalihost, Mezhmyr, Tatymyr, Khvalybud, etc.

The ancient folk etymology, recorded by the Polish historian Stanisław Sarnicki in 1585, and the modern oral tradition interpret the name as "stand here".

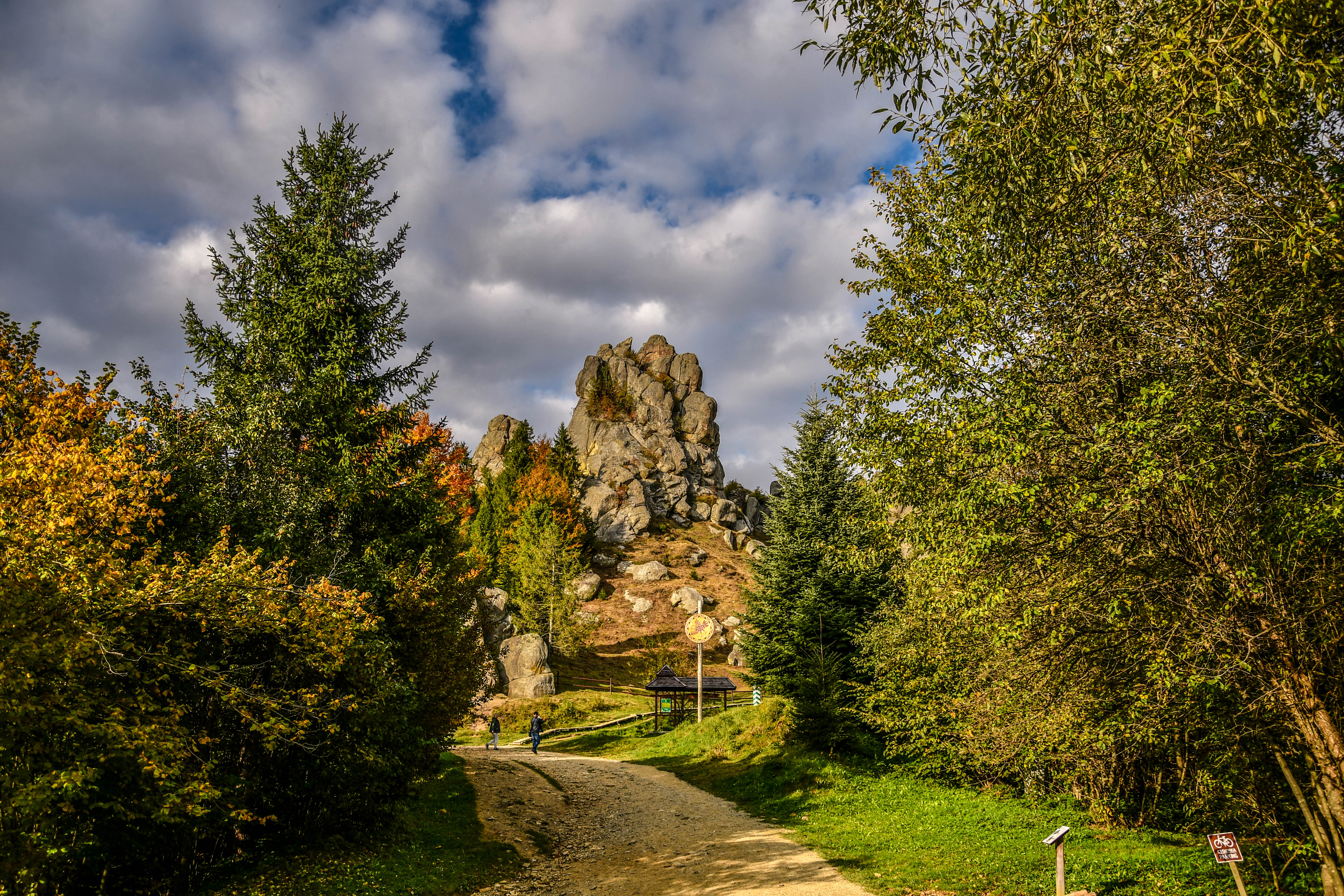
The rock complex of Tustan

== History ==
In the 9th century, the territory of modern Tustan was populated by tribes of White Croats. At the end of the 10th century, Croatian principalities that were formed in the basin of the San River, the Upper and Middle Dnister, and the Upper Prut River, were conquered by the Kyivan Rus Prince Volodymyr Sviatoslavych and annexed to Kyivan Rus.

In the mid-12th century, Tustan, together with such towns as Peremyshl, Zvenyhorod, Sanok, Horodok, Yaroslav, Vyshnia, Holohory, Synevydsko, Spas, Stara Sil, Lviv, Drohovyzh, Sambir, and Tukhlia, was part of the Peremyshl Principality. Later, the fortress was the main regional border center between the Galician-Volynian Principality and Hungary, and after former became part of the Kingdom of Poland — between the Kingdom of Poland and Hungary.

The oldest record of Tustan was of 1340 in the text of the Polish chronicler Janko of Czarnków, who was a vice chancellor of the Polish King Kazimierz III. In his chronicles, which covered the events between 1363 and 1384, among the towns and fortresses of the Rus land, newly overtaken by the king, he mentioned "Lemberg, or Lviv, the town of Peremyshl, the town and fortress of Sanok, the town of Korosno, the fortresses of Lubachiv, Terebovlia, Halych, Tustan." While Janko of Czarnków said nothing about the occupation of Tustan, the other Polish chronicler Jan Długosz (1415–1480) directly points to the fact that in 1340 "during one summer, King Kazimierz takes over the whole Rus": "Kazimierz... on the birthday of John the Baptist moved to the Rus land and occupied the towns and fortresses of Peremyshl, Halych, Lutsk, Volodymyr, Sanok, Lubachiv, Terebovlia, Tustan, other Rus towns and fortresses". The records by those two chroniclers indicate that Tustan as a defence fortress had existed before it was taken over by the Polish king in the 14th century. Archeological findings prove the same thing.

The oldest documented record about Tustan was in a letter of Pope Boniface IX of May 15, 1390. It says that Władysław of Opole handed down the town of Rohatyn, the castles of Olesko and Tustan, with their hamlets, property, and all their fields and a tithe of the profit of salt mines in Drohobych and Zhydachiv to the newly formed Galicia Catholic diocese. Besides its defensive role, Tustan had an administrative function as a center of volost. It was testified by the royal charter for the village of Krushelnytsia of November 4, 1395. It says that the village of Krushelnytsia of the Tustan volost was granted to obedient servants, Ivan and Damian, and their sons with all its property: forests, pasture grounds, fields, and hayfields.

Later, the fortress was overtaken by Polish magnates and gentry. Which was testified by the royal charter of 1539. The king, at the request of Jan of Tarnów, grants to Mikolaj Blizinski and his heirs "the fortress of Tustan, that is, the rocks only in the Stryi mountains near the border with Hungary". They promised to "defend, restore, reinforce, and maintain this castle on the rocks". It is not known if the fortress of Tustan was restored and reinforced, but in 1541 Blizinski granted the village of "Pidhorodtsi and the fortress of Tustan" to Jan of Tarnów.

Tustan was a customs site. A salt trade route went through it. The route started in Drohobych, went through the village of Tustanovychi, Tustan and the village of Pidhorodtsi, and then along the valleys of the Stryi and the Opir reached the Carpathian passes and went down to the western European countries. Toponyms like Pidhostynets, Hostynets and mount Tovar indicate the existence of the trade route. Tustan guards collected customs from merchants and ensured their protection during goods shipment.

The fact that the fortress of Tustan existed till the 16th century was proven by the archeological expedition findings and by documents: the last records about the fortress was dated by 1565, in an inventory of the Drohobych saltworks. It said: "...in Tustan they collect customs duty from merchants who travel over the mountains, passing by Drohobych. Customs duty... is 14 zloty".

Several factors caused the gradual decline of the fortress:

1) Economic: in the 16th century, the countries of Central Europe started their own salt quarries, hence no demand for salt from Galicia. Tustan ceased to be a customs site.

2) Political: Tustan ceased to play any role of a border defence fortress because of stabilised political relations between Poland and Hungary and shifting the Polish border further east.

3) Military: Tustan lost its defensive function due to changes in military equipment and military tactics.

== Architecture ==
Video of Tustan from drone

The cliff-side city and fortress of Tustan has a special place in wooden construction of the Middle Ages. Rock formations, which are mighty defence walls themselves, were smartly used by builders. Gaps between rocks were closed with wooden walls, preventing any approaches to the fortress. Special cuts – grooves and hollows – were made in rock surfaces to secure log structures. Those traces allow recreating the appearance of the fortress during the 9th–16th centuries, despite the fact that the log structures were not preserved. Only on the rock complex Kamin of Tustan, over 4,000 traces of the cliff-side construction were detected and studied.

Having analysed all traces, the main researcher of Tustan, Mykhailo Rozhko, came to a conclusion that the fortress was built in several stages; then it was constantly built up, grew taller and claimed the top grounds of the rock complex. In the 13th century, during the period of its heyday, the fortress embraced all possible galleries and terraces from the very bottom to the top. The height of the complete construction in the courtyard reached five storeys, each 3.5–4.0 m tall, which is a sign of a very advanced level of construction technology.

For water supply during siege, the fortress had a well at the bottom of the rocks and two cisterns. As of today, only the remains of the stone wall survived. Mykhailo Rozhko dated the wall construction with the 2nd half of the 13th century. The wall was 2.5 m thick and covered the grooves cut in the rock surfaces for wooden walls.

== Archeology ==
During the archeological investigations of the fortress of Tustan over 25,000 archeological findings were collected. Among them were wooden elements from the construction, metal items, pottery, glass, and leather goods.

The most interesting metal items are an engolpion, a ring head with an engraved image of a bird, a bronze mace, a sledge-hammer, an axe, arrowheads for a crossbow, arrowheads for a longbow, spearheads, fire strikers, spurs, bell clappers, cutters, wood chisels, needles, and book clasps.

Wooden findings are represented with a number of wooden structures, among which are fragments of six doorposts, pole structures of galleries, fragments of beams, treenails, boards with dovetails joints, laths, shingles, wooden spoons, and a spade. The discovered fragments of pottery are dated by the 9th–16th centuries. Also, there were tiles, some fragments of which bear the image of George the Dragonslayer.

== Petroglyphs ==
Rock surface images (petroglyphs) belong to a vast and somewhat mysterious area of monuments of ancient culture and art. Rock images of Tustan are mostly located on the largest and central group, Kamin, and are in difficult to reach places.

Among all Tustan petroglyphs, the researcher Mykola Bandrivskyi paid attention to a group of images shaped like a circle, a disk or schematic roundish figures. Such signs are called solar signs. The researcher analysed the location of those solar signs and came to a conclusion that they were put on rock surfaces in accordance with a certain system. However, not all researchers agree with the theory about the handmade origin of "solar signs". In particular, a professor of geology Bohdan Ridush proved that those are natural reliefs of petrified sponges, which appeared in the process of sandstone weathering.

Handmade petroglyphs also survived in Tustan. Individual images of animals are particularly interesting: a wolf chasing an elk, a horse and a rider. During archeological excavations led by M. Rozhko, on the slopes of Velyke Krylo (lit. 'Big Wing') a group of petroglyphs was discovered, including five axes, two crosses, and one swastika.

A large group of petroglyphs could have been created in the 18th–20th centuries, when the rocks of Tustan were a well-known tourist attraction. A significant group of the monuments is made of heraldic signs. They are mostly tridents as well as symbols of various organizations.

== Research ==
Scientific interest in the rocks in Urych appeared in the 19th–20th centuries and was associated with folklore studies. In the 20th century, Y. Pasternak, O. Ratych, P. Rapoport, and R. Bahriy studied Tustan.

In 1971–1978, Mykhailo Rozhko, together with a group of enthusiasts, systematically measured the existing traces of the construction and made the first reconstructions of the fortress. In 1978, a new stage in the research of Tustan began with an expedition of the Lviv Regional Organization of the Ukrainian History and Culture Protection Society. In 1979–1991, the expedition was transformed into the Carpathian Architectural and Archeological Expedition at the Academy of Sciences of Ukraine under the supervision of Mykhailo Rozhko. The systematic study by Mykhailo Rozhko of the Tustan rock formations allowed the researcher to carry out a spatial and volumetric reconstruction of the fortress complex of Tustan with the rock group of Kamin in the center and separate defence and guarding points on Ostryi Kamin and Mala Skelia. The reconstruction of five periods of the fortress’ wooden construction was done based on the archaeological findings, architectural and archaeological measurements of the rocks with traces of the construction and remains of brick walls. The survey of similar landscape-architectural objects with traces of wooden structures located in Bubnyshche, Rozghirche, Pidkamin, and other fortified sites not far from Tustan also allowed to make conclusions about the nature of the construction and the architecture of Medieval fortifications, located in mountainous, rocky places, and to define the monument's place in the complex of the then-defensive objects of the Eastern Carpathians.

== Tustan Site Museum ==
In order to protect the Tustan site, the Tustan State Historical-Cultural Reserve was established in 1994 by the decision of the Cabinet of Ministers of Ukraine. The Lviv Historical Museum was in charge of the reserve. In 2005, a special administration was formed. In September 2016, it was restructured under the Lviv Oblast Council as a municipal body named "The Administration of the Tustan State Historical and Cultural Reserve". Later, its name in English was changed into the Tustan Site Museum, which is used today.

== In culture ==
Tustan is mentioned as one of the locations in Ivan Franko's novel Zakhar Berkut.

== Sources ==
- Rozhko V. Methods of Graphical Reconstruction Of Log Cliff-Side Architecture / V. Rozhko // Proceedings of the Third International Congress on Construction History / edited by Kurrer K.-E., Lorenz W., Wetzk V. — Berlin : Neunplus1, 2009. — Vоl. 3. — P. 1287 — 1292. ISBN 978-3-936033-31-1
- Rozhko M. Defining the Ninth to Thirteenth Century Fortress Tustan’ : Building Archaeology of a Log, Cliff-side Structure / М. Rozhko, V. Rozhko, М. Stachiv // Proceedings of the Second International Congress on Construction History / edited by Dunkeld M., Campbell J., Louw H., Tutton M., Addis B., Powell C., Thorne R. — Cambridge-Exeter : Short Run Press, 2006. — Vol. 3. — P. 2743 — 2757. ISBN 0-7017-0205-2
- Рожко М.Ф. Архітектура та система оборони Українських Карпат у княжу добу. – Львів: БаК, 2016. – 232 с. ISBN 978-966-2227-38-3
- Пам‘ятки Тустані в контексті освоєння Карпат у доісторичну добу та в середньовіччі; проблеми їх збереження та використання : матеріали ІІІ Міжнародної наукової конференції, 7—8 квітня 2016 р., Львів; Урич / Відп. за вип. Р.Г. Миська. — Львів, 2016. — 184 с.
- Фортеця: збірник заповідника “Тустань”. – Л.: Колір ПРО, 2012. – Кн. 2. – 640 с. ISBN 978-966-2501-09-4
- Фортеця: збірник заповідника “Тустань”: на пошану Михайла Рожка. – Львів: Камула, 2009. – Кн. 1. – 720 с. ISBN 978-966-433-032-6
- Рожко М.Ф. Тустань – давньоруська наскельна фортеця: наукове видання / Михайло Федорович Рожко. – К.: Наукова думка, 1996. – 272 с.
- М. Ф. Рожко, Р. Г. Миська. Тустань // Енциклопедія історії України : у 10 т. / редкол.: В. А. Смолій (голова) та ін.; Інститут історії України НАН України. — К. : Наук. думка, 2013. — Т. 10 : Т — Я. — С. 187. — ISBN 978-966-00-1359-9.
