= Drohobych salt plant =

Salt plant in Drohobych, Ukraine

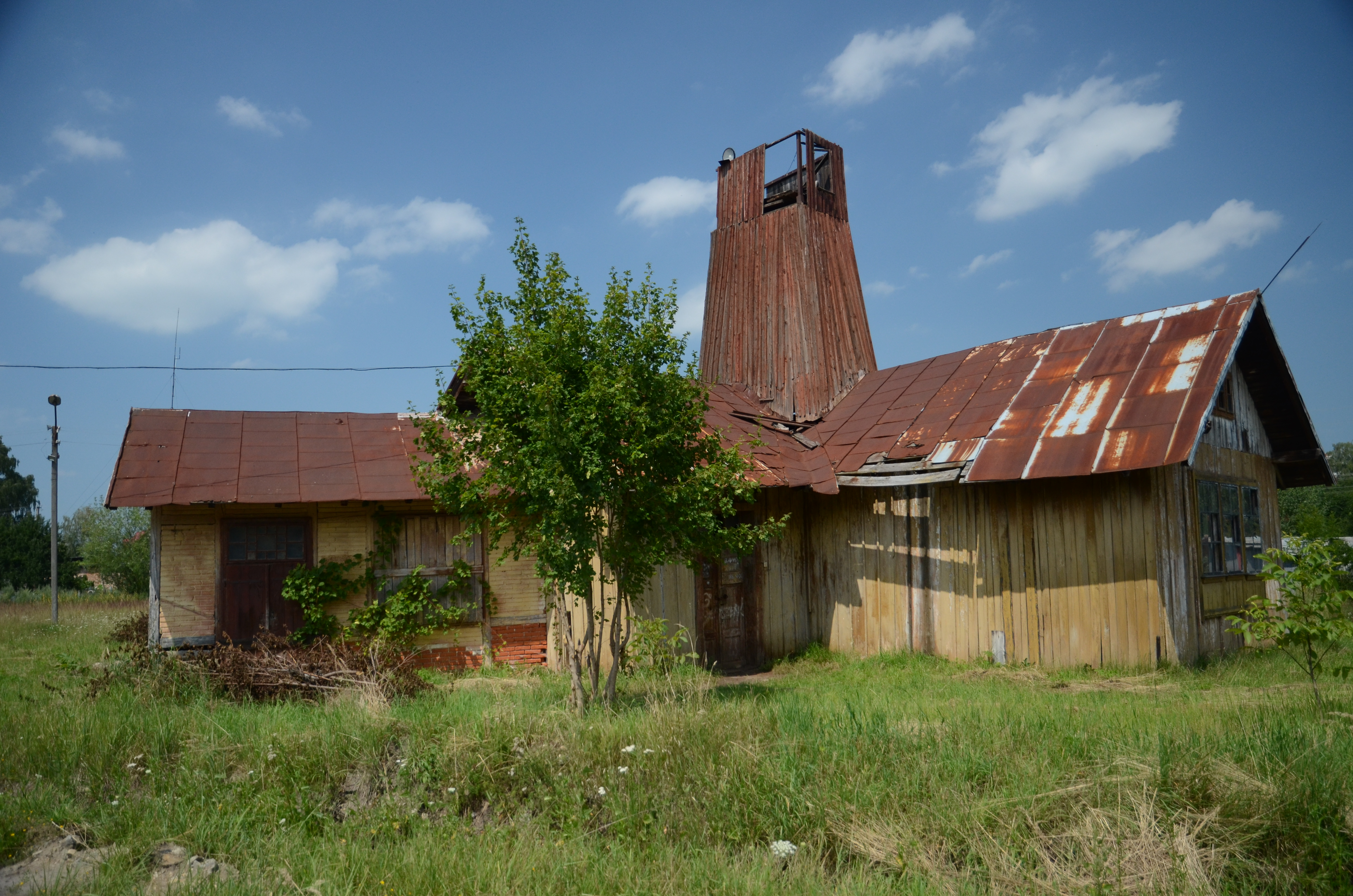
- Old saltworks of Drohobych, pictured in July 2018
- Native name: Дрогобицький солевиварювальний завод
- Industry: Salt production
- Founded: 1250
- Headquarters: Drohobych, Lviv Oblast, Ukraine
- Products: salt

Immovable Monument of Local Significance of Ukraine
- Official name: Комплекс споруд Дрогобицького солеварного заводу (Building complex of the Drohobych salt plant)
- Type: Architecture
- Reference no.: 1458-Лв
- Website: https://drohobych-saltworks.com/

The Drohobych salt plant (Ukrainian: Дрогобицький солевиварювальний завод), or Drohobych saltworks, in existence since 1250, is the oldest working salt plant in Drohobych, Lviv Oblast, Ukraine.

== History ==
The Drohobych salt plant has been in operation since at least the 13th century on territory close to sources of raw materials called "salt brine". The foundation of the salt plant was in 1250, and it is believed that this plant is the oldest working industrial company in Ukraine. During this time, Drohobych was one of the richest cities in the Carpathian region making this important in the history of the last decades in the existence of the Galicia-Volhynia principality.

Drohobych's growth was caused by the salt manufactory, which provided not only the Galician and Transcarpathia regions but also the Volhynia, Kholm, and Kyiv regions with salt. In 1339 Drohobych was occupied by Polish seigniors and the Drohobych salt manufactory became the part of the royal property. At that time salt was the most famous good produced in Drohobych. Chumaks from the entire Ukraine area (Podillia, Bratslavshchyna, and Volhynia regions) came to Drohobych to purchase salt.

Volhynia piers (found on the river Sluch and Horyn) were used to load Drohobych salt on komiahy (disposable ships), then the salt was transported to Pripyat, and after that it was shipped along the Dnieper straight to Kyiv. The towers in Drohobych, Yasenytsia, and other surrounding villages belonged to the king, where peasants were forced to work. The king never visited the area.

Rich Italian merchants rented salterns (salt water pools) because they had caravans traveling from Italy through Lviv and Bukovina to the Crimean city of Caffa. During the 14th and 15th centuries these merchants were the intendants and the main workers of the saltern in Drohobych. This benefited King and merchants alike. Italians merchants produced high-quality salt, thus greatly expanding trade relations between Drohobych and Europe; however, this brought many conflicts in Drohobych. These conflicts were caused by the citizens' opinion that only some people were seeing profits. Conflict in 1491 between Italians merchants and Drohobych citizens was resolved with the help of the king's decree.

The king declared that people have to produce a cart (containing 6000 salt barrels). In the years after this, each citizen entering Drohobych was charged 3 dinars per cart of either salt or other goods. Money was used to keep the Drohobych city streets in good condition. According to documents dating back to 1768, it is known that the upper layer of the road situated in Zhupna street (which exists today) was made of wood. The territory between the saltern and Zhupna Street was joined by the bridge constructed above the river Pobuk. At that time two wells could be found on the territory of Drohobych saltern: the King's saltern and baron Hartenberg's private saltern.

Proceeds from both of these two salters were used to fund a Cathedral hospital known as "the hospital for the poor". According to documents from 1565, 26,000 barrels of salt were produced in Drohobych; half of this was produced in King's saltern and other half by private salterns. Nowadays, Drohobych salt is producing two types of high-quality salt.

== Gallery ==
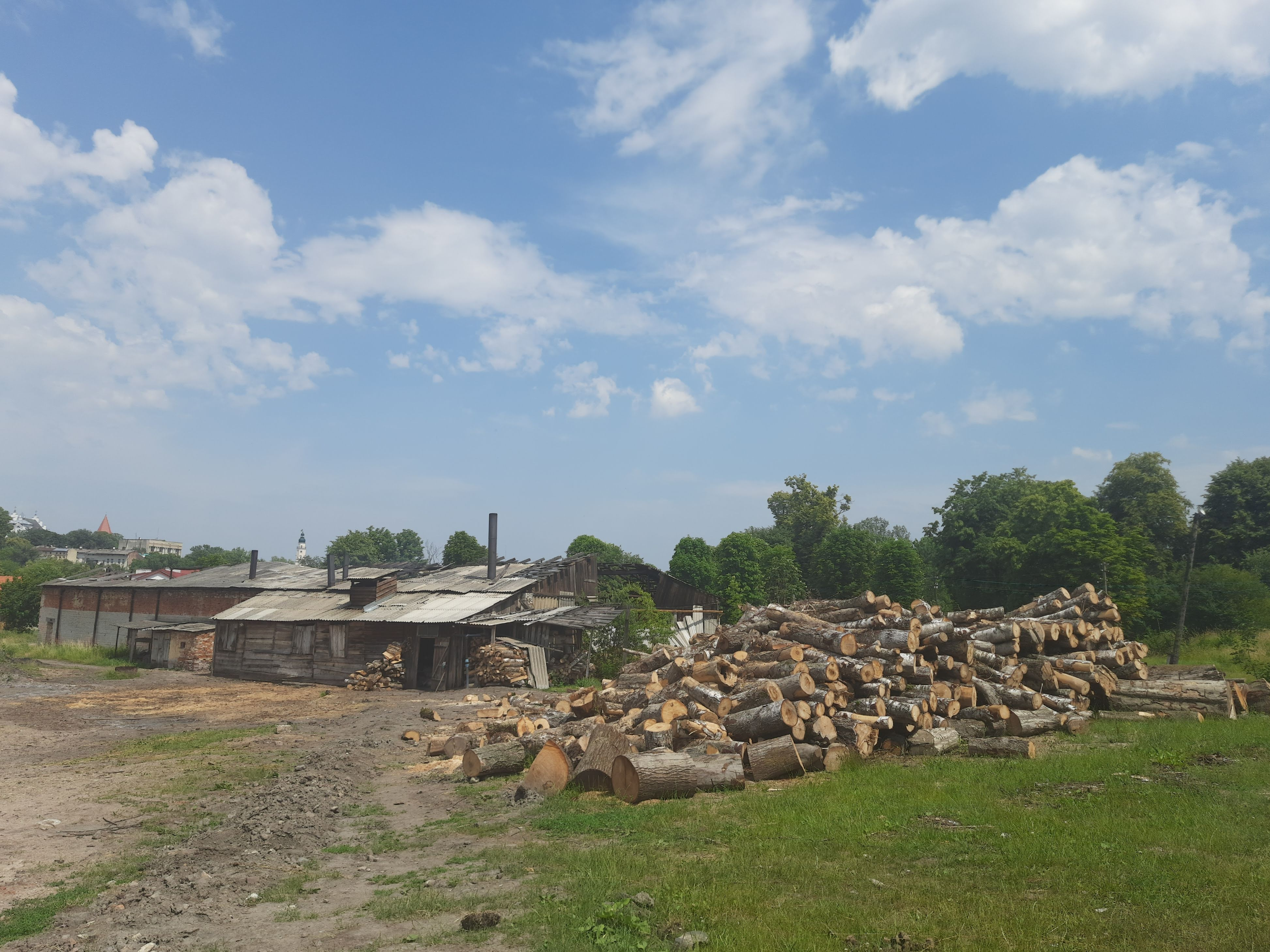
Brine storage buildings (left)

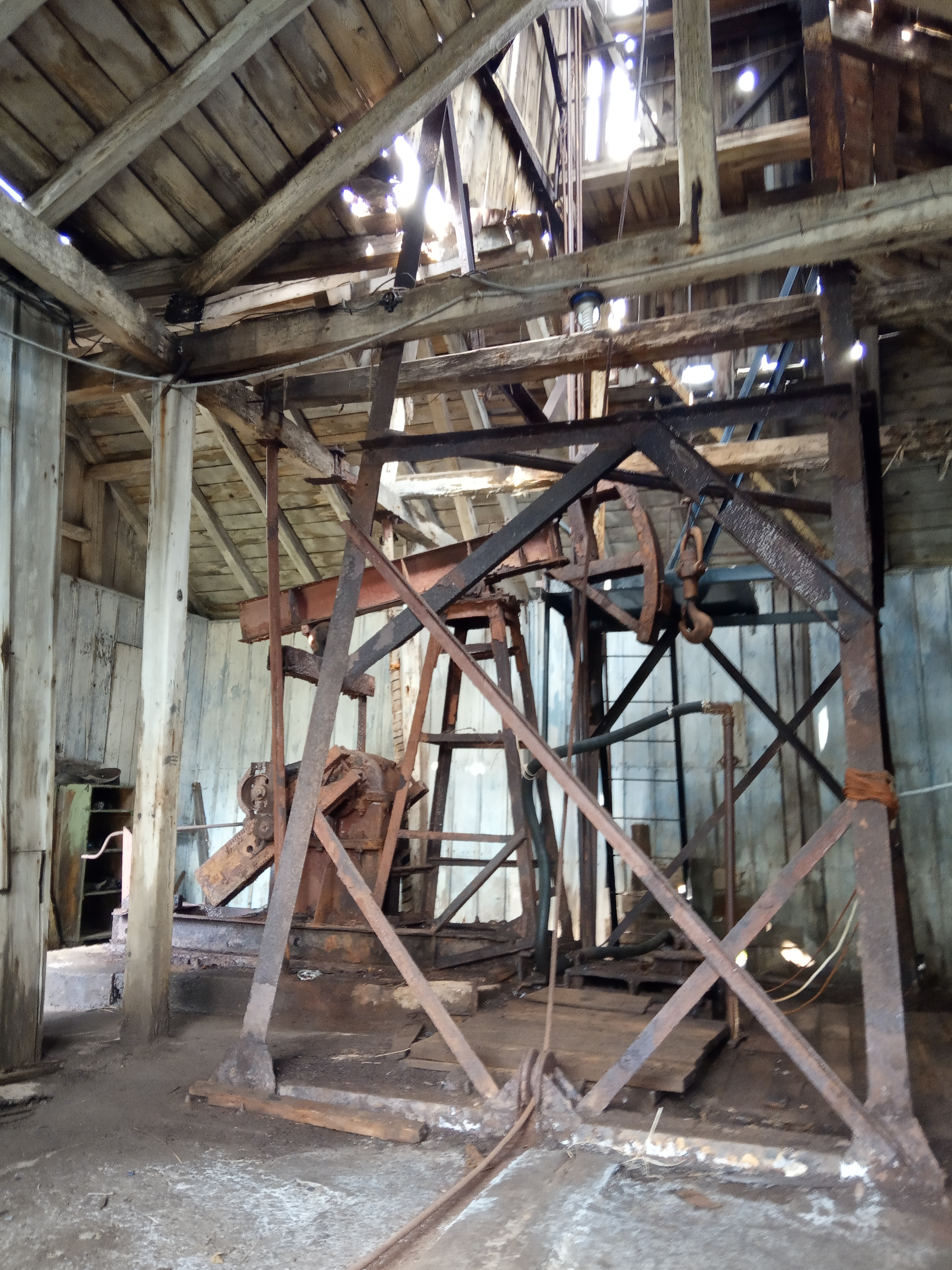
Old mine interior

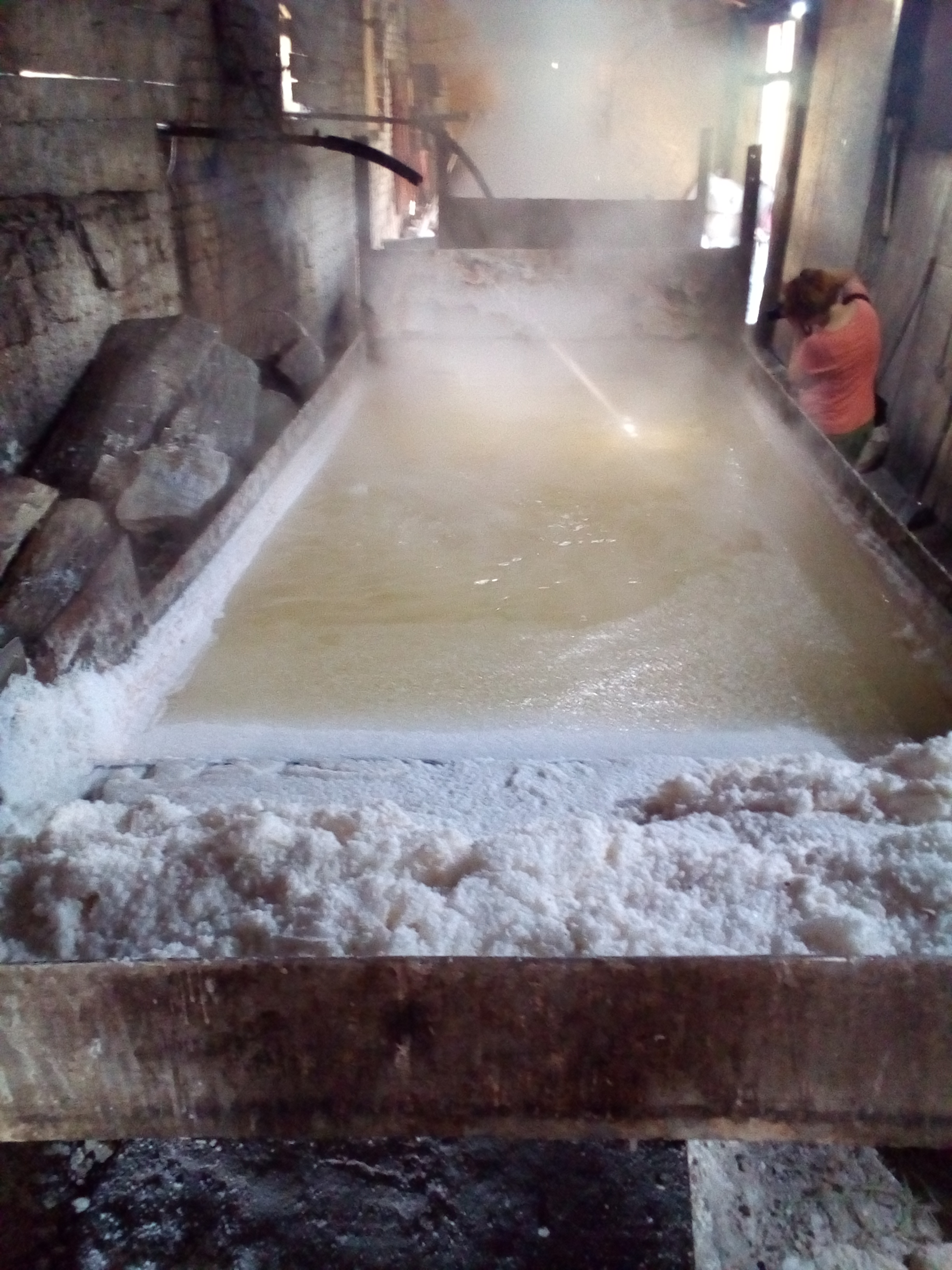
Brine boiling

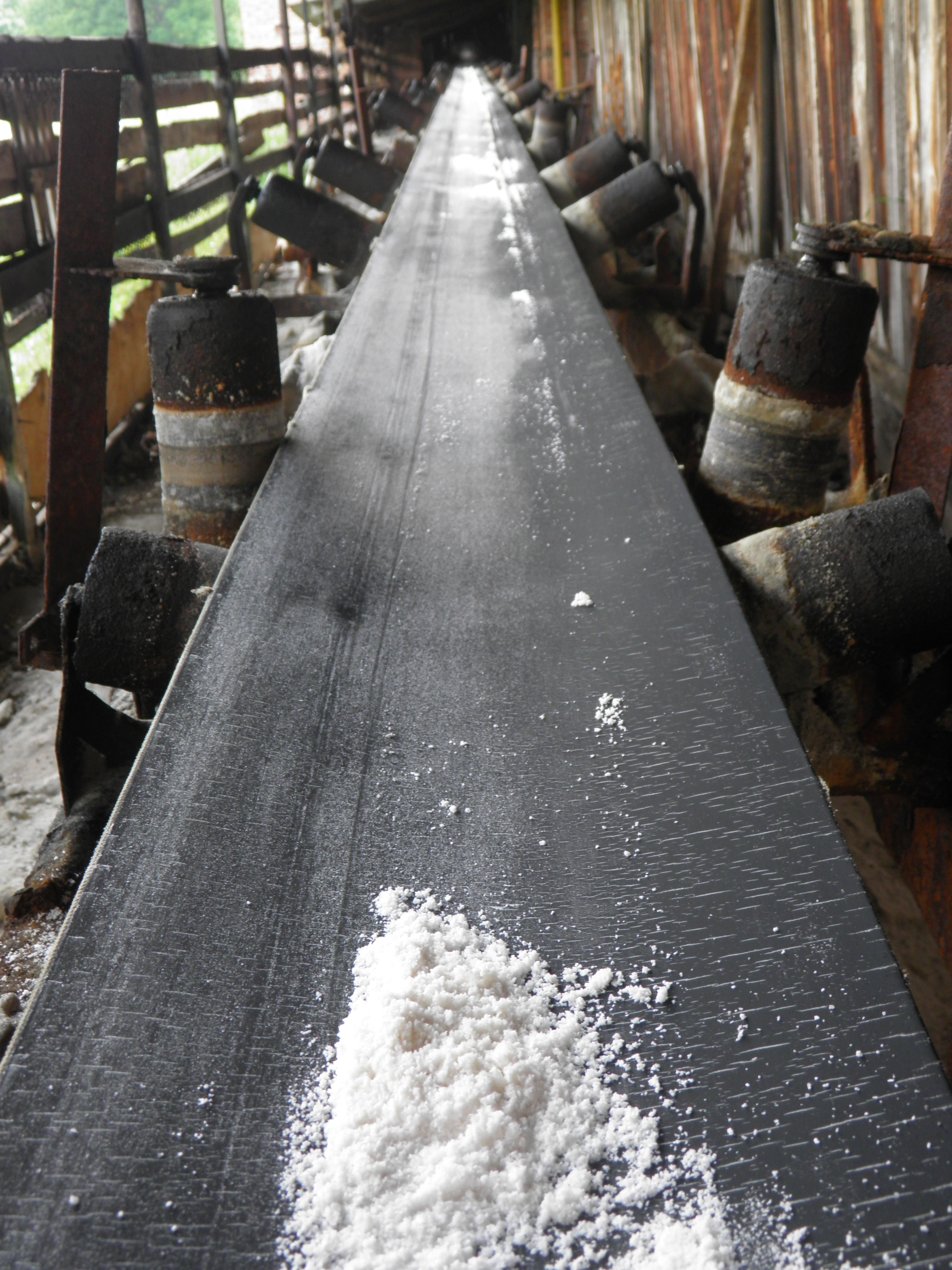
Salt conveyor

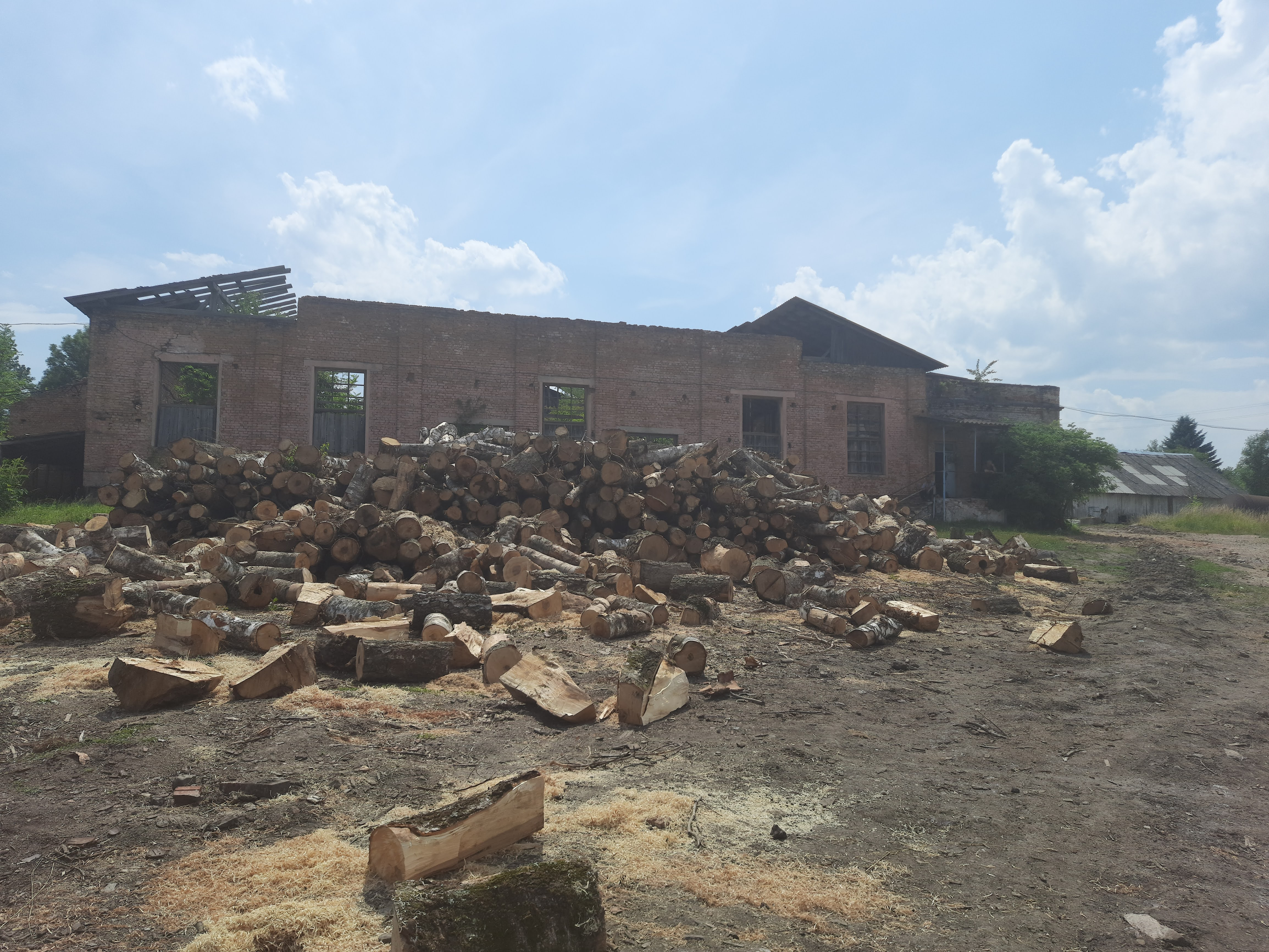
Saltworks number 2 (ruined)

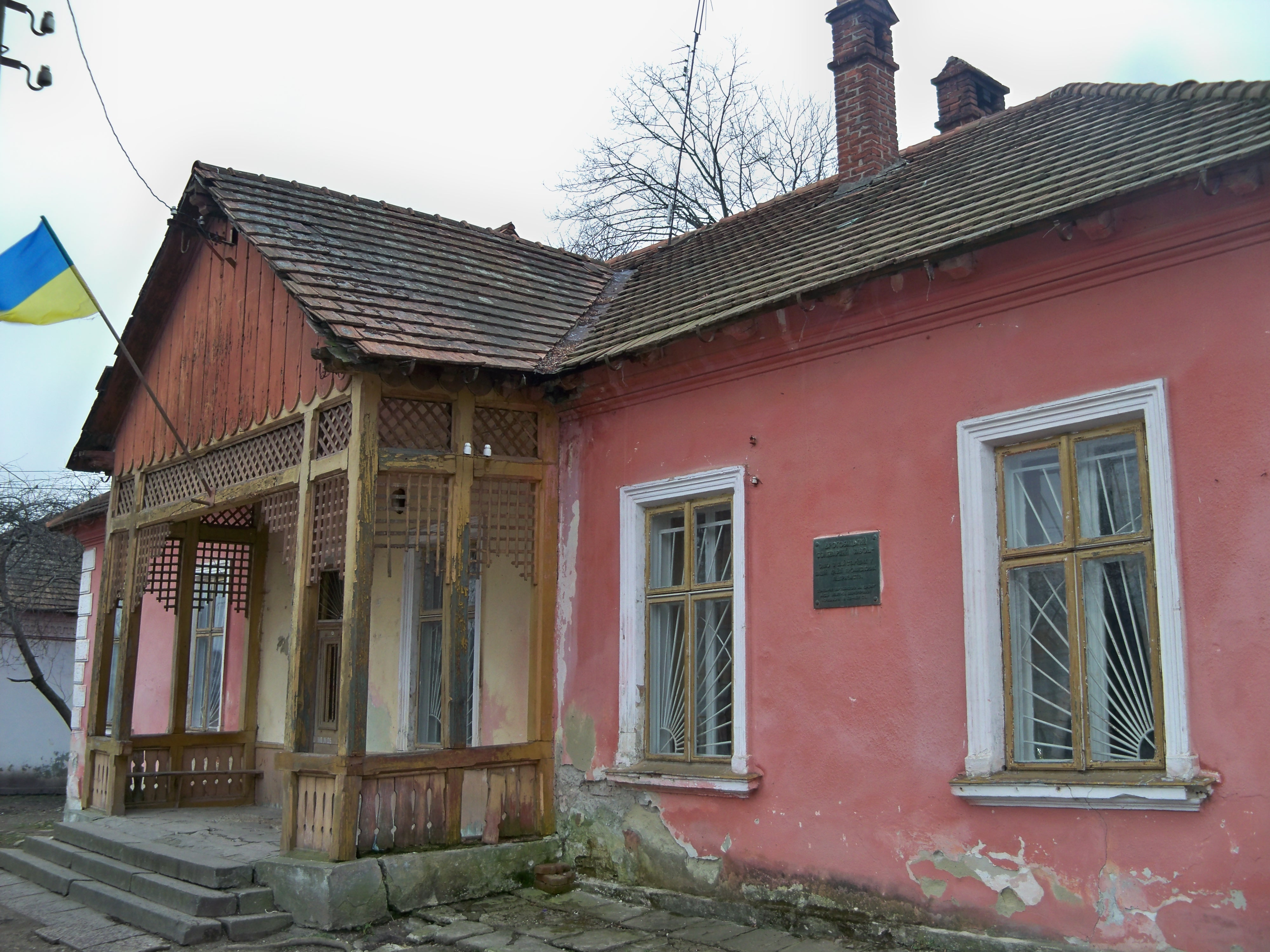
Administration building

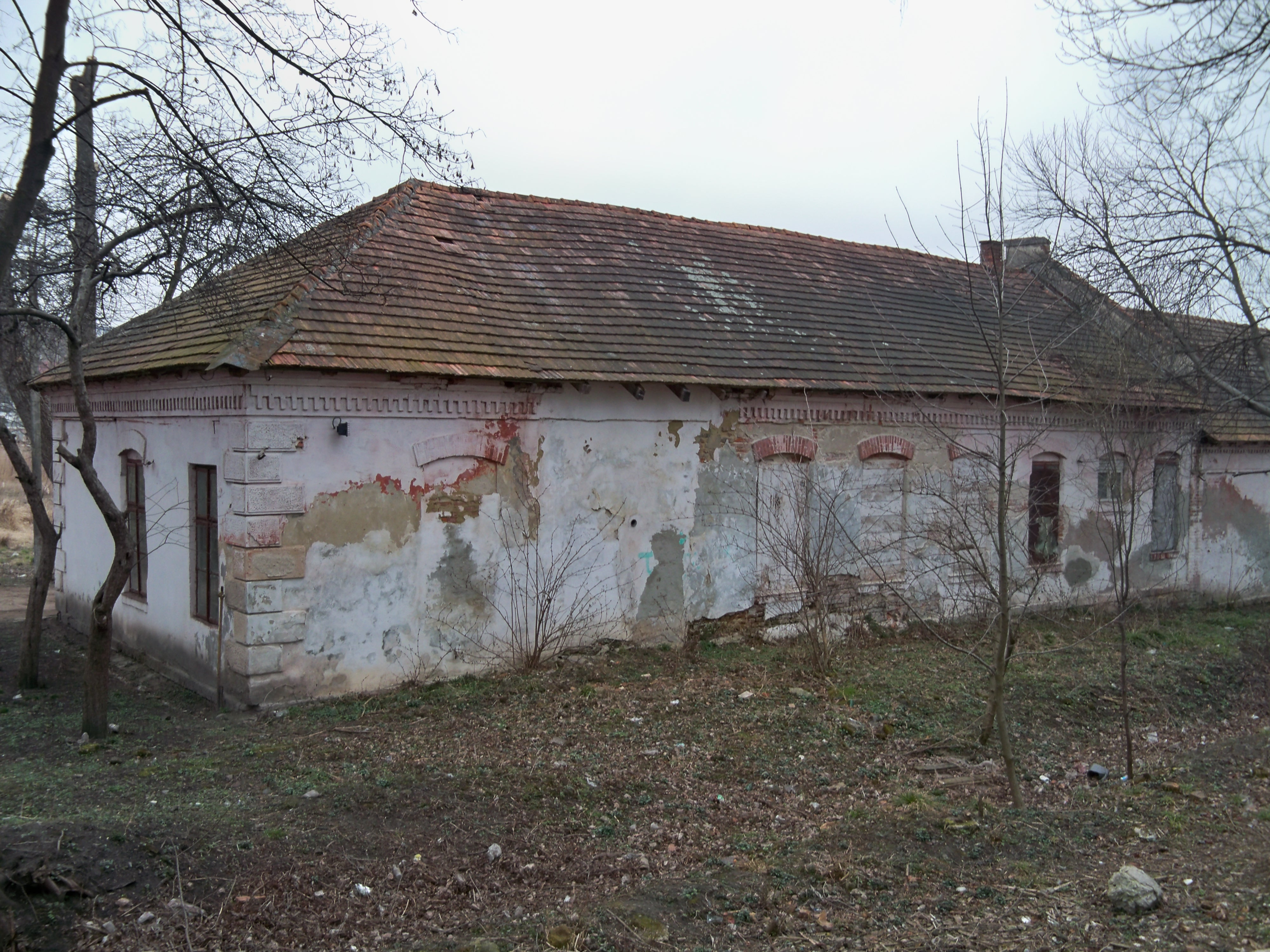
Storehouses

== Sources ==
- http://www.pavliv.if.ua/?m0prm=9&ShowProductId=4&m1prm=23&show=447
- http://minagro.gov.ua/node/17280
