= Zhydachiv Raion =

Former subdivision of Lviv Oblast, Ukraine

Zhydachiv Raion Жидачівський район
- Raion
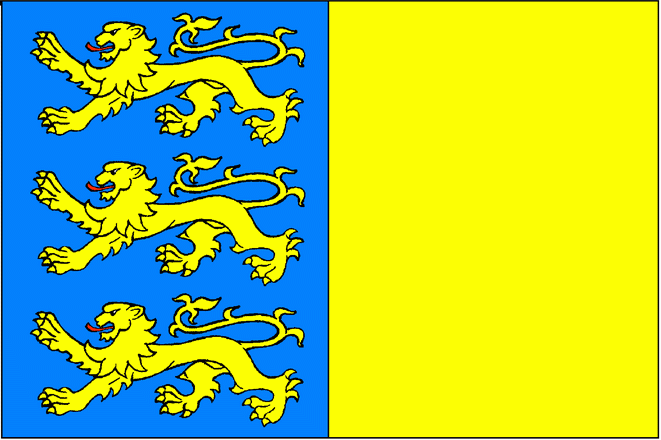
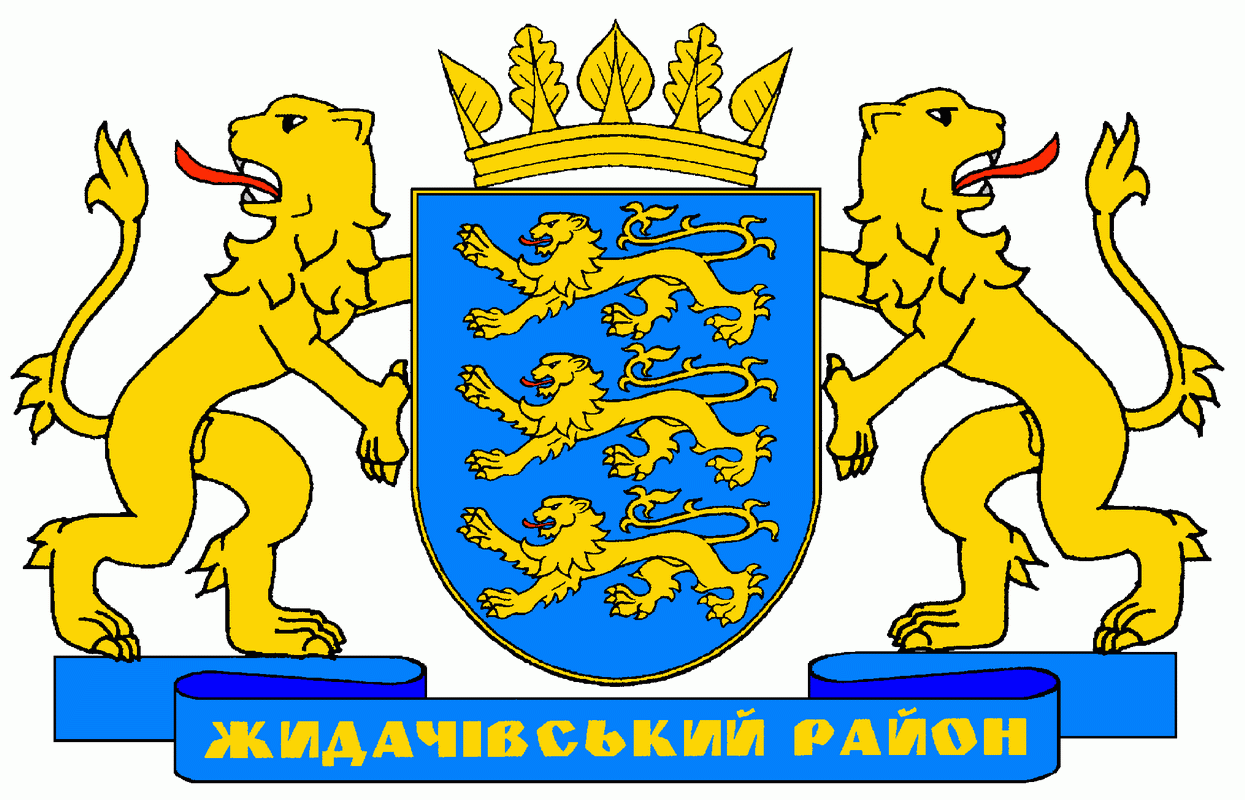
- Flag Coat of arms

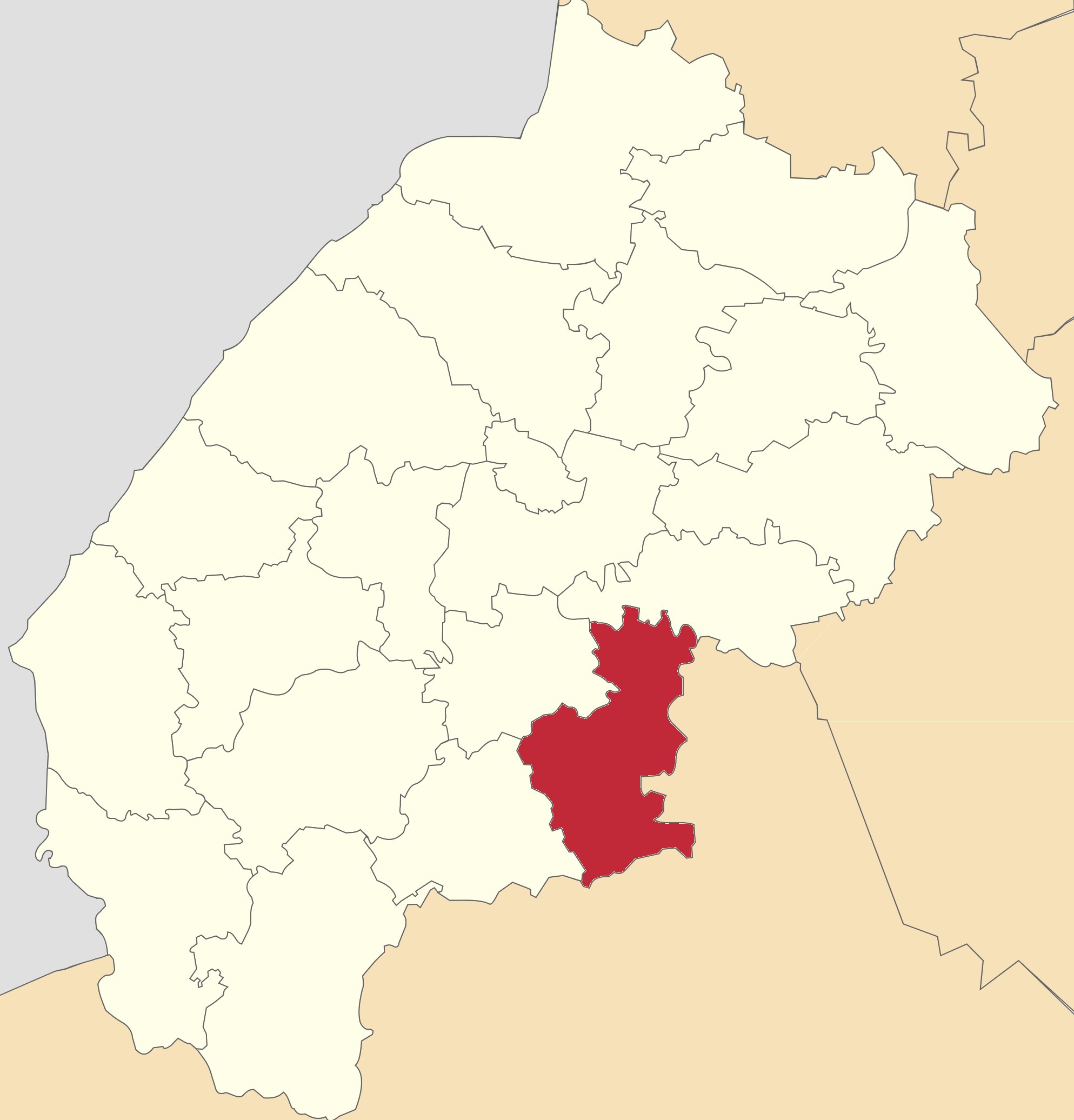
- Coordinates: 49°21′35″N 24°14′19″E
- Country: Ukraine
- Region: Lviv Oblast
- Established: 1939
- Disestablished: 18 July 2020
- Admin. center: Zhydachiv
- Subdivisions: List: — city councils; — settlement councils; — rural councils; Number of localities: — cities; — urban-type settlements; 113 — villages; — rural settlements

Area
  - Total: 996 km^{2} (385 sq mi)

Population (2020)
  - Total: 65,186
  - Density: 65.4/km^{2} (170/sq mi)
- Time zone: UTC+02:00 (EET)
  - Summer (DST): UTC+03:00 (EEST)
- Postal index: 81700—81798
- Area code: 380-3239

Zhydachiv Raion (Ukrainian: Жидачівський район) was a raion (district) in Lviv Oblast in western Ukraine. Its administrative center was the city of Zhydachiv. The raion was abolished on 18 July 2020 as part of the administrative reform of Ukraine, which reduced the number of raions of Lviv Oblast to seven. The area of Zhydachiv Raion was merged into Stryi Raion. The last estimate of the raion population was 65,186 (2020 est.).

It was established in 1939.

At the time of disestablishment, the raion consisted of four hromadas:

- Hnizdychiv settlement hromada with the administration in the urban-type settlement of Hnizdychiv;
- Khodoriv urban hromada with the administration in the city of Khodoriv;
- Zhuravne settlement hromada with the administration in the urban-type settlement of Zhuravne;
- Zhydachiv urban hromada with the administration in Zhydachiv.

== Settlements ==
Cities

- Khodoriv
- Zhydachiv

Urban-type settlements:

- Hnizdychiv
- Novi Strilyshcha
- Zhuravne

Villages (some):

- Makhlynets
- Oblaznytsia
- Trybokivtsi

== See also ==
- Administrative divisions of Lviv Oblast
