= Hnizdychiv =

Rural locality in Lviv Oblast, Ukraine

Hnizdychiv Гніздичів
- Rural settlement
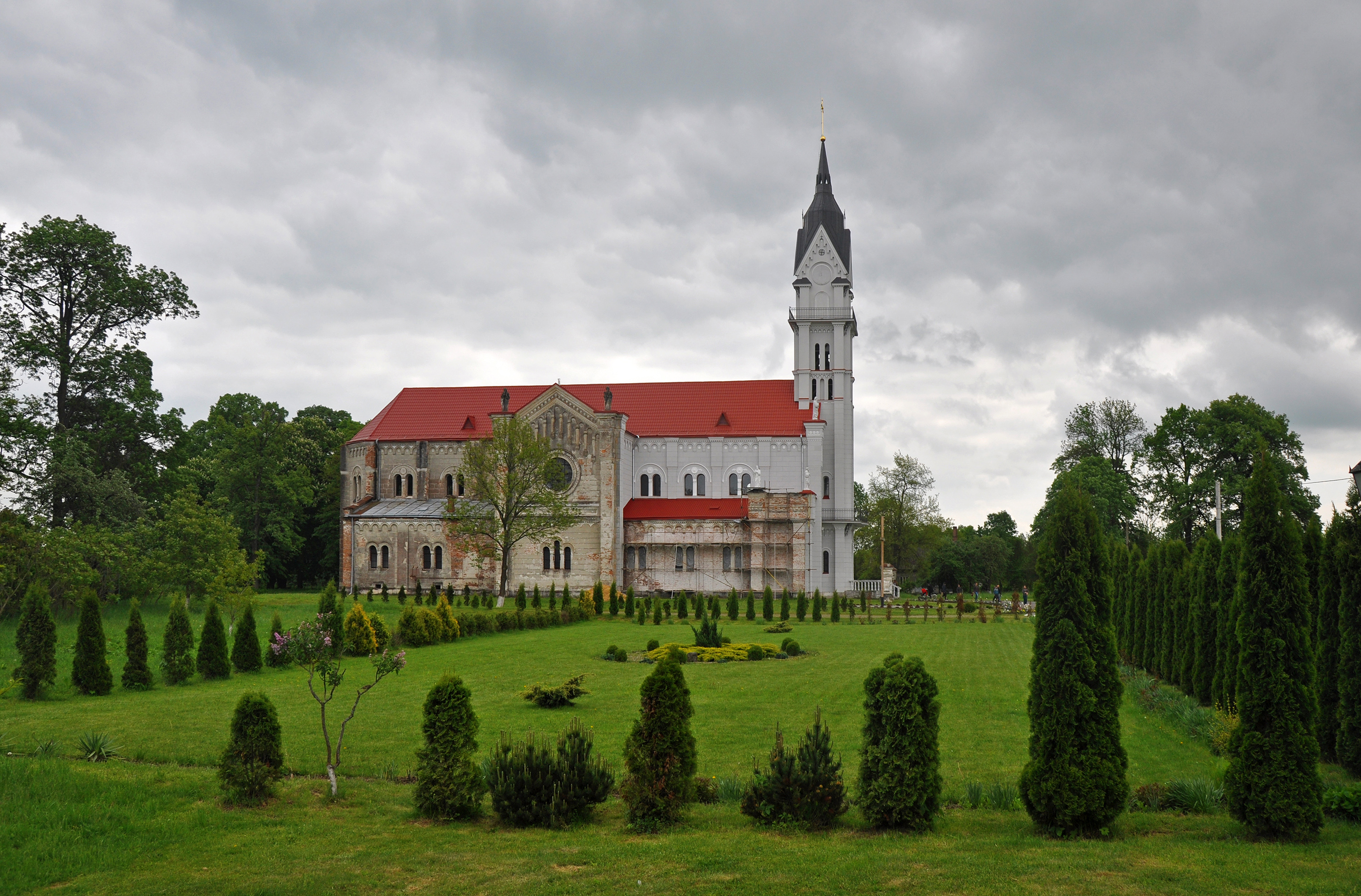
- Hnizdychiv Catholic Church

- Coat of arms

- Location in Lviv Oblast
- Coordinates: 49°20′14″N 24°06′19″E
- Country: Ukraine
- Oblast: Lviv Oblast
- Raion: Stryi Raion
- Hromada: Hnizdychiv settlement hromada
- Area: 5.76 km^{2} (2.22 sq mi)
- Population (2022): 3,983
  - Density: 691/km^{2} (1,790/sq mi)

Hnizdychiv (Ukrainian: Гніздичів) is a rural settlement in Stryi Raion, Lviv Oblast, Ukraine. It lies on the right bank of the Stryi River, 4 kilometres (2.5 mi) south of Zhydachiv. Hnizdychiv hosts the administration of Hnizdychiv settlement hromada, one of the hromadas of Ukraine. Population: 3,983 (2022 estimate). 3,823 (2025 estimate).

== History ==
Until 18 July 2020, Hnizdychiv belonged to Zhydachiv Raion. The raion was abolished in July 2020 as part of the administrative reform of Ukraine, which reduced the number of raions of Lviv Oblast to seven. The area of Zhydachiv Raion was merged into Stryi Raion.

Until 26 January 2024, Hnizdychiv was designated urban-type settlement. On this day, a new law entered into force which abolished this status, and Hnizdychiv became a rural settlement.

Hnizdychiv contains Saint Gerard Catholic Church.
