= Khodoriv =

City in Lviv Oblast, Ukraine

Khodoriv Ходорів
- City
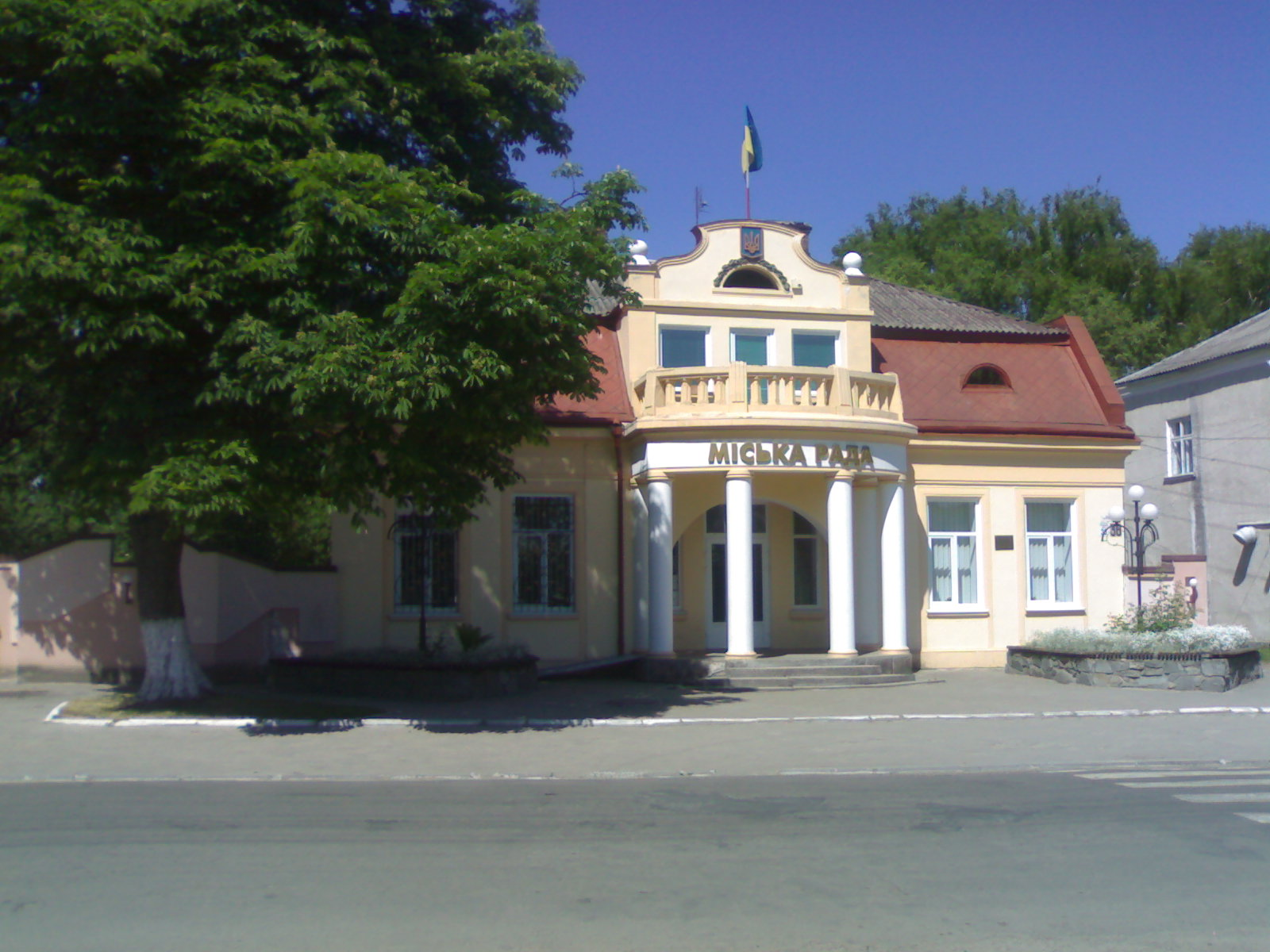
- City Hall

- Flag Coat of arms

- Location in Ukraine Khodoriv (Lviv Oblast)
- Country: Ukraine
- Oblast: Lviv Oblast
- Raion: Stryi Raion
- Hromada: Khodoriv urban hromada
- First mentioned: 1394
- City rights: ca. 15th century

Area
  - Total: 8.25 km^{2} (3.19 sq mi)

Population (2022)
  - Total: 8,954
  - Density: 1,090/km^{2} (2,810/sq mi)
- Postal code: 81750—81753
- Area code: +380-3239

Khodoriv (Ukrainian: Ходорів, IPA: [ˈxɔdor⁽ʲ⁾iu̯]; Polish: Chodorów) is a city in Stryi Raion, Lviv Oblast, western Ukraine. It hosts the administration of Khodoriv urban hromada, one of the hromadas of Ukraine. Its population is approximately 8,954 (2022 estimate).

== History ==
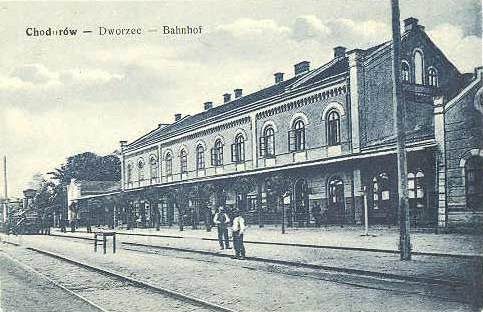
Train station in the early 20th century

The city was first mentioned in 1394. In many historic documents it is referred to as Khodoriv-stav. In many documents it is named Khodoriv-stav. This is connected with the Khodorivsky family and the location of the city above a large lake. In the 15th century, Khodoriv was granted city status and a coat of arms.

Historical population
Year	Pop.	±%
1921	4,206	—
1931	7,646	+81.8%
2022	8,954	+17.1%

Following the joint German-Soviet invasion of Poland, which started World War II in September 1939, the town was occupied by the Soviet Union until 1941, then by Germany until 1944, and re-occupied by the Soviet Union, which annexed it from Poland in 1945. The Jewish population of Chodorów amounted to around 2,500 at the beginning of the German occupation of the town in July 1941. Immediately, the Germans and their Ukrainian collaborators robbed and abused Jews and burned down the Great Synagogue. In June 1942, the first Aktion rounded up about 1,000 to 1,500 Jews. Those who were sick and weak were shot in Khodoriv, others were sent to Belzec where they were immediately murdered. A similar Aktion took place in October, with 350 Jews deported to Belzec to be murdered. After that about 800 Jews were left in the town. In February 1943, the Ukrainian police murdered the rest near the local sugar plant. Only 15 or so of the town's Jews survived, mostly hidden with friends and acquaintances. Ten had been hidden by Henryk Piczek in his cellar for 22 months.

The historic wooden synagogue of Chodorow, built in 1652 and featuring a beautifully painted interior, was burned but a model of the ceiling has been reconstructed at the Museum of the Jewish People (Beth Hatefutsoth) in Tel Aviv, Israel. See Yad Vashem's web site on the synagogue.

Khodoriv was one of the major industrial hubs in Zhydachiv Raion and Lviv Oblast, with more than 10 manufacturing and other plants including the Sugar Plant and the Plant of Manufacturing Polygraph Machines. Within the city, there are three secondary education schools and two colleges. The city also has some monuments of architecture, including the St. Michael's Church. In addition, new church will rise in early 2000s, designed by Oleksandr Matviiv. Khodoriv has always been a big railroad hub in the region.

Until 18 July 2020, Khodoriv belonged to Zhydachiv Raion. The raion was abolished in July 2020 as part of the administrative reform of Ukraine, which reduced the number of raions of Lviv Oblast to seven. The area of Zhydachiv Raion was merged into Stryi Raion.

== Notable people ==
- Oswald Balzer — Polish historian
- Maria Bartlowa — Polish activist, senator of the Second Polish Republic, wife of Prime Minister Kazimierz Bartel
- Rabbi Yehoshia Heshl Eichenstein of Khodorov, son of Rabbi Alexander Yom Tov Lipa of Zidichov
- Rabbi Yisochor Berish Eichenstein of Khodorov (d. 1918), son of Rabbi Yehoshia Heshl of Khodorov
- Yitzhak Golan (born Yitzhak Goldstein) — Israeli politician who served as a member of the Knesset
- Ihor Kalynets — Ukrainian poet and Soviet dissident
- Blessed Tarsykiya Matskiv — Ukrainian Greek Catholic nun and martyr
- Zdzislaw Trojanowski — Polish ice-hockey player, who participated in the 1952 Winter Olympics
