= Tarsykiya Matskiv =

Ukrainian Greek Catholic nun and martyr

Blessed Tarsykiya Matskiv SSMI
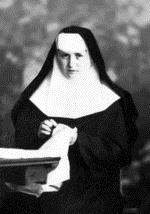
- Born: Olha Matskiv; March 23, 1919; Chodorów, Lwów Voivodeship, Second Polish Republic (now Khodoriv, Ukraine)
- Died: July 17, 1944 (aged 25); Chervonohrad, Ukrainian SSR, Soviet Union
- Cause of death: gunshot wound

Olha Matskiv (Ukrainian: Ольга Мацьків, Polish: Olga Maćkiw), better known by her religious name, Tarsykiya or Tarsykia (Ukrainian: Тарсикія, Polish: Tarsycja; 23 March 1919 – 17 July 1944), was a Ukrainian Greek Catholic nun and martyr.

Matskiv was born in Chodorów, Second Polish Republic (now Khodoriv, Ukraine). She entered the Sisters Servants of Mary Immaculate on 3 May 1938. She took her first vows on 5 November 1940, and worked in her convent, sewing clothes for the sisters and teaching others the skill. Even before the arrival of the Soviet Army to Lviv, she took vows before her spiritual director, Volodymyr Kovalyk, that she would give up her life for the conversion of Russia and for the Catholic Church.

On 17 July 1944 around 8 am, a Russian soldier rang the convent door. When Matskiv answered the door, expecting to see a priest who was supposed to celebrate the liturgy, she was shot without warning and died. It was later said that she was shot simply "because she was a nun".

She was beatified by Pope John Paul II on 27 June 2001.

== Quote ==
"Suddenly the bell rang. We thought it was the priest. Sister Tarsykiia opened the door, asked Sister Maria for the key to the front door and went to the main entrance. Then a shot rang out and Sister Tarsykiia fell down dead. The soldier who shot her dead did not really explain why he did it. Later they said that he said he killed her because she was a nun." - From the testimony of Sister Daria Hradiuk.
