= Oblaznytsia =

Rural locality in Lviv Oblast, Ukraine

- Village
- Seal

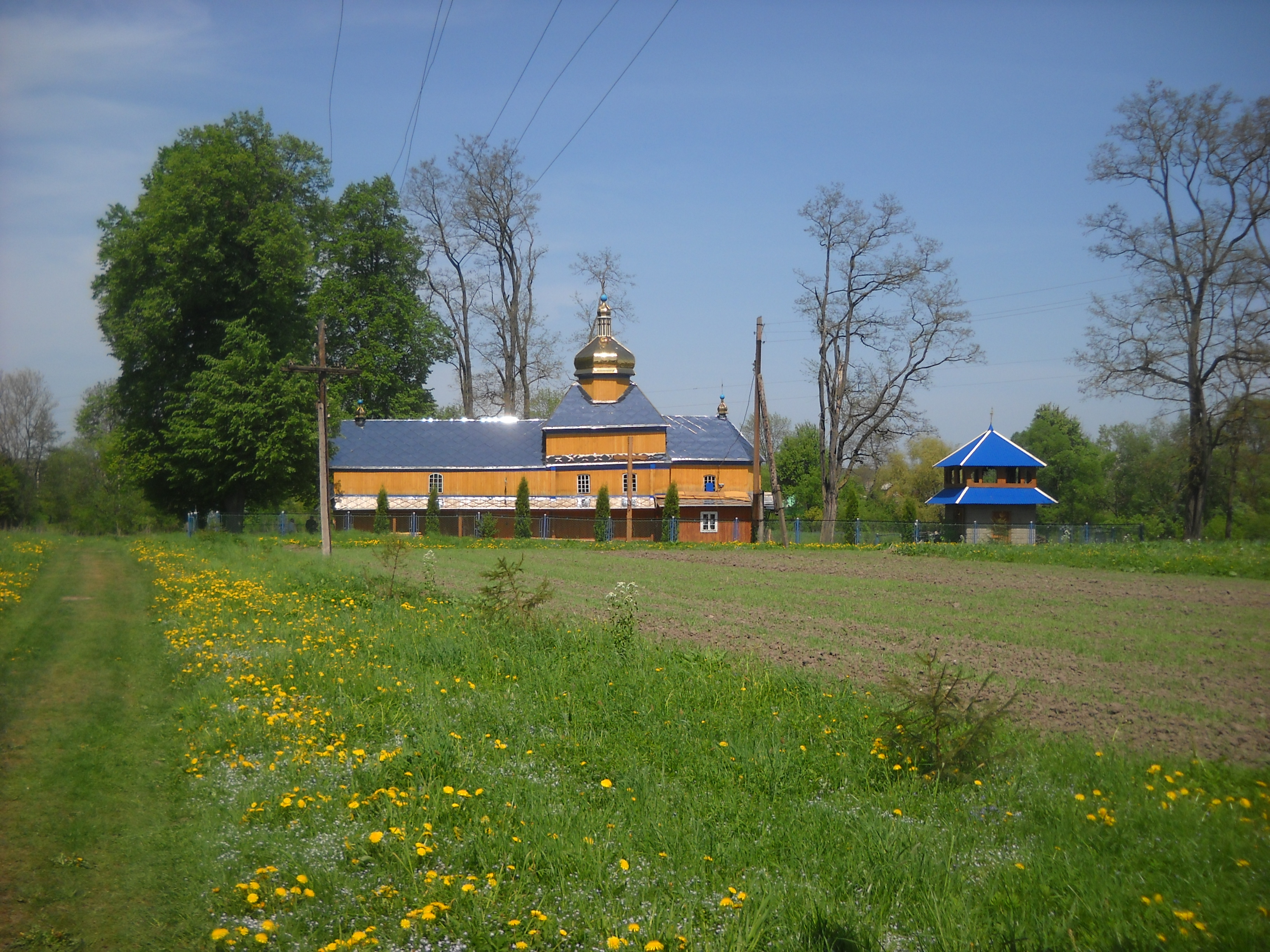
- Coordinates: 49°16′12″N 24°7′49″E
- Country: Ukraine
- Oblast: Lviv Oblast
- Raion: Stryi Raion
- Hromada: Hnizdychiv settlement hromada
- Area: 1.412 km^{2} (0.545 sq mi)
- Elevation: 269 m (883 ft)
- Population: 288
  - Density: 204/km^{2} (530/sq mi)

Oblaznytsia (Ukrainian: Облазниця) is a village (selo) in Stryi Raion, Lviv Oblast, in western Ukraine. It belongs to Hnizdychiv settlement hromada, one of the hromadas of Ukraine. The first mention of the village dates back to 1411. There is a wooden church of St. Eustachian in village, built in the 17th century (rebuilt in 1930), once visited by Hetman Ivan Vyhovsky with his wife Elena and Metropolitan Bishop Andrey Sheptytsky.

== History ==
The first mention of the village dates back to 1411. It is in Fedor Lubartowicz's charter that confirmed the sentence boundary dispute over Oblaznytsia.

During the Polish Republic (1918–1939) village was part of Stanisławów Voivodeship. Villagers were members of the national liberation struggle of 1918-20, fought on the fronts of World War II, participated in the armed struggle against the Soviet and German occupiers.

Until 18 July 2020, Oblaznytsia belonged to Zhydachiv Raion. The raion was abolished in July 2020 as part of the administrative reform of Ukraine, which reduced the number of raions of Lviv Oblast to seven. The area of Zhydachiv Raion was merged into Stryi Raion.

== Demography ==
Historical population
| Year | 1880 | 1909 | 1935 | 1971 | 2001 |
| Pop. | 445 | 735 | 702 | 511 | 288 |
| ±% | — | +65.2% | −4.5% | −27.2% | −43.6% |
Source: Matviyiv Orest. My Village on Liybeshka River. Drohobych. «Posvit», - 2011.

== Local government ==
Local government is represented by Oblaznytsia selsoviet, led by Stanislav Striyskiy. Most MPs are members of political party All-Ukrainian Union "Fatherland".

== Sources ==
- Матвіїв, Орест (2011). Моє село над Любешкою-рікою. Дрогобич: Посвіт. ISBN 978-966-2248-92-0.
- (in Ukrainian)
