= Yulian-Yurii Dorosh =

Ukrainian photographer and cinematographer (1909–1982)

- Юліан-Юрій Омелянович Дорош
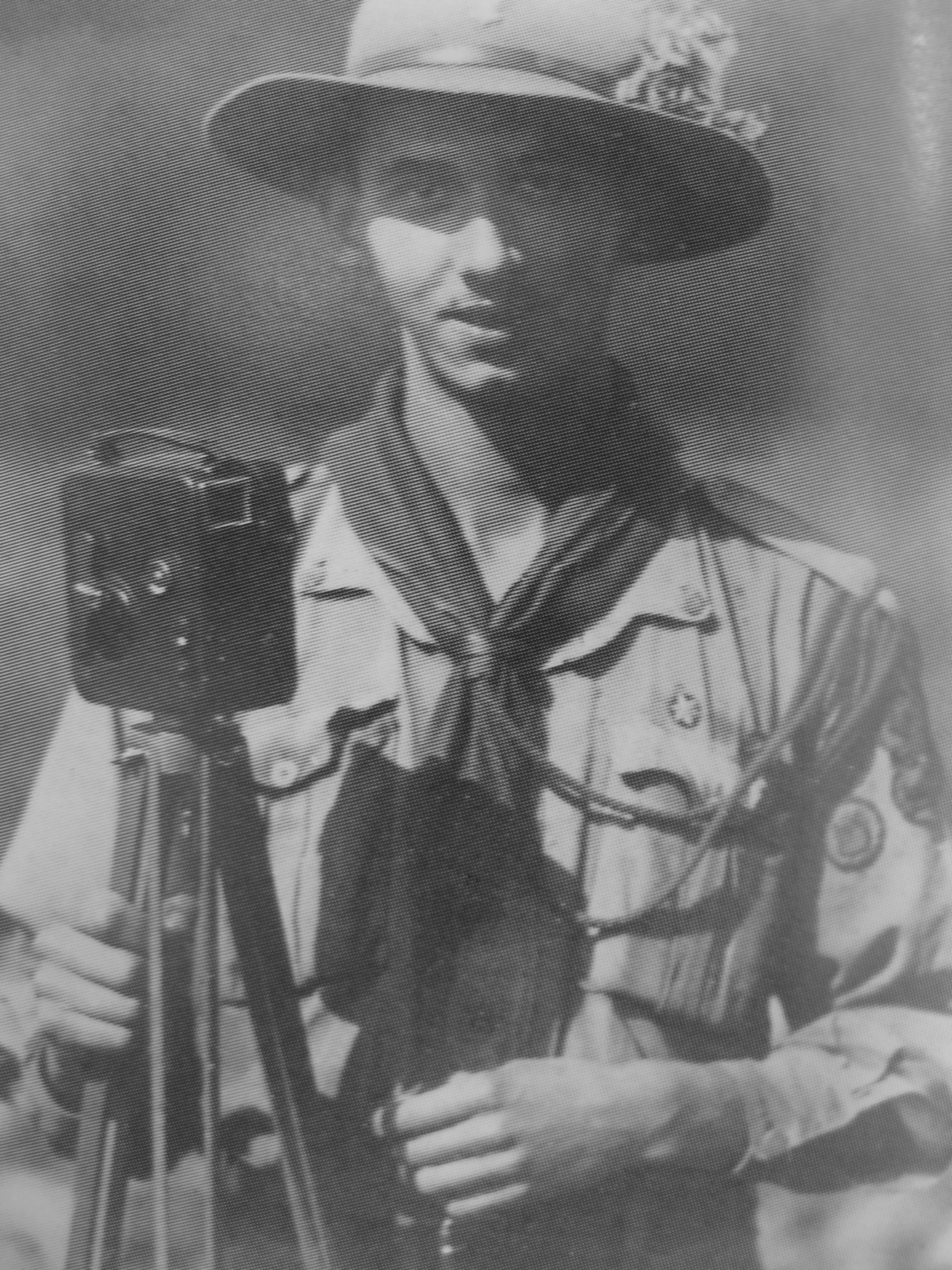
- Y. Dorosh. Lviv, 1929
- Born: 9 June 1909; Zhydachiv, Austria-Hungary (now Ukraine)
- Died: 20 July 1982 (aged 73); Lviv
- Other name: University of Lviv
- Occupations: Photographer-artist, cinematographer, ethnographer, local historian

Yulian-Yurii Dorosh (Ukrainian: Юліан-Юрій Омелянович Дорош; 9 June 1909 – 20 July 1982) was a Ukrainian photographer-artist, pioneer of Ukrainian cinematography in Galicia, ethnographer, local historian. Member of the Ukrainian Photographic Society.

== Biography ==
Yulian Dorosh was born on 9 June 1909 in the family of an Austrian customs officer in Zhydachiv. Later, his father was transferred to the Ternopil Oblast, and Yulian spent his childhood in Kopychyntsi. In the early 1920s, the Dorosh family settled in Stanyslaviv, where Yulian graduated from a Ukrainian gymnasium. There he joined Plast, where he first picked up a camera. From that time on, Dorosh had been keeping a photo chronicle of Plast camps. Dorosh belonged to the 11th kurin named after Ivan Mazepa, and later became a member of the 15th kurin of the Order of the Iron Ostroha, becoming its Grand Chancellor and wagoner of the traveling and permanent kurin camp in the summer of 1930. Member of the OPC Lviv (1929), sub-referent of photographs of the economic essay of the Supreme Plast Team (1928-1930), awarded a letter of commendation (1930).

In 1927-1932 he studied at the Law Faculty of the University of Lviv. Yulian Dorosh's life was connected with Vynnyky. Here, in the family of his uncle, writer and teacher Antin Krushelnytskyi, Yulian Dorosh lived while studying at the Law Faculty of the University of Lviv along with his cousins Ivan and Taras, the writer's sons. At the time, Krushelnytskyi published the "Novi Shliakhy" magazine, which brought together Ukrainian poets, avant-garde artists, critics, and architects. This period had a significant impact on Dorosh's worldview and future work. From that time on, he began his regular collaboration with many Ukrainian publications in Lviv ("Dni", "Zhyttia i Znannia", "Kino", "Svitlo i Tin" and "Ukrainski Visti"), and he also wrote amateur photography columns in the Plast magazines "Vohni" and "Molode Zhyttia", as well as in the newspaper "Nedilia", where he was a co-editor.

After the Krushelnytskyi family had left for Soviet Ukraine, Dorosh had problems with housing and employment. His friends offered him a job as a photographer and translator at the Warsaw-based scientific Society of Hutsul Supporters, which annually collected ethnographic material in the Carpathians. It was the materials collected during his work at the Society that formed the basis of the exhibition "Our Motherland in Photos" (1935), organized by the Ukrainian Photographic Society in Lviv.

On the eve of the World War II, Yaroslav Pasternak, who knew Dorosh from his time at the Ukrainian Photographic Society, conducted archaeological excavations in princely Halych (Krylos), which Dorosh photographed at his invitation.

In 1939, Dorosh, along with Oleksandr Dovzhenko and Vasyl Sofroniv-Levytskyi, traveled to the Carpathian villages of Kosiv, Kuty and Kryvorivnia. In Zhabie, they filmed a Hutsul wedding with a married couple, horses, pistols, and shooting.

The war years were unproductive for him, and he barely took a few family photos.

In 1946, a new period in the life of the master began, marked by a number of creative achievements. In 1956-1965, Dorosh worked as a photographer at the Department of Archeology of the Institute of Social Sciences of the Academy of Sciences of Ukrainian SSR. He participated in archaeological expeditions of the Institute. His photographs were published in works on archeology, ethnography, folk art, and exhibited at three personal exhibitions. He got a job as a photographer at the Lviv Historical Museum, worked at the Department of History of Technology at the Lviv Polytechnic Institute, and was one of the first in Lviv to master the technique of color photography.

In 1956, at the suggestion of Ivan Krypiakevych, Dorosh organized a photographic laboratory at the Department of Archeology of the Institute of Social Sciences of the Academy of Sciences of Ukrainian SSR, where he printed illustrations for guidebooks, albums, and books ("Historical Walks in Lviv", etc.).

== Creative work ==
=== Most famous photos ===
Dorosh's first success as a photographer was an album titled "Sub-abstract of photographs at the Economic Abstract of the V.P.K. in Lviv", dated 1928. It contains 44 photographs illustrating the Congress of Plast members on 30 June 1928, the women's and novice camps in Pidliutne, the senior plast camp on Sokil and a general view of Sokil in the same year, and a water camp on the Dniester.

=== Films ===
- 1929 - "Sviato Molodi" (a documentary about the life of Plast).
- 1933 - documentary film "Rakovets".
- 1938 - "Do Dobra i Krasy" - the first Ukrainian feature film in Western Ukraine, shot in the Horodenkivshchyna and Kopychyntsi at the expense of the Central Union and the Society of Ukrainian Cooperators. In its content, it was a commercial representing Ukrainian Galician products. The script was written by Vasyl Sofroniv-Levytskyi and Roman Kupchynskyi. The film starred Andrii Polishchuk, a soloist at the Lviv Opera House from Volyn, and Marichka Sofiian-Lozynska, a member of an amateur theater from Kopychyntsi. Photo-Film Studio.
- 1938 - a documentary about the funeral of the Ukrainian Insurgent Army commander, General Myron Tarnavskyi. Later, the film was honored with an entry in the book "History of Ukrainian Cinema" by Liubomyr Hoseiko, published in France in 2001.
- 1939 - The unfinished film "Krylos" is a historical story about the twelfth century, inspired by the excavations of a church in Halych. Yulian Dorosh began filming a color film about the life of twelfth-century Ukraine-Rus' (working title "Krylos"), the script for which was written by Volodymyr Sofroniv-Levytskyi, and art historian and artist Iryna Hurhula designed the clothes for the film's characters on the instructions of Yaroslav Pasternak. A singer from Volyn, Andrii Polishchuk, and an amateur singer from Kopychyntsi, Mariia Safiianivna (Marichka Sofiian-Lozynska), were invited to play the leading roles. The film was shot in the summer of 1939 in the Metropolitan Gardens of St. George's Cathedral in Lviv.
- 1971 - "Bilia Dzherel Narodnoi Tvorchosti" is a documentary silent black-and-white film made in 1965-1971 in the Hutsul region on 16 mm film. The film was accidentally discovered in 2020. The film was digitized in March–April 2020 and published online. This is probably Dorosh's last painting.

=== Solo exhibitions ===
- 1957 - Yulian Dorosh's first solo exhibition of ethnographic photography at the Museum of Ethnography and Art Crafts in Lviv.
- 1972 - the third personal exhibition of Dorosh's works in the Ivano-Frankivsk Local Museum.
- 1973 - the fourth personal exhibition (a repetition of the previous exhibition) of Yurii Dorosh's works in the Volodymyr Hnatiuk Ethnographic and Memorial Museum (Velesniv, Chortkiv Raion, Ternopil Oblast).

=== Participation in photo exhibitions ===
- 1933 - photo exhibition in the Ukrainian Pavilion at the World Exhibition "The 1933 Century of Progress", Chicago, (USA), where he exhibited his most famous photo "Viialnytsia".
- 1935 - photo exhibition "Nasha Batkivshchyna v svitlyni", Lviv (organized by the Ukrainian Photographic Society). First place and fame as a master of ethnographic photography for a series of photos from the life of the Hutsul and Pokuttia regions.

=== Books and publications ===
- Book "Pidruchnyk fotoamatora" (1931, Lviv).
- Book "Pobilshennia" (Lviv).
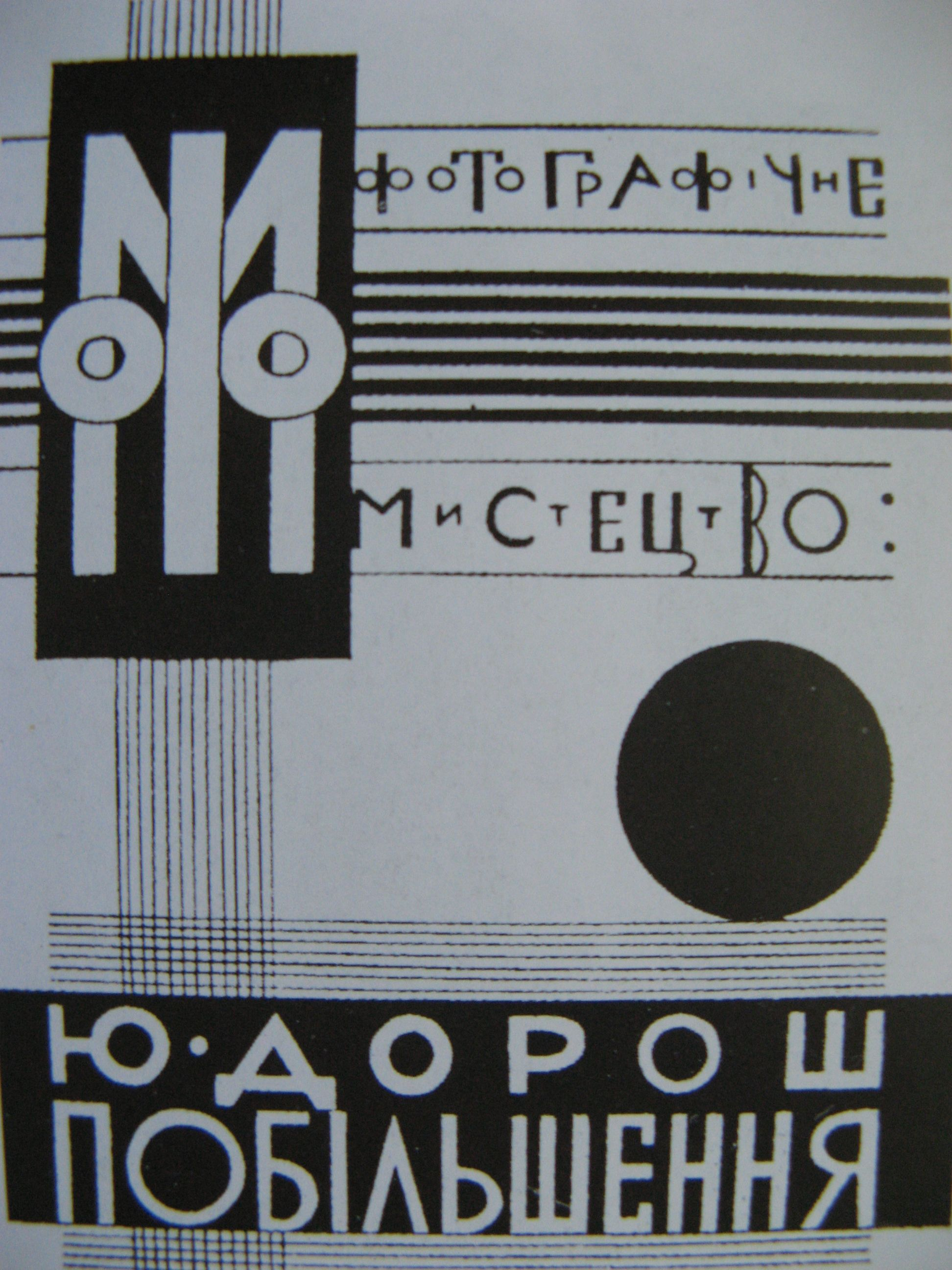
Book "Pobilshennia" (Lviv)

== Legacy ==
A street in Lviv was named in honor of Yulian Dorosh in 1993.

The residence of Dorosh family in Lviv has been transferred to the Vynnyky local history museum. An exhibition dedicated to Dorosh and his works is planned to be opened at the location in June 2026.

== Bibliography ==
- Dorosh Yulian Omelianovych / Y. O. Biriulov, A. Y. Dorosh // Encyclopedia of Modern Ukraine [Online] / Eds. : I. М. Dziuba, A. I. Zhukovsky, M. H. Zhelezniak [et al.] ; National Academy of Sciences of Ukraine, Shevchenko Scientific Society. – Kyiv : The NASU institute of Encyclopedic Research, 2008.
- Львів середини 20 століття у фотографіях Юліана Дороша // Галицька брама. — 2006. — № 7—8.
- Гнатюк Михайло (27 серпня 2008). Народне мистецтво Покуття і Гуцульщини у світлинах Юліана Дороша. ozo.org.ua. Пластовий курінь Орден Залізної Остроги.
- Левкун Ярослав (2 березня 2007). Галичина. Перший галицький фільм. history.iv-fr.net. Історичне Прикарпаття.
- Андрій Дорош (19 листопада 2009). Юліан Дорош — 100 років з дня народження. photospilka.com. Національна спілка фотохудожників України.
- Портах Мар'яна (20 квітня 2016). Хто такі українські фотохудожники?. photography.in.ua. Українська фотографія.
- Байцар А. Видатні винниківчани. Науково-краєзнавче видання / А. Л. Байцар. — Львів—Винники, 2012. — 88 с.
- Байцар А. Винники туристичні. Науково-краєзнавче видання / А. Л. Байцар. — Винники : Друксервіс, 2016. — 312 с.
- Байцар А. Історія Винник в особах. Науково-краєзнавче видання / А. Л. Байцар. — Винники; Львів : ЗУКЦ, 2017. — 180 с.
- Крушельницька Л. І. Рубали ліс (Спогади галичанки). — Львів : Львівська національна наукова бібліотека України імені Василя Стефаника НАН України, 2001. — 260 с. — ISBN 966-02-1429-4.
- Dawna fotografia lwowska 1839—1939 / Zakowicz A., Biriulow Ju., Simonienko S. — Lwow: Centrum Europy, 2004. — 368 s. — ISBN 966-7022-55-2.
