= Zdzisław Trojanowski =

Polish ice hockey player

- Born: May 27, 1928; Chodorów, Poland
- Died: March 20, 2006 (aged 77); Opole, Poland
- Position: Left wing
- Played for: Legia Warsaw
- National team: Poland
- Playing career: 1948–1962

Zdzisław Jan Trojanowski (27 May 1928 – 20 March 2006) was a Polish ice hockey winger. He played for Legia Warsaw and was a member of the Polish national team at the 1952 Winter Olympics.
