= Makhlynets =

Rural locality in Lviv Oblast, Ukraine

- Village
- Location within Lviv Oblast
- Coordinates: 49°14′35″N 24°21′18″E
- Country: Ukraine
- Oblast: Lviv
- Raion: Stryi
- Area: 0.444 km^{2} (0.171 sq mi)
- Population: 122
  - Density: 275/km^{2} (712/sq mi)

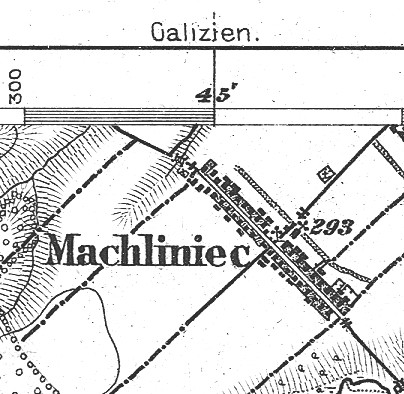
Village of Machliniec from 1877 Bolechow map

Makhlynets (Ukrainian: Махлинець, Polish and German Machliniec) is a village in Stryi Raion, Lviv Oblast, Ukraine. It belongs to Hnizdychiv settlement hromada, one of the hromadas of Ukraine. Makhlynets is located 16.8 km due east of Stryi, Ukraine.

== History ==
=== Founding ===
Machliniec was founded in 1823 by German-speaking settlers from the southern Egerland region of Bohemia, notably the parishes of Plan and Pfraumberg. The original settlers were attracted by a publicly distributed notice from the Lord of the Manor of Daszawa, Felix, Count of Dobrzanski, "He will reasonably sell a quantity of his best land to people who want to settle on his manor." The settlers cleared the land and established their own farms on it.

=== Austrian era, 1823–1918 ===
Machliniec was the principal village in what is known as the German language island of Machliniec. The language island comprised the following seven villages, followed by their respective populations in 1934:

- Machliniec 431
- Neudorf (Nowesiola) 473
- Kornelówka 235
- Drösseldorf (Wola Oblaznica) 203
- Kontrowers 170
- Lubsza 145
- Izydorówka 102

There were four other Bohemian-German language islands, or colonies, in eastern Galizien—Felizienthal, Ludwikówka, Pöchersdorf and Mariahilf.

In January 1837, the inhabitants of Machliniec petitioned for the construction of their own church. Dobrzanski provided only the clay for the foundation; the parishioners had to contribute the rest of the building material in addition to all the labour. The small wooden church, dedicated to the Most Holy Trinity, could hold 80 people and was completed in 1842.

On 19 August 1862 a new larger stone church was completed. Each landowner donated on average twenty-five Guilders in cash, thirty-seven cart-loads of material and six full days of labour towards construction.

Machliniec found itself in the middle of the eastern front during the First World War. The village was occupied by Russian troops in 1914 and many families fled south across the Carpathian Mountains toward Austria. The Austrians regained the territory in the summer of 1915, only to be pushed back again by Russian forces in their offensive of 1916—the colony of Mariahilf was completely burned down at this time.

=== Polish era, 1918-1939 ===
Following the dissolution of the Austro-Hungarian Empire at the end of 1918, the area around Machliniec suffered from further conflicts first in the Polish-Ukrainian War of 1918-1919, and then in the Polish-Soviet War of 1919-1921. Many people emigrated to North and South America at this time.

Under Polish rule, the people of Machliniec lost many of the freedoms they had enjoyed when they were part of Austria. Instruction in the German language was no longer permitted in public schools and lessons were conducted by independent teachers who moved from town to town, often under the watchful eye of the local authorities. An organisation known as the Association of German Catholics (V.d. K) was established in 1923 to promote cultural and social links between the isolated German settlements. When the Second World War broke out in September 1939, the Polish authorities jailed sixteen members of the V.d. K. from the Machliniec area. They were released a month later when Poland surrendered.

=== Population transfers ===
As per Article II of the secret protocol of the Molotov–Ribbentrop pact, all land to the east of the Narev, Vistula, and San rivers was to fall into the Soviet sphere of influence. As part of the Nazi-Soviet population transfers, all Volksdeutsche were to be granted German citizenship and resettled in Germany. In November 1939, Soviet and German officials arrived and prepared detailed lists of property and livestock which each family would have to leave behind. Each person was allowed to take a wagon with a limited amount of personal belongings and one team of horses.

"The women and children went by train in boxcars, in December 1939. The men, with their teams of horses, went in January 1940 first to Przemyśl (in present-day Poland) to cross the bridge over the San River towards Germany. It took us two days in that very cold winter to arrive at the bridge. Crossing the bridge was very strictly controlled by the Russians. After we crossed over the bridge, we were loaded on a train with the team of horses and travelled west towards Posen, Poland."
— Leo Merz 1988.

Many children and older people died from the bitter cold, or from typhus and other diseases that were prevalent in the cramped conditions of the resettlement camps. The inhabitants of Machliniec were resettled throughout the Polish areas annexed by Nazi Germany on farms that had been taken from Polish or Jewish families. Most of the men were conscripted into the German army and sent to the Eastern Front. In 1945, ahead of the advancing Red Army, the women and children were evacuated yet again.

=== 1940 to the present ===
Since 1940, Machliniec has been inhabited solely by ethnic Ukrainians. In 1990, descendants of the original settlers realized that the stone church was badly damaged and that the roof had caved in. Inside the church is a small metal plaque with the following words engraved in Ukrainian and German:

"The church was established in 1862 by German settlers, who had to leave their homeland in 1940, and who now live scattered throughout the world. In the subsequent decades the church has become dilapidated. The descendants of the German settlers have financed its reconstruction with their donations."

16.10.1994

Until 18 July 2020, Makhlynets belonged to Zhydachiv Raion. The raion was abolished in July 2020 as part of the administrative reform of Ukraine, which reduced the number of raions of Lviv Oblast to seven. The area of Zhydachiv Raion was merged into Stryi Raion.
