= Khodoriv urban hromada =

Hromada in Lviv Oblast, Ukraine

Khodoriv urban hromada Ходорівська міська громада
- Hromada
- Seal
- Interactive map of Khodoriv urban hromada
- Country: Ukraine
- Oblast: Lviv Oblast
- Raion: Stryi Raion
- Admin. center: Khodoriv

Area
  - Total: 333 km^{2} (129 sq mi)

Population (2021)
  - Total: 24,402
  - Density: 73.3/km^{2} (190/sq mi)
- CATOTTG code: UA46100270000094052
- Settlements: 44
- Cities: 1
- Villages: 43
- Website: hodorivska-gromada.gov.ua

Khodoriv urban hromada (Ukrainian: Ходорівська міська громада) is a hromada in Ukraine, in Stryi Raion of Lviv Oblast. The administrative center is the city of Khodoriv.

== Settlements ==
The hromada consists of 1 city (Khodoriv) and 43 villages:

- Berezyna
- Borynychi
- Borodchytsi
- Bortnyky
- Borusiv
- Bryntsi-Zahirni
- Bryntsi-Tserkovni
- Bukovyna
- Verbytsia
- Vybranivka
- Vovchatychi
- Holeshiv
- Holdovychi
- Horodyshche
- Horodyshchenske
- Hrusiatychi
- Deviatnyky
- Demydiv
- Dobrivliany
- Drokhovychi
- Duliby
- Zhyrova
- Zahirochko
- Zalisky
- Kalynivka
- Kamiane
- Lapshyn
- Lishchyny
- Luchany
- Molodynche
- Molotiv
- Novosiltsi
- Otynevychi
- Piddnistriany
- Pidlisky
- Rudkivtsi
- Sadky
- Suhriv
- Cheremkhiv
- Chyzhychi
- Chornyi Ostriv
- Yushkivtsi
- Yatviahy
