= Hnizdychiv settlement hromada =

Hromada in Lviv Oblast, Ukraine

Hnizdychiv settlement hromada Гніздичівська селищна громада
- Hromada
- Seal
- Interactive map of Hnizdychiv settlement hromada
- Country: Ukraine
- Oblast: Lviv Oblast
- Raion: Stryi Raion
- Admin. center: Hnizdychiv

Area
  - Total: 1,059 km^{2} (409 sq mi)

Population (2021)
  - Total: 7,118
  - Density: 6.721/km^{2} (17.41/sq mi)
- CATOTTG code: UA46100010000066018
- Settlements: 13
- Rural settlements: 1
- Villages: 12
- Website: hnizdychiv.org.ua

Hnizdychiv settlement hromada (Ukrainian: Гніздичівська селищна громада) is a hromada in Ukraine, in Stryi Raion of Lviv Oblast. The administrative center is the rural settlement of Hnizdychiv.

== Settlements ==
The hromada consists of 1 rural settlement (Hnizdychiv) and 12 villages:

- Hannivtsi
- Korolivka
- Livchytsi
- Pokrivtsi
- Ruda
- Volia-Oblaznytska
- Dunaiets
- Zhyrivske
- Kornelivka
- Makhlynets
- Nove Selo
- Oblaznytsia
