= Zhydachiv =

City in Lviv Oblast, Ukraine

Zhydachiv Жидачів Żydaczów
- City
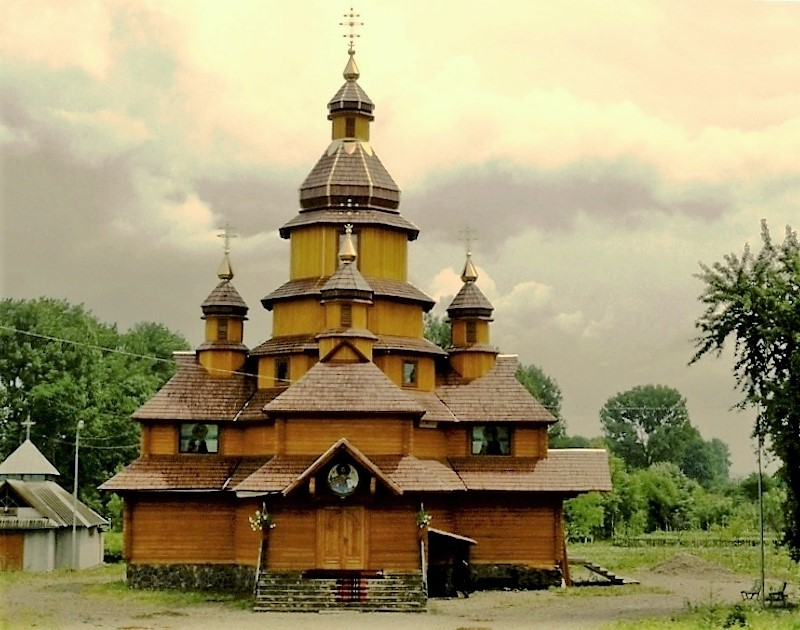
- Church of Boris and Gleb

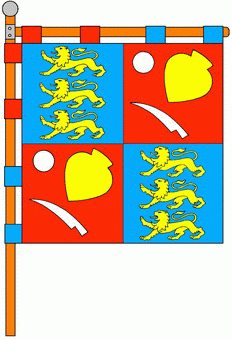
- Flag Coat of arms

- Location Zhydachiv (Ukraine)
- Coordinates: 49°23′06″N 24°08′40″E
- Country: Ukraine
- Oblast: Lviv Oblast
- Raion: Stryi Raion
- Hromada: Zhydachiv urban hromada
- Area: 13 km^{2} (5.0 sq mi)
- Elevation: 261 m (856 ft)
- Population (2022): 10,353
  - Density: 800/km^{2} (2,100/sq mi)
- Website: meriya-zhydachiv.lviv.ua

Zhydachiv (Ukrainian: Жидачів, IPA: [ʒɪˈdɑtʃiu̯]; Polish: Żydaczów) is a city in Stryi Raion, Lviv Oblast (region) in western Ukraine. It hosts the administration of Zhydachiv urban hromada, one of the hromadas of Ukraine. Local government is administered by the Zhydachiv City Council. Its population is approximately 10,353 (2022 estimate).

Zhydachiv lies on the Stryi River. It has two schools and one Ukrainian gymnasium.

== Name ==
The city has historically had numerous name variants, reflecting its complex past, including Polish: Żydaczów and Yiddish: זידיטשוב, romanized: Zidichov, Zhidetshoyv. It was mentioned for the first time in 1164 under the name Udech. In documents from the 14th to 17th centuries, the city was referred to as Zudech, Zudachiv, Sudachiv, Zidachiv, Sidachiv, Zudechev and more.

== History ==
"[In 1164] there was a great flood in Galič [;] the Dnestr River (...) overflowed as far as the Bykov Swamp. And more than three hundred men, who had come with salt from Udeč, drowned; and they took down many men from the trees and carts, which the water had swept away. [And their bread was very expensive] for that winter." – Kievan Chronicle, fol. 187r.

The first written mention of the city dates from the year 1164. At that time the city was part of Galician Rus' and was an important trade center at the confluence of the river Stryi in Dniester with a stone church of St. Nicholas. Then called Udech (Udeč), Zhydachiv formed from two settlements located at a distance of 800 m from each other. Great western fort occupied territory of present-day mount "Bazyivka" and east fort lies in the mount "Zamok" ("Castle"). Since then (13th century) comes famous miraculous icon of the Virgin Mary that still remains in the city.

Between this two fortifications were also mentioned are six unfortified settlements, which were also included in the structure of the city. Between the two Fortifications on the old river bed (district Korablyshche) most likely was located a river harbor, and the district Bologna may be a main shopping area of the ancient Rus' city.

In the mid-14th century, Zhydachiv, together with all of Galicia, was seized by the Kingdom of Poland, then some time became a part of the Kingdom of Hungary and in 1387 again conquered by Jadwiga of Poland. From 1434 Zhydachiv, was part of Poland's Ruthenian Voivodeship. By the end of 14th century, there were two castles, four Orthodox churches, one Roman Catholic church, a Market Square and a wooden Town Hall. King Wladyslaw Jagiello granted in 1393 Magdeburg rights and several privileges, also founding a Roman Catholic church. Zhydachiv for centuries remained in private hands, among others it belonged to the noble Rzewuski family, had a defensive castle and was the seat of a starosta.

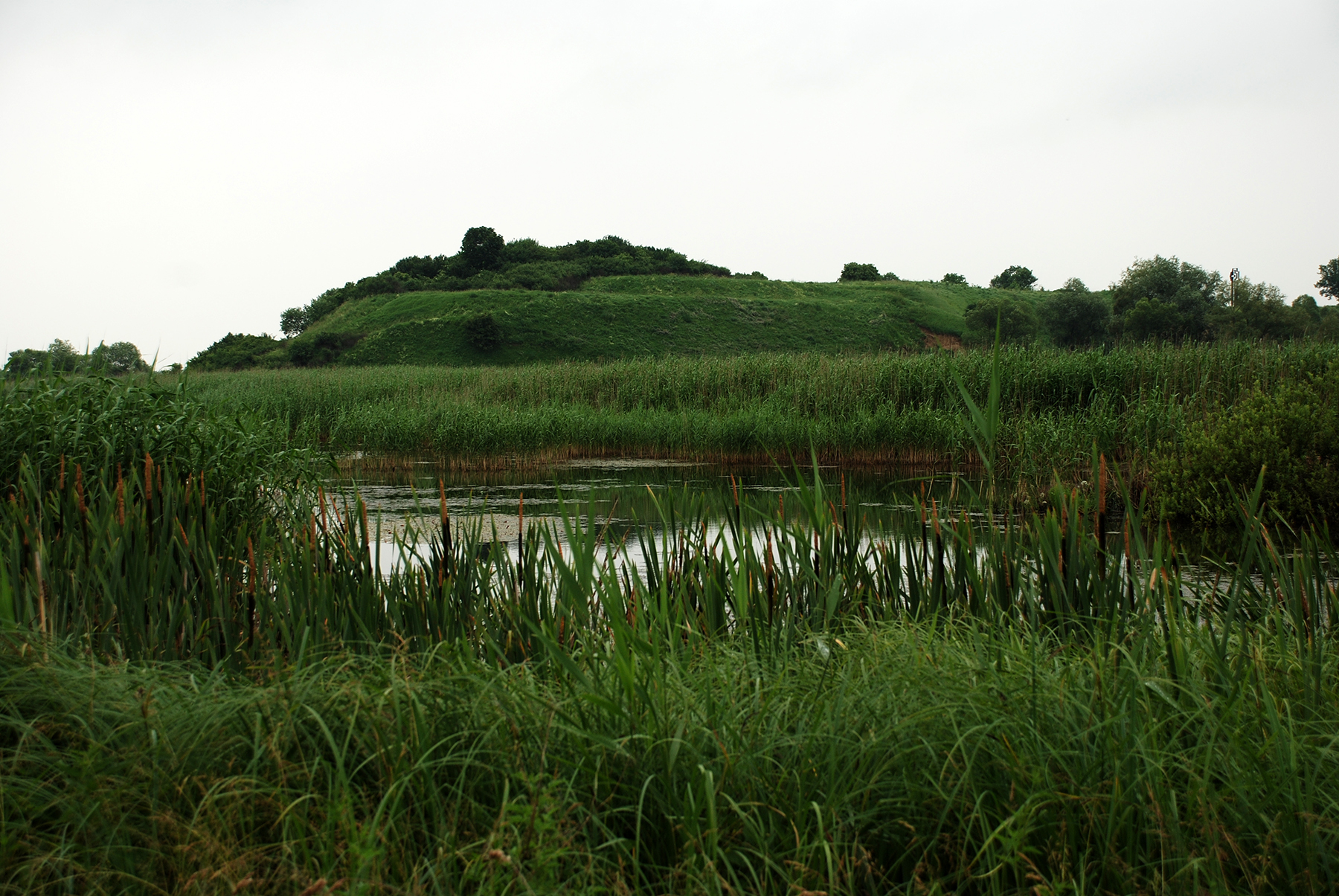
Mount Zamok with remains of earthen walls of 18th–19th centuries' fortification

In the middle of the 17th century, population of Zhydachiv participated in the Khmelnytsky Uprising also known as the liberation war led by Bohdan Khmelnytsky. In 1772, it was seized by the Habsburg Empire, as part of Austrian Galicia and in 1800 a Jewish rabbinical School was established.

From 1 November 1918 until May 1919, it was administered by the West Ukrainian People's Republic. After the Polish–Ukrainian War, Zhydachiv became a part of Second Polish Republic and was the seat of a county in Stanislawow Voivodeship. In 1929, the population of Zhydachiv was almost 4,200 including 1,960 Ukrainians, 1,290 Poles and a quarter of the total population (950 members) were the Jews. In September 1939, Zhydachiv was occupied by the Red Army. Soviet authorities deported the Polish residents to Siberia. When the Germans occupied the town in 1941–1944, they kept Jews imprisoned in a ghetto. In September 1942, they were deported to the Bełżec extermination camp and murdered.

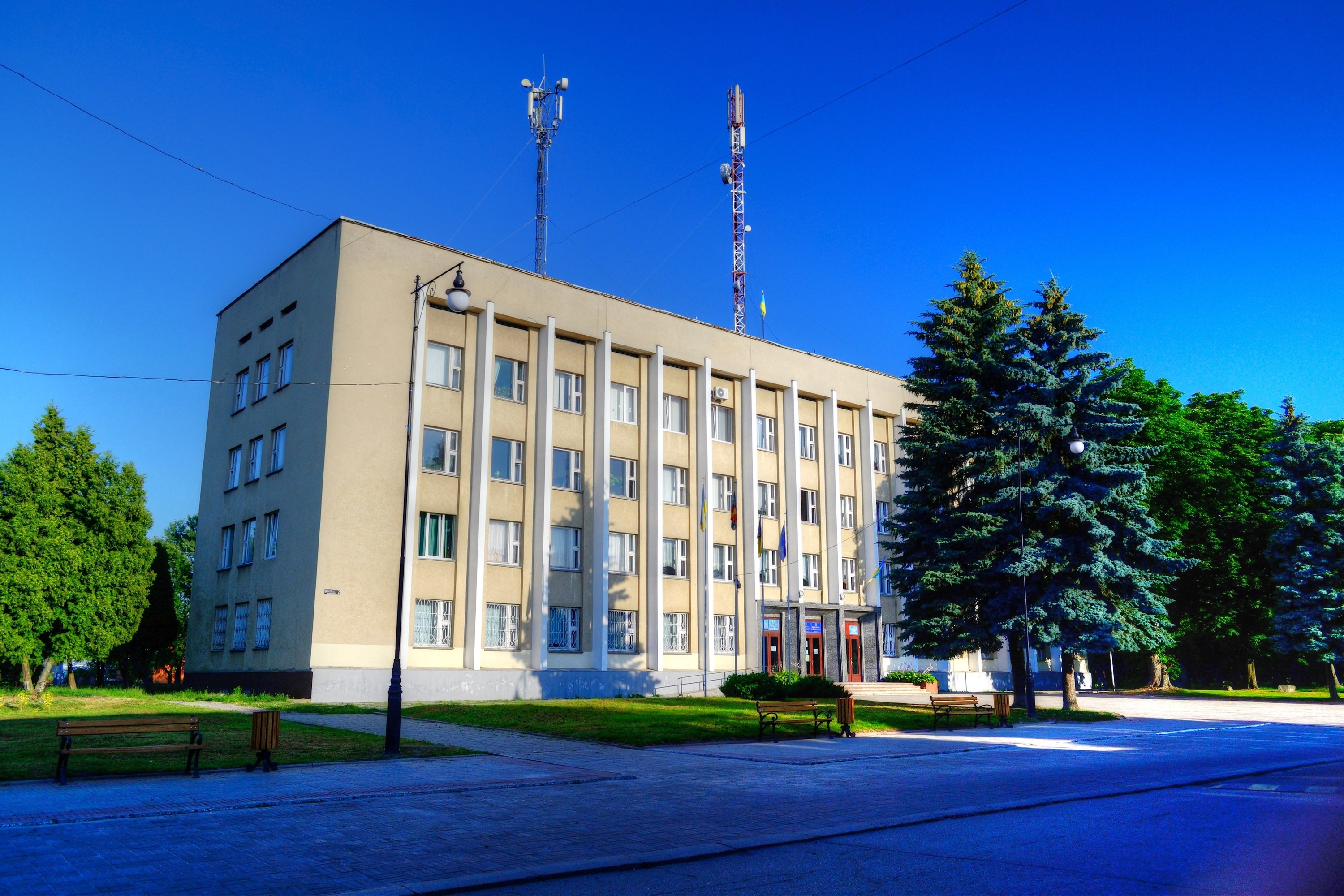
City hall

After World War II, the city was incorporated into the Ukrainian Soviet Socialist Republic, and from that time started a process of industrialization. In 1951, Zhydachiv become a home of Ukraine's largest pulp and paper mill, which produces 90% of Ukrainian paper. The population has increased fivefold. After 1991, Zhydachiv has been a city in independent Ukraine as the center of the Zhydachiv Raion in Lviv Oblast.

Until 18 July 2020, Zhydachiv was the administrative center of Zhydachiv Raion. The raion was abolished in July 2020 as part of the administrative reform of Ukraine, which reduced the number of raions of Lviv Oblast to seven. The area of Zhydachiv Raion was merged into Stryi Raion.

== Population ==
=== Language ===
Distribution of the population by native language according to the 2001 census:

Language	Number	Percentage
Ukrainian	11 397	97.55%
Russian	227	1.94%
Other or undecided	59	0.51%
Total	11 683	100.00%

== Economy ==
Zhydachiv is a centre of paper industry. Surrounding areas produce natural gas.

== Twin towns ==
- Towcester, Northamptonshire, United Kingdom
- Prnjavor, Bosnia and Herzegovina

== Notable residents ==
- Yulian-Yurii Dorosh (1909–1982), Ukrainian photographer-artist, pioneer of Ukrainian cinematography in Galicia, ethnographer, local historian
- Rebbe Tzvi Hirsh of Zidichov (1763 -1831)

== Gallery ==
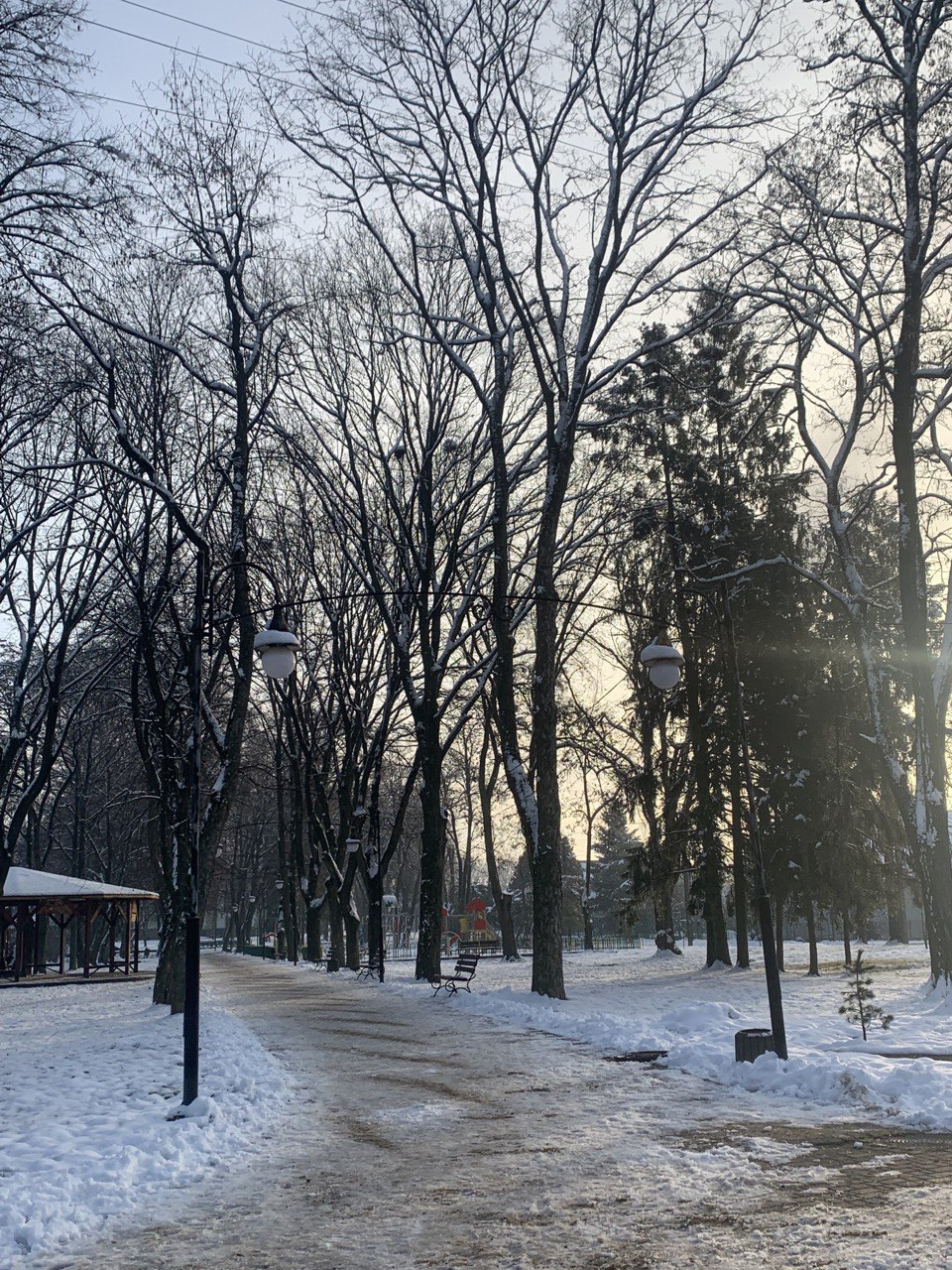
City park

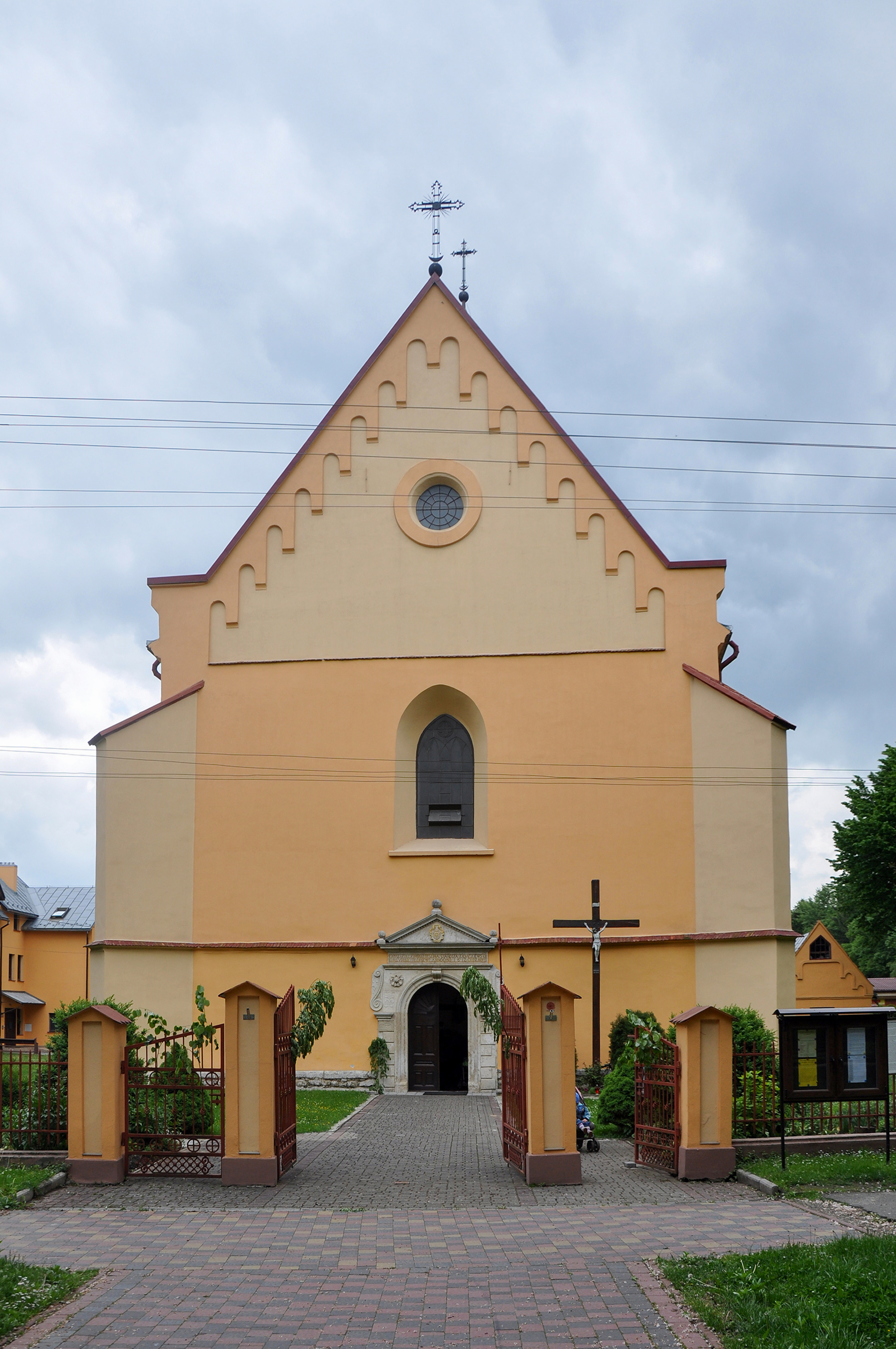
Roman Catholic Church of the Dormition

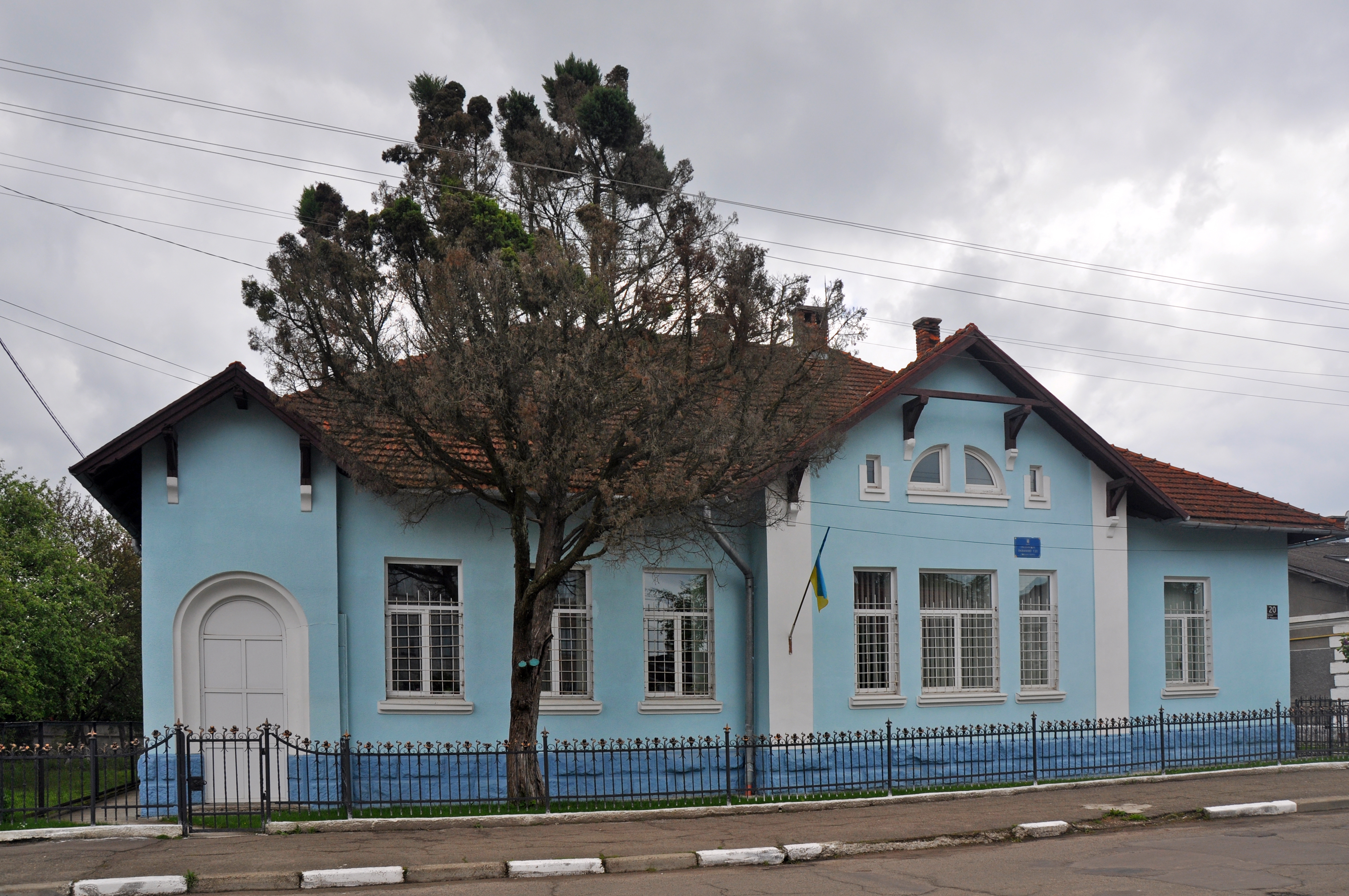
Local court

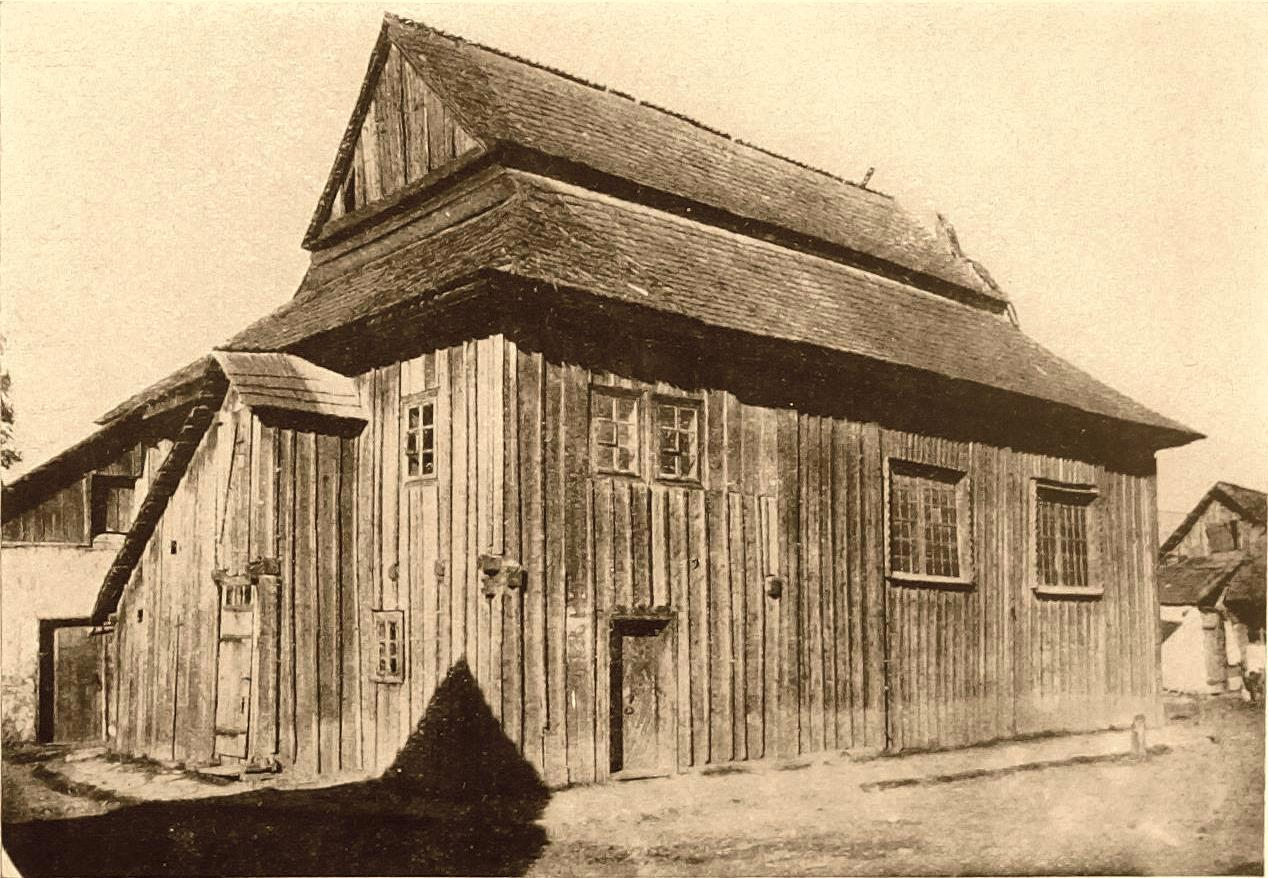
Wooden synagogue before destruction

== See also ==
- Zidichov (Hasidic dynasty)

== Sources ==
- Heinrich, Lisa Lynn (1977). The Kievan Chronicle: A Translation and Commentary (PhD diss.). Nashville, Tennessee: Vanderbilt University. ProQuest 7812419
- Makhnovets, Leonid (1989). Літопис Руський за Іпатським списком [Rus' Chronicle according to the Hypatian Codex] (in Ukrainian). Kyiv: Dnipro. p. 591. ISBN 5-308-00052-2.
- Shakhmatov, Aleksey Aleksandrovich, ed. (1908). Ipat'evskaya letopis' Ипатьевская лѣтопись [The Hypatian Codex]. Complete Collection of Russian Chronicles (PSRL) (in Church Slavic and Russian). Vol. 2 (3rd ed.). Saint Petersburg: Typography of M. A. Aleksandrov / Izbornyk.
