= Zhydachiv urban hromada =

Hromada in Lviv Oblast, Ukraine

Zhydachiv urban hromada Жидачівська міська громада
- Hromada
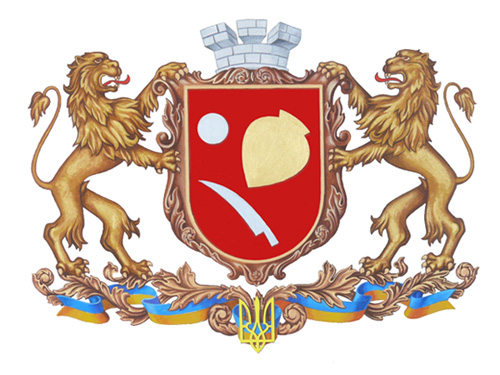
- Seal
- Interactive map of Zhydachiv urban hromada
- Country: Ukraine
- Oblast: Lviv Oblast
- Raion: Stryi Raion
- Admin. center: Zhydachiv

Area
  - Total: 1,784 km^{2} (689 sq mi)

Population (2021)
  - Total: 17,682
  - Density: 9.911/km^{2} (25.67/sq mi)
- CATOTTG code: UA46100050000053848
- Settlements: 18
- Cities: 1
- Villages: 17
- Website: zhidachiv-miskrada.gov.ua

Zhydachiv urban hromada (Ukrainian: Жидачівська міська громада) is a hromada in Ukraine, in Stryi Raion of Lviv Oblast. The administrative center is the city of Zhydachiv.

== Settlements ==
The hromada consists of 1 city (Zhydachiv) and 17 villages:

- Berezhnytsia
- Vilkhivtsi
- Volytsia-Hnizdychivska
- Demianka-Lisna
- Demianka-Naddnistrianska
- Zhuravkiv
- Zabolotivtsi
- Zahurshchyna
- Zarichchia
- Ivanivtsi
- Mezhyrichchia
- Mlynyska
- Pchany
- Rohizno
- Smohiv
- Teisariv
- Turady
