= List of mountains in Ukraine =

There are two predominant mountain regions in Ukraine: the Carpathians and the Crimean Mountains. Ukraine is located in the East European Plain with most of this region consisting of rolling hills rather than real mountains. Some high peaks can be found in areas such as Podilian Tovtry and Donets Ridge.

Chornohora (lit. 'Black Mountain') is a mountain range in the Carpathians which consists of the highest mountain peaks in the country. Other notable ranges are Maramureş and Gorgany, also located in the Carpathians. In the Crimean Mountains, the highest mountain range of Babuğan yayla is located closer to the Crimean Southern Coast and is part of the main mountain chain.

This page shows the highest mountains in Ukraine.

== Highest mountains in Ukraine ==
This list contains peaks with height above 1,500 m. The numbering (except of first 10) is disputable.

Rank	Image	Mountain	Height (m)	System	Range	Coordinates
1		Hoverla	2,061	Carpathian	Chornohora	48°09′36″N 24°30′01″E
2		Brebeneskul	2,035	Carpathian	Chornohora	48°05′54″N 24°34′50″E
3		Pip Ivan	2,021	Carpathian	Chornohora	48°02′52″N 24°37′40″E
4		Petros	2,020	Carpathian	Chornohora	48°10′22″N 24°25′16″E
5		Hutyn Tomnatyk	2,016	Carpathian	Chornohora	48°06′00″N 24°33′24″E
6		Rebra	2,001	Carpathian	Chornohora	48°06′41″N 24°33′36″E
7		Menchul	1,998	Carpathian	Chornohora	48°05′30″N 24°35′45″E
8		Pip Ivan	1,936	Carpathian	Maramureș	48°55′35″N 24°19′30″E
9		Turkul	1,933	Carpathian	Chornohora	48°07′26″N 24°31′52″E
10		Breskul	1,911	Carpathian	Chornohora	48°09′04″N 24°30′43″E
11		Smotrych	1,898	Carpathian	Chornohora	48°04′10″N 24°38′43″E
12		Blyznytsya	1,882	Carpathian	Svydovets	48°13′21″N 24°13′58″E
13		Dzembronia	1,877	Carpathian	Chornohora	48°04′38″N 24°36′18″E
14		Shpytsi	1,863	Carpathian	Chornohora	48°07′32″N 24°34′05″E
15		Petrosul	1,855	Carpathian	Chornohora	48°04′38″N 24°36′18″E
16		Dantsir	1,856	Carpathian	Chornohora	48°08′06″N 24°31′52″E
17		Pozhyzhevska	1,822	Carpathian	Chornohora	48°8′38″N 24°31′27″E
18		Neniska Velyka	1,820	Carpathian	Maramureș	
19		Syvulya	1,818	Carpathian	Gorgany	
20		Ihrovets	1,803	Carpathian	Gorgany	
21		Zherban	1,795	Carpathian	Maramureș	
22		Bratkivska	1,788	Carpathian	Gorgany	
23		Homul	1,788	Carpathian	Chornohora	
24		Petros	1,784	Carpathian	Maramureș	
25		Shuryn	1,772	Carpathian	Chornohora	
26		Velyky Kotel	1,771	Carpathian	Svydovets	
27		Chyvchyn	1,769	Carpathian	Chyvchyn	
28		Dohyaska	1,764	Carpathian	Svydovets	
29		Hropa	1,763	Carpathian	Gorgany	
30		Dragobrat	1,763	Carpathian	Svydovets	
30		Dovbushanka	1,754	Carpathian	Gorgany	
31		Grofa	1,748	Carpathian	Gorgany	
32		Popadya	1,740	Carpathian	Gorgany	
33		Parenky	1,735	Carpathian	Gorgany	
34		Koman	1,723	Carpathian	Chyvchyn	
35		Moloda	1,723	Carpathian	Gorgany	
36		Strymba	1,719	Carpathian	Gorgany	
37		Chorna Kleva	1,719	Carpathian	Gorgany	
38		Tataruka	1,711	Carpathian	Svydovets	
39		Durna	1,709	Carpathian	Gorgany	
40		Unharyaska	1,708	Carpathian	Svydovets	
41		Nehrovets	1,707	Carpathian	Gorgany	
42		Stih	1,707	Carpathian	Svydovets	
43		Bushtul	1,691	Carpathian	Gorgany	
44		Yayko-Ilemske	1,679	Carpathian	Gorgany	
45		Budychevska Velyka	1,677	Carpathian	Chyvchyn	
46		Stiy	1,677	Carpathian	Borzhava	
47		Bert	1,666	Carpathian	Gorgany	
48		Synyak	1,665	Carpathian	Gorgany	
49		Stih	1,635	Carpathian	Maramureș	
50		Tempa	1,635	Carpathian	Svydovets	
51		Pidpula	1,634	Carpathian	Svydovets	
52		Yayko-Perehinske	1,595	Carpathian	Gorgany	
53		Baba-Lyudova	1,590	Carpathian	Hrynyavy	
54		Kernychny	1,588	Carpathian	Chyvchyn	
55		Gorgan-Ilemsky	1,587	Carpathian	Gorgany	
56		Skupova	1,583	Carpathian	Hrynyavy	
57		Yarovytsya	1,574	Carpathian	Yalovychory	
58		Berlyaska	1,555	Carpathian	Svydovets	
59		Tarnavytsya	1,553	Carpathian	Hrynyavy	
60		Roman-Kosh	1,545	Crimean	Babuğan Yayla	44°36′39″N 34°14′36″E
61		Demir-Kapu	1,540	Crimean	Nikit Yayla	44°35′06″N 34°12′26″E
62		Zeytin-Kosh	1,537	Crimean	Babuğan Yayla	44°37′02″N 34°16′49″E
63		Kemal-Egerek	1,529	Crimean	Nikit Yayla	44°34′44″N 34°11′04″E
64		Eklizi-Burun	1,527	Crimean	Çatır Dağ	44°44′24″N 34°17′19″E
65		Roztitska	1,527	Carpathian	Hrynyavy	
66		Zhyd-Mahura	1,518	Carpathian	Borzhava	
67		Velyky Verkh	1,508	Carpathian	Borzhava	
68		Pikui	1,405	Carpathian	Striysko-Syanskaya Verkhovina	48°49′48″N 23°00′02″E
69		Parashka	1,268.5	Carpathian	Parashka range	49°04′10″N 23°24′51″E
70		Trostian	1,235	Carpathian	Striysko-Syanskaya Verkhovina	48°51′24″N 23°23′31″E
