= Lake Brebeneskul =

Lake in Ukraine

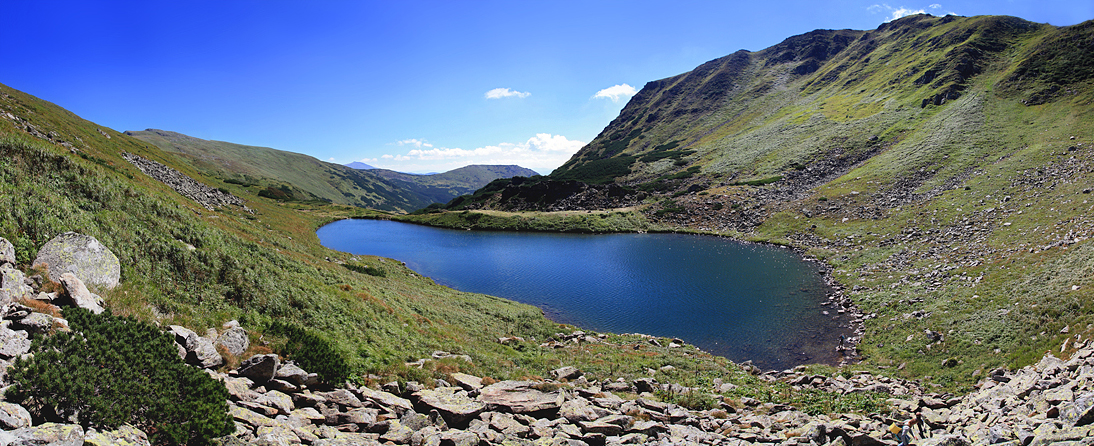
- View of Lake Brebeneskul

- Location within Zakarpattia Oblast Location within Ukraine Location within Europe
- Location: Zakarpattia Oblast
- Coordinates: 48°6′8″N 24°33′41″E
- Type: mountain lake
- Basin countries: Ukraine
- Max. length: 0.134 km (0 mi)
- Max. width: 28–44 km (17–27 mi)
- Surface area: 0.0061 km^{2} (0 sq mi)
- Max. depth: 2.8 m (9 ft)
- Surface elevation: 1,801 m (5,909 ft)

Lake Brebeneskul (Ukrainian: Озеро Бребенескул) is a mountain lake located in the Wooded Carpathians. It is the highest lake in Ukraine, at an altitude of 1,801 m (5,909 ft) above sea level. It has a glacial origin and is located in the Rakhiv Raion of Zakarpattia Oblast.

== Description ==
Lake Brebeneskul has length of is 134 m, width of 28-44 m and the depth is up to 2.8 m. The area of the lake is 0.61 ha. Lake Brebeneskul has an oval shape, its shores are high, with stone talus. The resources of the lake are fed mainly by precipitation and groundwater. The river Brebeneskul flows out of the lake (a tributary of the Hoverla and the basin of the Bila Tysa). The bottom rises in an easterly direction, at a depth covered with gray silt. The water in the lake is slightly mineralized and clean, as well as transparent and relatively warm for a mountain lake.

== Location ==
Lake Brebeneskul is located in the Rakhiv Raion of Zakarpattia Oblast on the southwestern slope of the Chornohora between the mountains Brebeneskul (2035 m) and Hutyn Tomnatyk (2016 m). It lies at the bottom of a cirque and is also part of the Carpathian Biosphere Reserve.
