= Svydovets =

Mountain range in Ukraine

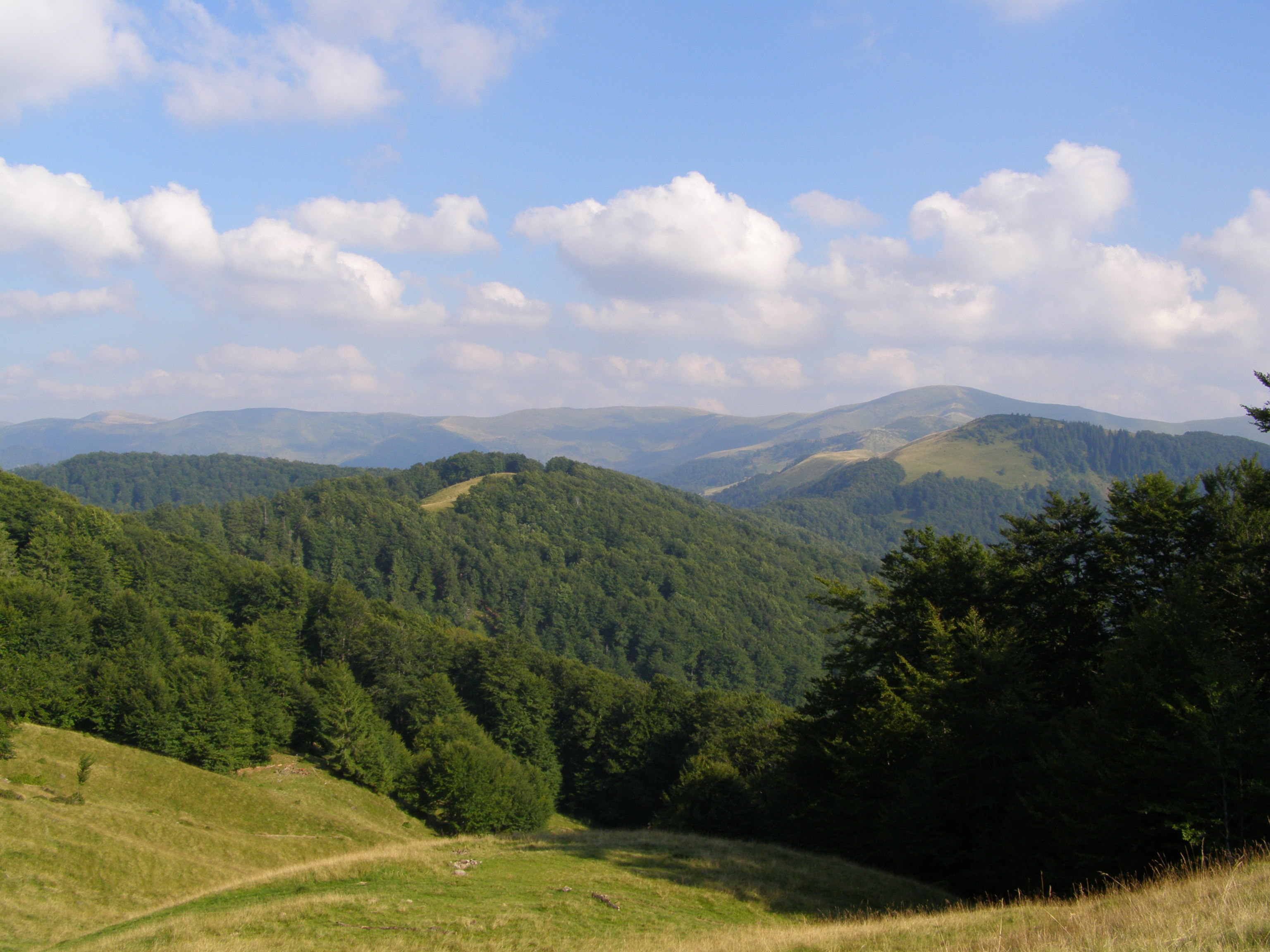

Highest point
- Peak: Blyznytsi
- Elevation: 1,883 m (6,178 ft)
- Coordinates: 48°15′24″N 24°12′13″E

Naming
- Native name: Свидовець (Ukrainian); Świdowiec (Polish); Svidovec (Czech); Svidovec (Slovak); Swydiwez (German)

Geography
- Location within Ukraine

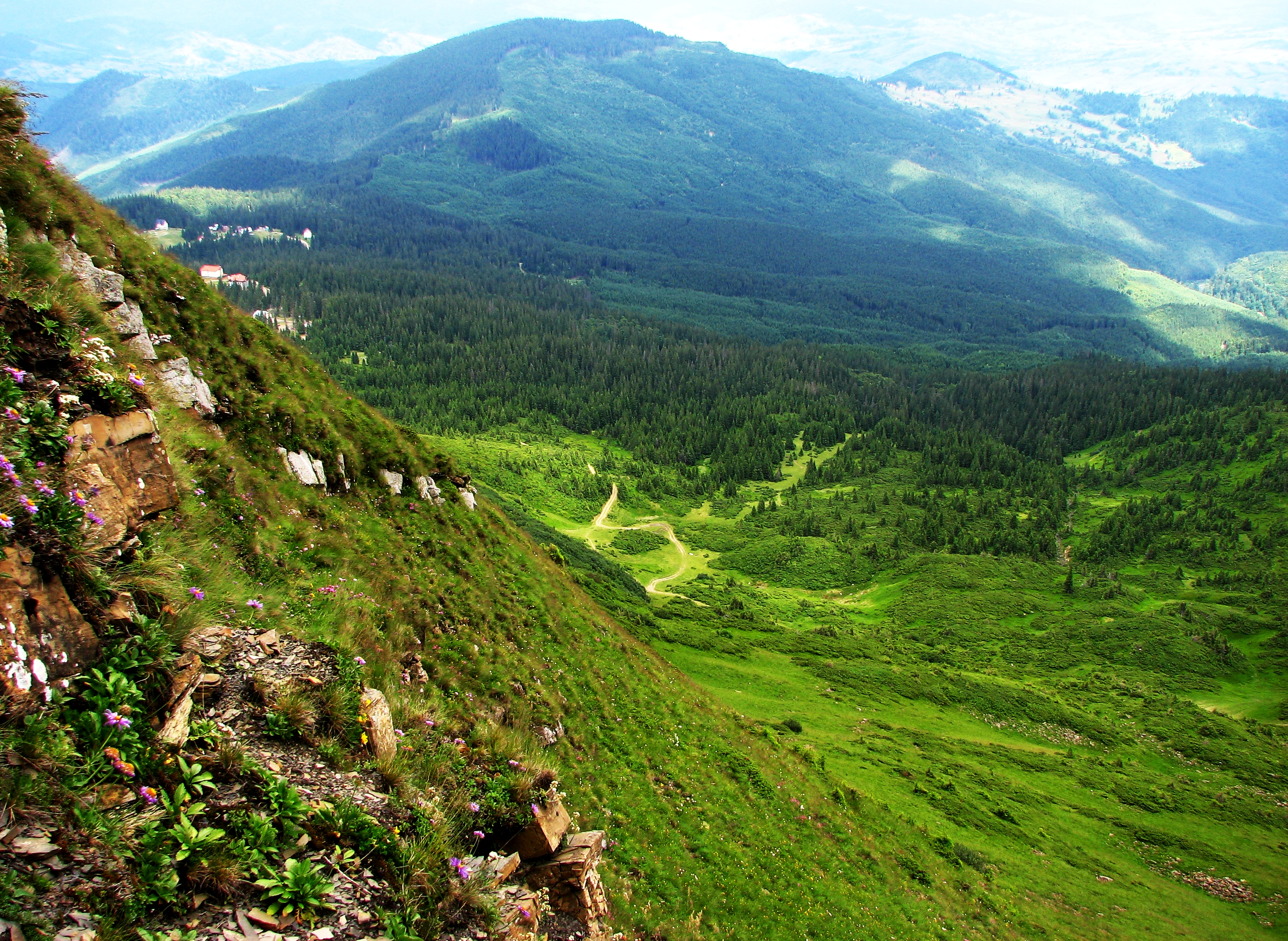
Svydovets landscape

The Svydovets (Ukrainian Свидовець; Polish Świdowiec; Czech and Slovak Svidovec; German Swydiwez) is a mountain range in western Ukraine, one of the ranges of Eastern Beskids, itself belonging to the Outer Eastern Carpathians. It is a biodiversity hotspot in the Ukrainian Carpathians. The territories of the Svydovets mountain range belong to the state. The highest peak of the range is Blyznytsi mountain (1883 m). The Black Tisza, the source of Tisza, is one of the more fullflowing rivers of the region, it flows out from the Svydovets.

== Flora and fauna ==
The Svydovets is home to 42 plant species and 51 animal species that are listed in the Red Data Book of Ukraine as endangered. The red-listed plant species include the Rhodiola rosea, the Carpathian saxifrage, the fir clubmoss (Huperzia selago), and the stiff clubmoss (Lycopodium annotinum). The endangered animal species include the European brown bear, the Eurasian lynx, the black grouse, and the Eurasian eagle-owl. There are also species endemic to the region like the Carpathian newt (Lissotriton montandoni). All of the ten woodpecker species of European deciduous forests can be found in the Svydovets. There are three lakes, located on the Svydovets range: the high-mountain lake Apshynets (also referred to as Troiaska), Vorozheska and the glacial high-mountain pond Heryshaska (or Dohiaska), with little algae, the most common of the fauna are microscopic crustaceans.

Two mountain ranges in the Ukrainian Carpathians, Borzhava and Svydovets (Svydovets Protected Massif), are protected under the Emerald Network of environmentally important conservation areas established by the Council of Europe. The Natura 2000 network apply there.

== Environmental degradation ==
Plans to build ski resorts in the Carpathians have long faced opposition from environmentalists, who warn they will drive illegal logging and deforestation in the protected areas, exacerbate floods in the Carpathians, and harm endangered species. In July 2016, the then-governor of Zakarpattia Oblast, Hennadiy Moskal, was the first to announce the idea of a mega ski resort on the Svydovets mountain range. The project area spans Tiachiv Raion and Rakhiv Raion. Three villages are directly affected: Yasinia, Black Tisza and Lopukhiv. Moskal supported the establishment of the ski resort, financed by unknown investors. He announced that the existing Bukovel ski resort, which as later exposed was controlled by companies linked to Ihor Kolomoisky (third richest man in Ukraine and owner of the television station that launched the career of President Volodymyr Zelenskyy), would expand to include the Svydovets mountain range. Government officials have lobbied for approval of the project. While the competent authorities continued to present the Svydovets resort as a government initiative, the billion-dollar plan was in fact designed as a gigantic expansion of the privat Bukovel ski resort. The construction of a large-scale infrastructure in the undisturbed mountain area of Svydovets threatened the whole ecosystem and the hydrological systems throughout the wider region.

The legal problems of the promoters of the controversial Svydovets ski resort raised the question if they are trustworthy and reliable partners for a large-scale project that implies the privatization of 1430 hectares of state lands. In June 2019 the report ‘Svydovets Case: How oligarchs are planning to destroy one of Ukraine’s most pristine natural landscapes‘ was presented in Kyiv. This report described the issue of the mega ski resort construction. In November 2019, The New York Times reported that the disgraced oligarch Kolomoisky was behind the "bizarre ski resort plan".

== Geography ==
Map with the Svydovets range marked in red

Svydovets hosts one of the ten units of the Primeval Beech Forests of the Carpathians, recognised as a UNESCO World Heritage Site in 2007.

The higher peaks include:

- Blyznytsi (Близниці - 1883 meters)
- Tataruka (Татарука - 1774 meters)
- Dohiaska (Догяска - 1764 meters)
- Unhariaska (Унгаряска - 1707 meters)

== See also ==
- Divisions of the Carpathians
- Ukrainian Carpathians
- Wooded Carpathians
- Polonynian Beskids
- Polonyna (montane meadow)

== Sources ==
- Földvary, Gábor Z. (1988). Geology of the Carpathian Region. Singapore: World Scientific Publishing Company. ISBN 9789813103825.
- Tasenkevich, Lydia (2009). "Polonynas: Highlands Pastures in the Ukrainian Carpathians". Grasslands in Europe: Of High Nature Value. Zeist: KNNV Publishing. pp. 203–208. ISBN 9789004278103.

== Environmental justice organizations ==
- Free Svydovets - https://freesvydovets.org/en/
- European Wilderness Society - https://wilderness-society.org/
- Bruno Manser Fonds - http://www.bmf.ch/waldkarpaten/en/
- European Civic Forum - http://civic-forum.eu/
- WWF Global - http://wwf.panda.org/?325650/Petition-to-save-Svydovets-massif-in-Ukraine-initiated
