= Pip Ivan (Chornohora) =

Coordinates: 48°02′49″N 24°37′38″E

- Chorna Hora
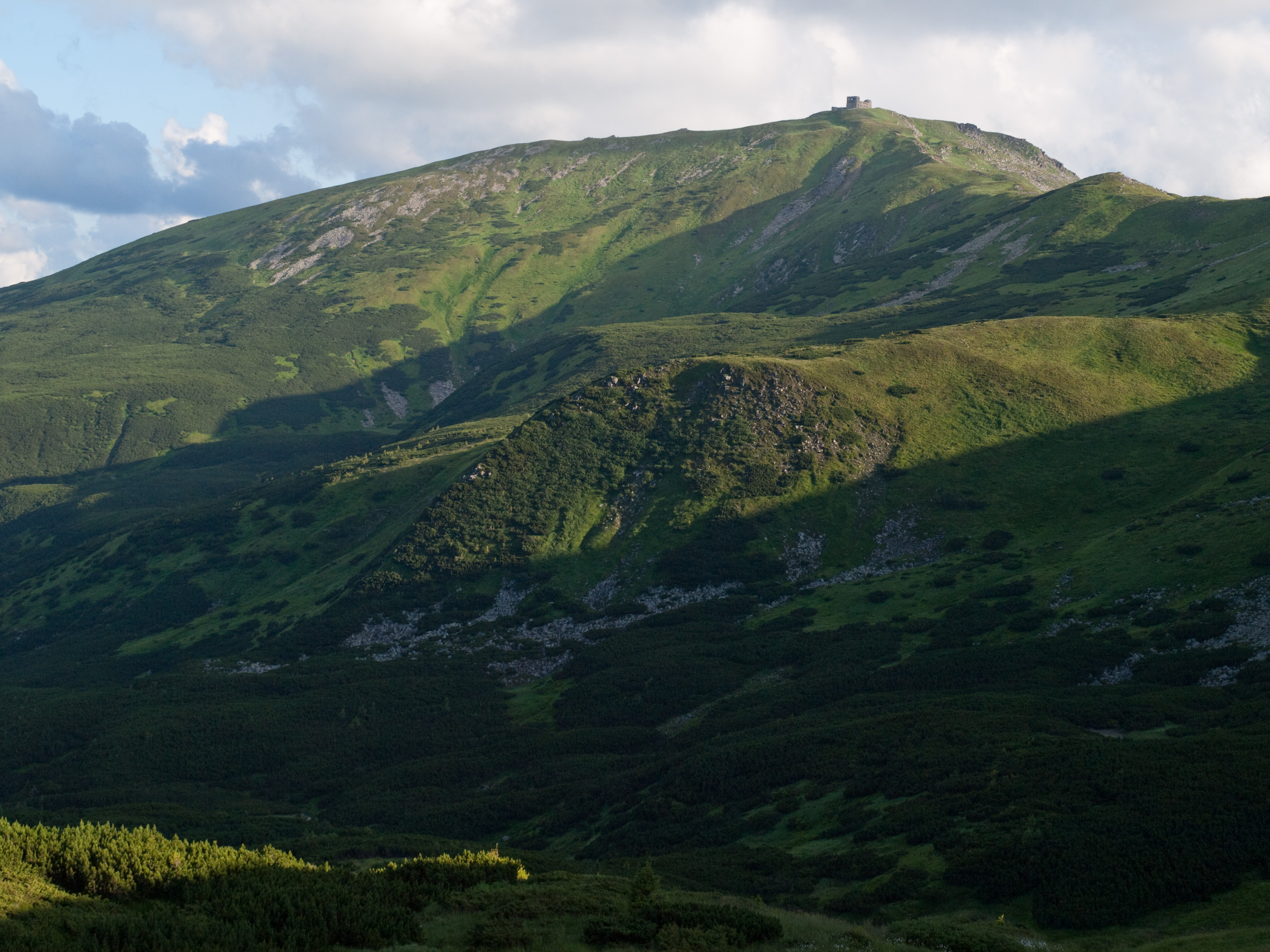

Highest point
- Elevation: 2,022 m (6,634 ft)

Naming
- Native name: Піп Іван (Ukrainian); Pop Iwan (Polish)

Geography
- Country: Ukraine

Pip Ivan (Ukrainian: Піп Іван; Polish: Pop Iwan, also called Chorna Hora ('Black Mountain') is the third highest peak in Ukraine. (Note: The two higher mountains are Hoverla and Brebeneskul.) Located in the Chornohora range of the Carpathian mountains, it is 2,022 metres (6,634 ft) above sea level.

From 1918 until 1939, the peak marked the border between the First Czechoslovak Republic and the Second Polish Republic; from March 1939, the Polish-Hungarian border.

Between 1936 and1938 the Polish government built an astronomical and meteorological observatory, which became known as Biały Słoń ('White Elephant').

== Description ==
Pip Ivan is the third highest peak in Ukraine. It is located in the Chornohora range of the Carpathian mountains, and is 2,022 metres (6,634 ft) above sea level.

== Observatory and meteorological station ==
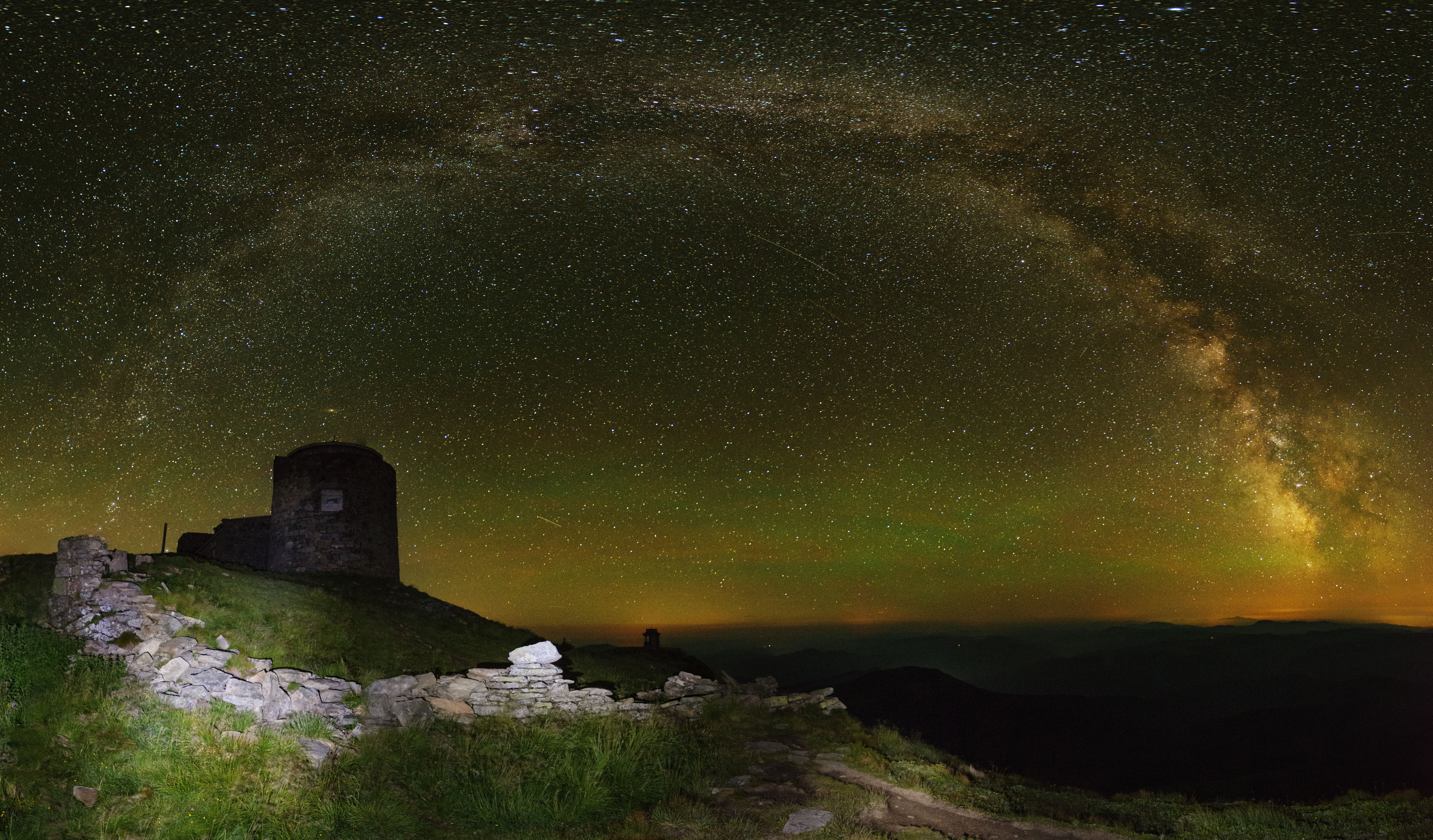
The Pip Ivan Observatory

Building materials were brought up the mountain from neighbouring villages. The equipment was located from all over the world. The strenuous manual labour required for the enormous project was undertaken by Hutsuls from western Ukraine and northern Romania, who built a road specifically to carry loads by horseback or upon their own backs. Along with the 43-room main building, greenhouses were built. The observatory and hostel was opened in July 1938.

The facilities were designed for researchers and servicemen to remain on the mountain throughout the year, although scientists were sometimes caught in avalanches whilst travelling there. The main equipment in the observatory was the astrograph imported from Edinburgh, whose lens had a diameter of 33 centimetres (13 in), Scientists used the telescope to study planets, comets, and stars. It was driven by automatically-regulated engines, and the dome of the tower had its own electric motors. A copper-cast dome with a diameter of 10 metres (33 ft) was installed on top of the tower.

At the start of World War II, the research station personnel were evacuated, and the equipment was dismantled and taken away. In 1939, when the Chornohora mountain range was incorporated into the USSR, attempts were made to continue to study the weather at the station, but scientific activity ceased after two years. Thereafter, the mountain was used as an observation point by Hungarian troops; it was abandoned in 1944..

The building's external walls survived largely intact since the end of the war in 1945, but the internal wall slowly disappeared. There were none remaining in 2012, when restoration work began at the site. The roof has since been replaced, and floors, strong doors, and windows have been installed. Future plans include the restoration of the stone fence that surrounded the observatory, and the installation of solar cells.

== Tourism ==
The peak has traditionally been popular with tourists as it is at one end of a chain beginning at Mount Hoverla. The former observatory has become a popular destination for tourists.

== Sources ==
- Evans, Andrew (2007). Ukraine: The Bradt Travel Guide. Chalfont St. Peter, UK: Bradt Travel Guides. ISBN 9781841621814.
