= Eastern Beskids =

Group of mountain ranges in Ukraine

Coordinates: 49°15′N 22°00′E

Eastern Beskids, marked in red color and labeled with letter C

The Eastern Beskids or Eastern Beskyds (Ukrainian: Східні Бескиди, romanized: Skhidni Beskydy; Polish: Beskidy Wschodnie; Rusyn: Выходны Бескиды; Romanian: Beschizii Orientali) are a geological group of mountain ranges of the Beskids, within the Outer Eastern Carpathians. As a continuation of the Central Beskids, this mountain range includes the far southeastern corner of Poland, the far eastern corner of Slovakia, and stretches southward through western parts of Ukraine, up to the border of Romania.

In Polish and Ukrainian terminology, the range is commonly called the "Eastern Beskids" (Ukrainian: Східні Бескиди; Polish: Beskidy Wschodnie), while in Slovakia, the term Meadowed Mountains (Slovak: Poloniny) is also used. The scope of those terms varies in accordance to different traditions and classifications.

At the three-way border, portions of the Slovak Bukovec Mountains (Slovak: Bukovské vrchy), the Polish Bieszczady Mountains (Polish: Bieszczady Zachodnie), and the adjacent "Uzhanskyi National Nature Park" and Nadsianskyi Regional Landscape Park in Ukraine form the transnational East Carpathian Biosphere Reserve.

== Subdivisions ==
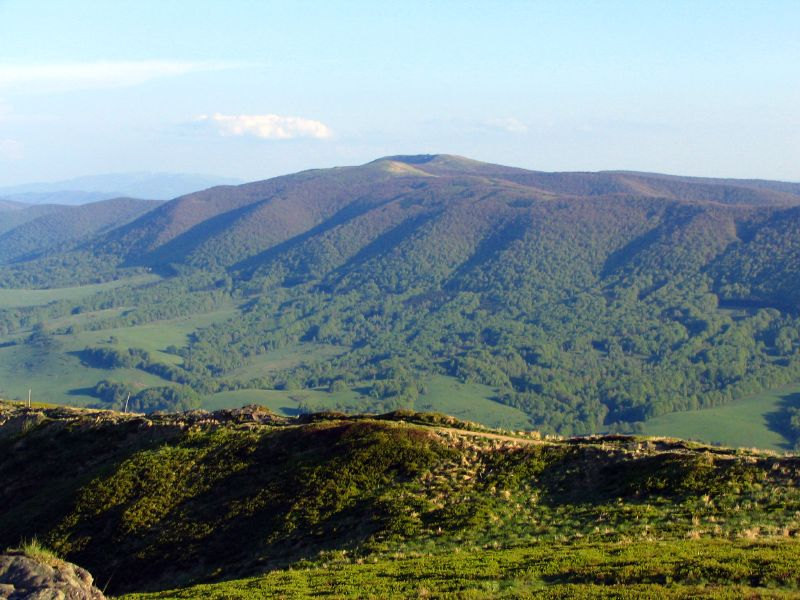
Western Bieszczady, Poland

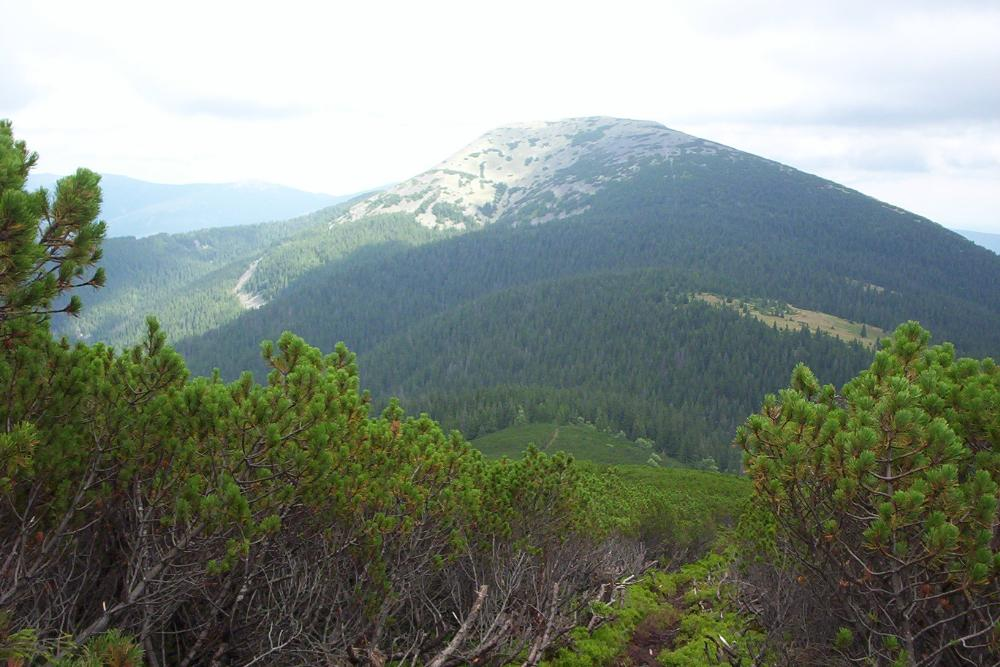
Grofa, Gorgany range

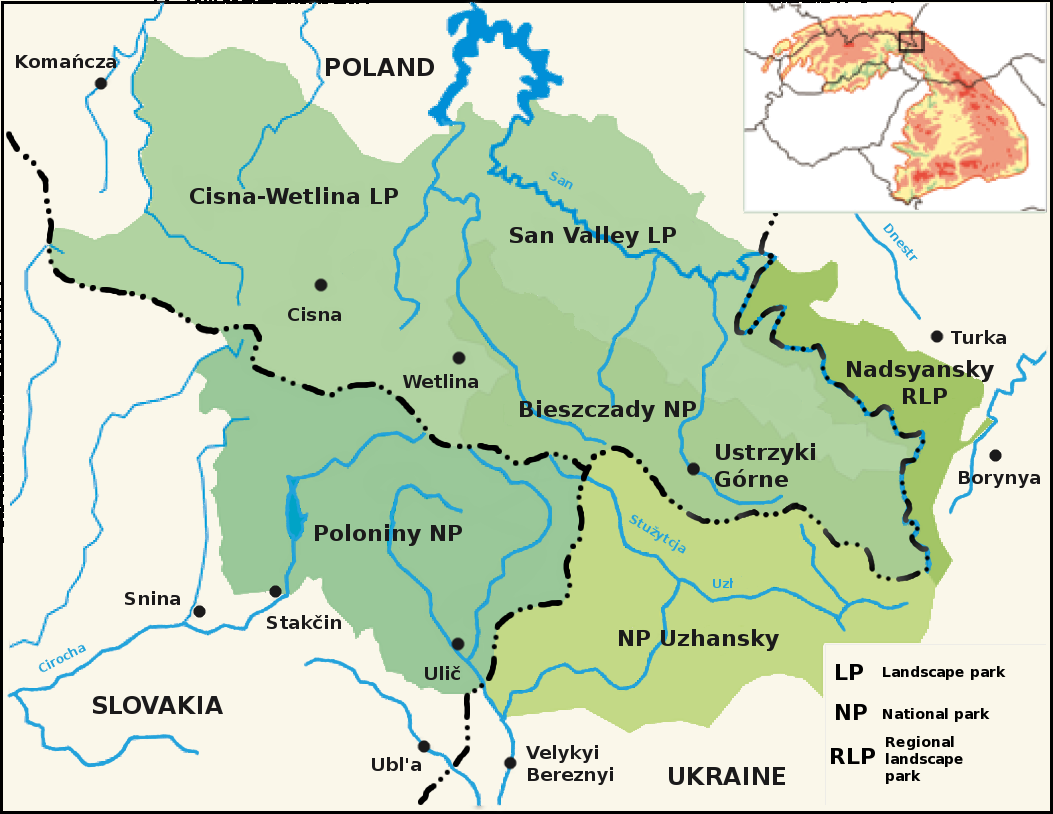
East Carpathian Biosphere Reserve

The Eastern Beskids are commonly divided into two parallel ridges: Wooded Beskids and Polonynian Beskids.

Wooded Beskids (Polish: Beskidy Lesiste; Ukrainian: Лісисті Бескиди):

- Bieszczady Mountains (Polish: Bieszczady; Slovak: Beščady; Ukrainian: Бещади) → c1
  - Western Bieszczady (Polish: Bieszczady Zachodnie; Ukrainian: Західні Бещади) mainly in Poland and Slovakia, including the Bukovec Mountains (Slovak: Bukovské vrchy)
  - Eastern Bieszczady (Polish: Bieszczady Wschodnie; Ukrainian: Східні Бещади), mainly in Ukraine
- Sanok-Turka Mountains (Polish: Góry Sanocko-Turczańskie; Ukrainian: Верхньодністровські Бескиди) → c3
- Skole Beskids (Polish: Beskidy Skolskie; Ukrainian: Сколівські Бескиди) → c2
- Gorgany (Polish: Gorgany; Ukrainian: Ґорґани) → c4
- Pokuttia-Bukovina Beskids (Polish: Beskidy Pokucko-Bukowińskie; Ukrainian: Покутсько-Буковинські Карпати) → c5

Polonynian Beskids (Polish: Beskidy Połonińskie; Ukrainian: Полонинські Бескиди):

- Smooth Polonyna (Polish: Połonina Równa; Ukrainian: Полонина Рівна) → c6
- Polonyna Borzhava (Polish: Połonina Borżawska; Ukrainian: Полонина Боржава) → c7
- Polonyna Kuk (Polish: Połonina Kuk; Ukrainian: Полонина Кук) → c8
- Red Polonyna (Polish: Połonina Czerwona; Ukrainian: Полонина Красна)→ c9
- Svydovets (Polish: Świdowiec; Ukrainian: Свидовець) → c10
- Chornohora (Polish: Czarnohora; Ukrainian: Чорногора) → c11
- Hryniavy Mountains (Polish: Połoniny Hryniawskie; Ukrainian: Гриняви) → c12

== See also ==
- Divisions of the Carpathians
- Wooded Carpathians
- Polonyna (montane meadow)
- Ukrainian Carpathians
- Romanian Carpathians
- E8 European long distance path

== Sources ==
- Földvary, Gábor Z. (1988). Geology of the Carpathian Region. Singapore: World Scientific Publishing Company. ISBN 9789813103825.
- Tasenkevich, Lydia (2009). "Polonynas: Highlands Pastures in the Ukrainian Carpathians". Grasslands in Europe: Of High Nature Value. Zeist: KNNV Publishing. pp. 203–208. ISBN 9789004278103.
