= Petros (Chornohora) =

Mountain peak in Ukraine

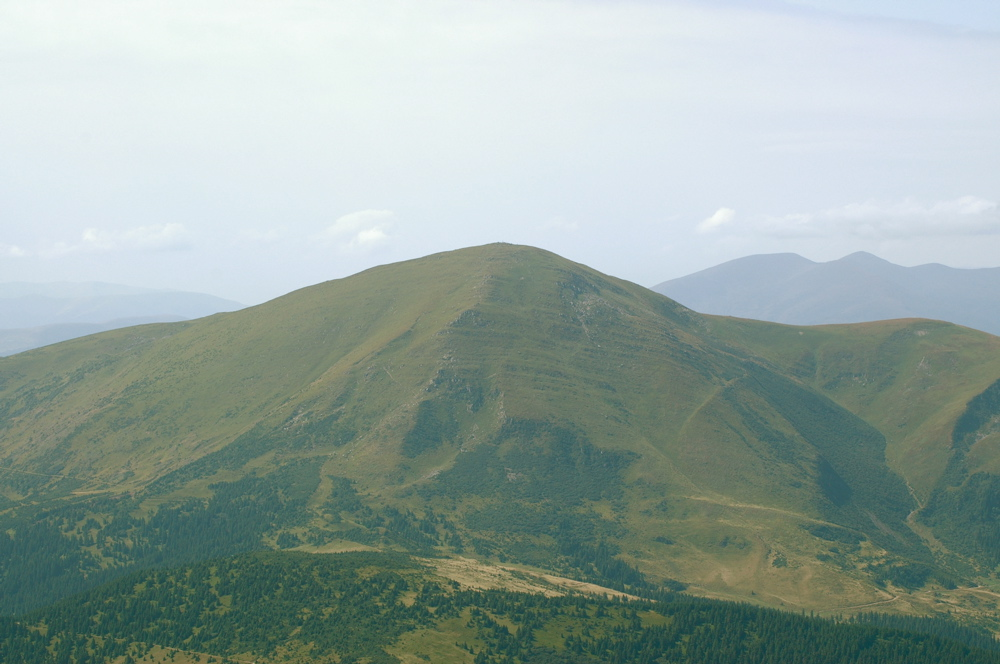

Highest point
- Elevation: 2,020 m (6,630 ft)
- Coordinates: 48°10′22″N 24°25′16″E

Geography
- Location within Ukraine
- Parent range: Carpathian Mountains

Petros (Ukrainian: Петрос) is a peak in the Chornohora region of Ukraine, with a height of 2,020 meters above sea level.
