= Bert (mountain) =

Mountain in Ukraine

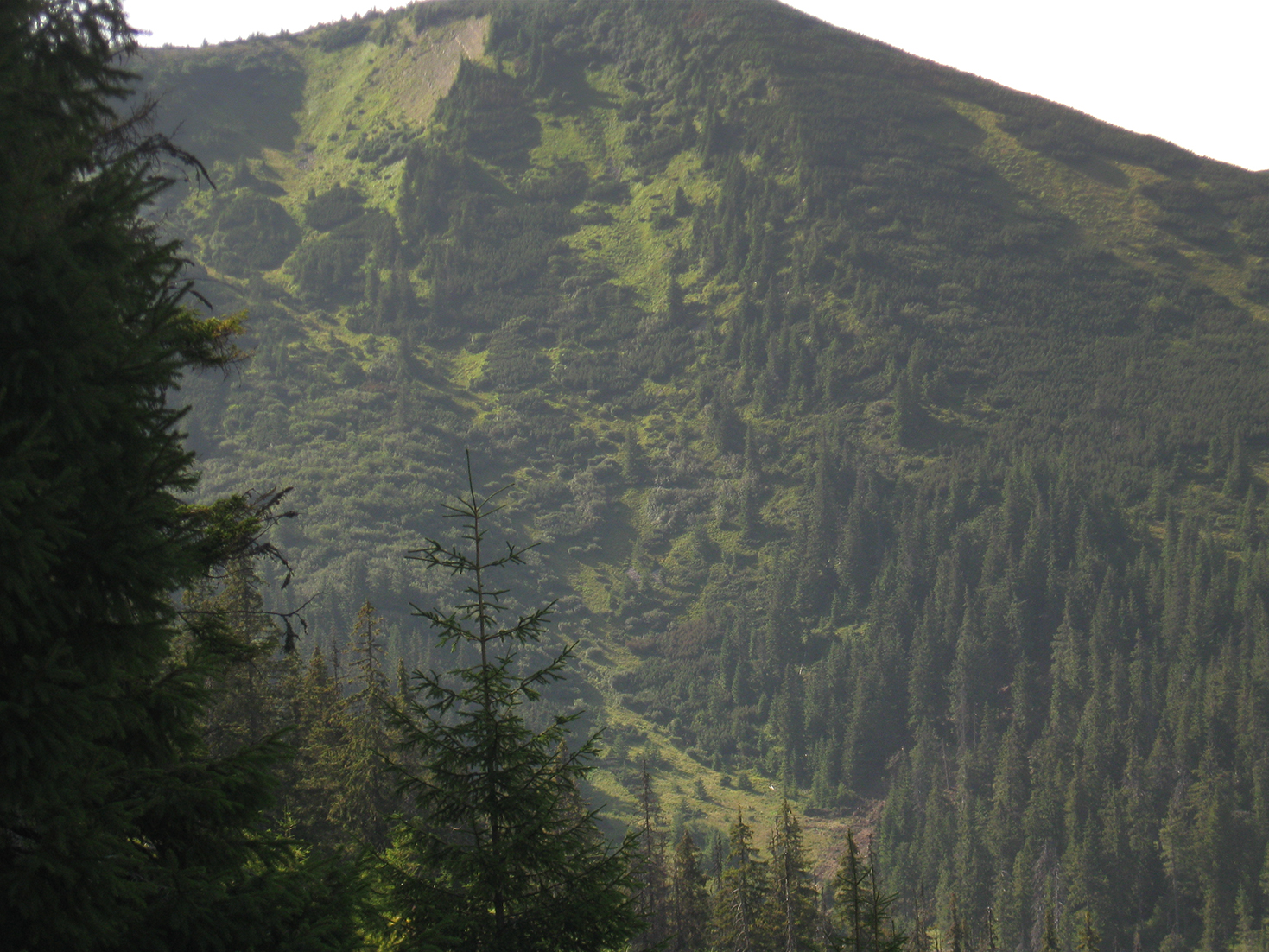
- View of Bert from the southeast

Highest point
- Elevation: 1,666 m (5,466 ft)
- Coordinates: 48°27′36″N 23°59′27″E

Geography
- Location within Ukraine
- Location: Ukraine
- Country: Ukraine
- Parent range: Gorgany

Bert (Ukrainian: Берть) is a 1,666-metre (5,466 ft) peak located in the Gorgany mountain range of Carpathian Mountains in western Ukraine. It is situated near Lopukhiv in Zakarpattia Oblast.
