= Breskul =

Mountain in Ukraine

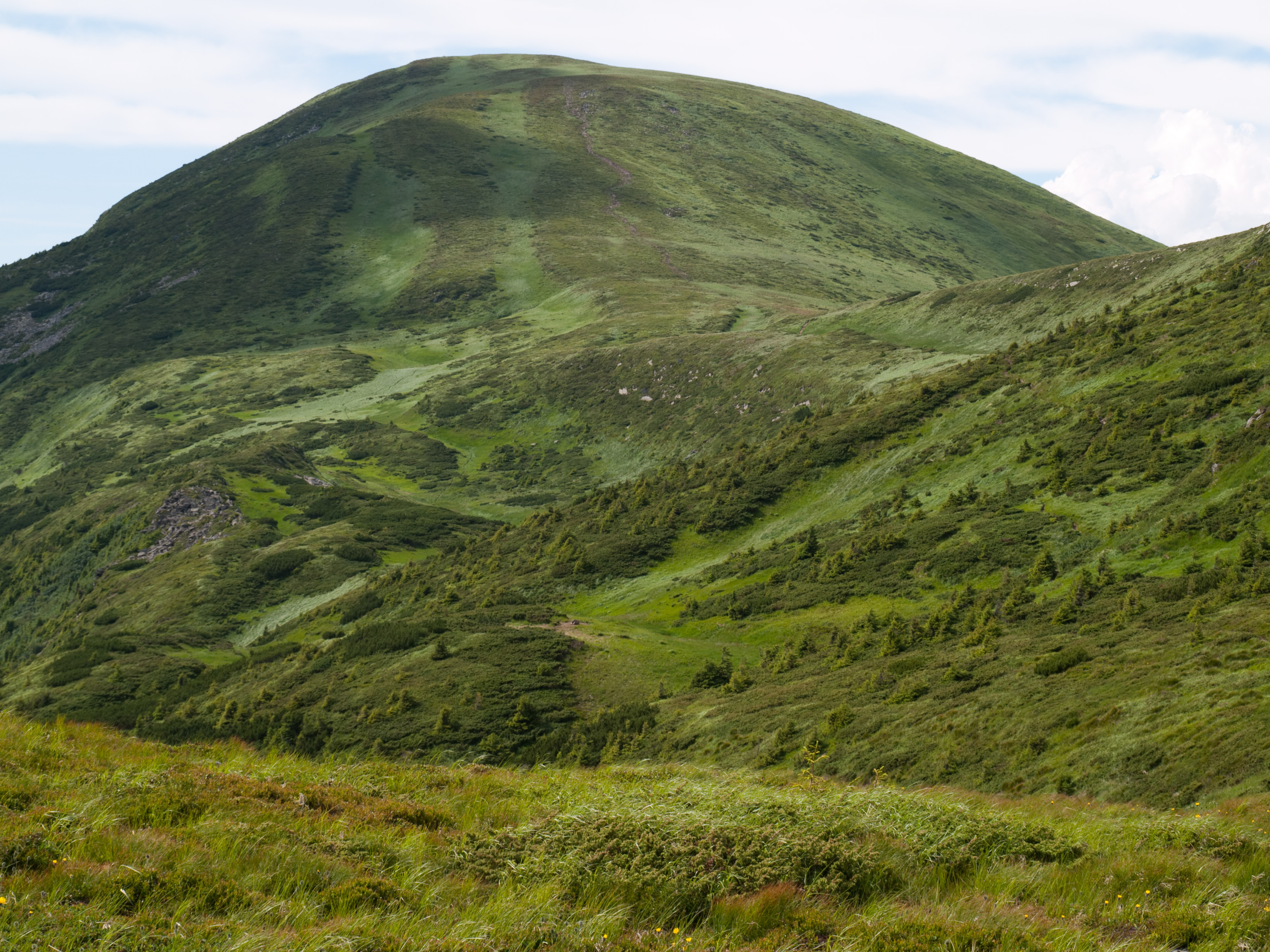
- View of Breskul

Highest point
- Elevation: 1,911 m (6,270 ft)
- Coordinates: 48°09′04″N 24°30′43″E

Geography
- Location within Ukraine
- Location: Ukraine
- Country: Ukraine
- Parent range: Chornohora

Breskul (Ukrainian: Брескул) is a 1,911-metre (6,270 ft) peak located in the Chornohora (Чорногора) mountain range of Carpathian Mountains in west Ukraine. It is situated on the border of Ivano-Frankivsk and Zakarpattia Oblasts, between the mountains Hoverla and Pozhyzhevska. Breskul is Hoverla's closest neighbor.

The top of the mountain is dome-shaped, on the northern slope (Breskulets spur) there are steep screes. In several places, the slopes are cut by the cirques of ancient glaciation. Covered with alpine and subalpine vegetation (grasses, flowers and shrubs), erosion is developing.
