= Chornohora =

Mountain range in Ukraine

Coordinates: 48.1603°N 24.5003°E

Chornohora, marked in red and labeled with C11

Chornohora (Ukrainian: Чорногора, lit. 'black mountain') is the highest mountain range in Western Ukraine. It is within the Polonynian Beskids, a subgroup of the mountain group of Eastern Beskids, which in turn is part of the Outer Eastern Carpathians.

== Description ==
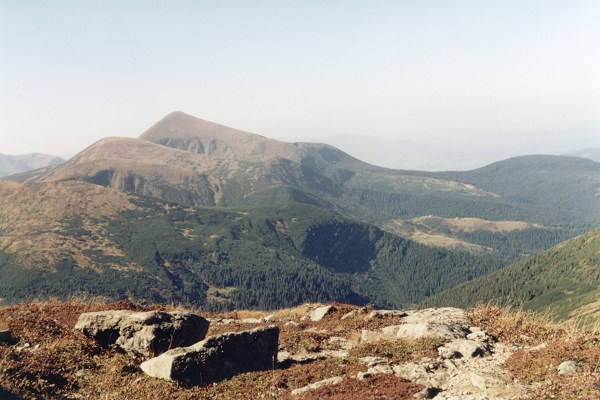
North part of Chornohora with Hoverla

The range is located on the administrative border between Ivano-Frankivsk and Zakarpattia oblasts. It is adjacent to the Gorgany range. The highest peak of Chornohora is Hoverla (2,061 m) with other high peaks including Pip Ivan (2,022 m) and Petros (2,020 m). The mountains are made of flysch rock.

The major part of the range forms the watershed between the Prut and Tysa River. The lower parts of Chornohora are inhabited by Hutsuls, whose primary occupation is herding. Major tourist centres of Chornohora are Bystrets, Dzembronia, Rakhiv, Verkhovyna, Vorokhta and Yasinia.

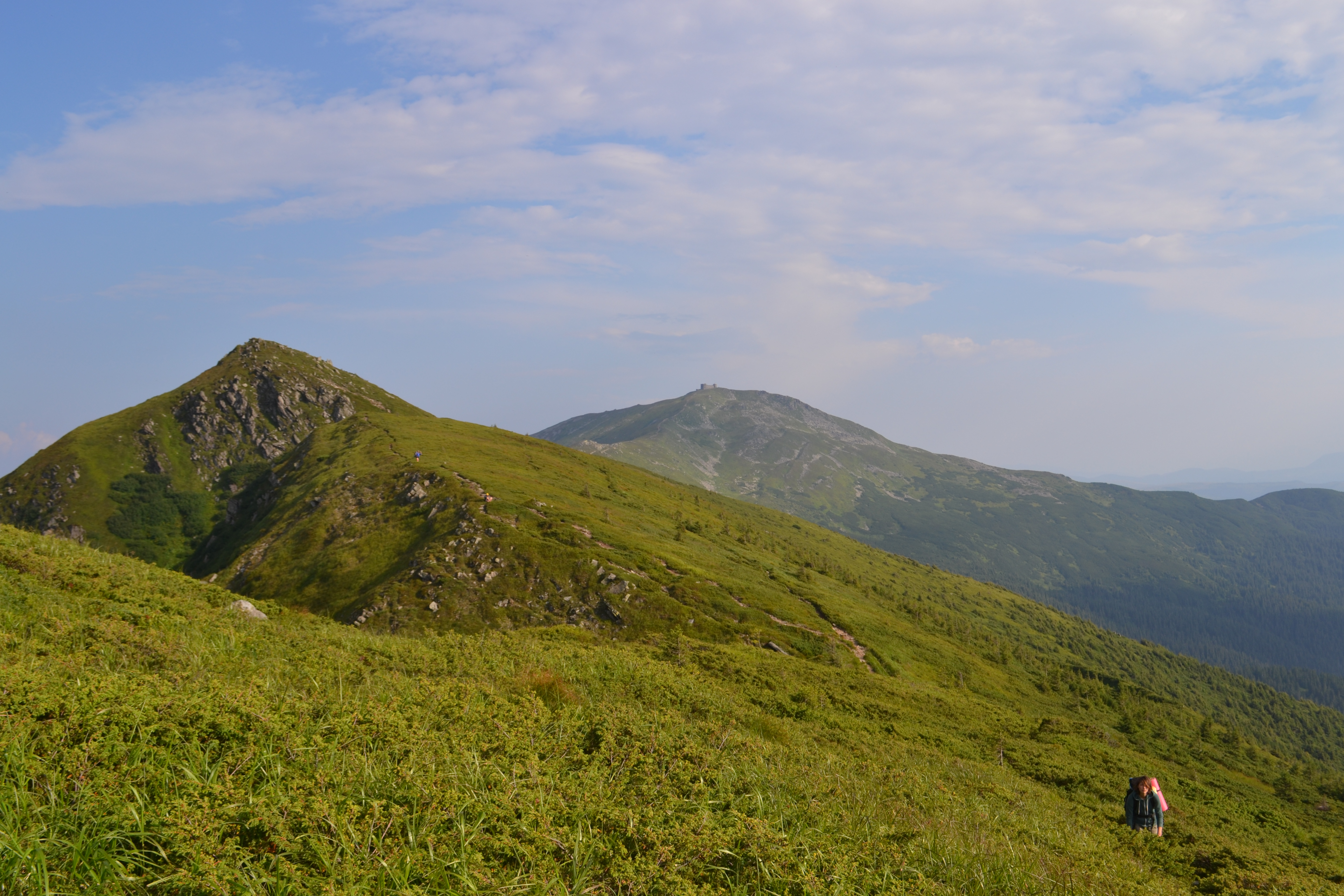
The South part of Chornohora with Pip Ivan mountain

In 1968 on the southern macroslope was established the Carpathian Biosphere Reserve, and in 1980 on the northern macroslope the Carpathian National Nature Park.

== List of peaks ==
- Menchul
- Hoverla
- Pip Ivan
- Petros
- Hutyn Tomnatyk
- Staiky
- Homul
- Shuryn
- Pozhyzhevska
- Breskul
- Dantser
- Shpytsi
- Brebeneskul
- Rebra
- Turkul

== See also ==
- Divisions of the Carpathians
- Ukrainian Carpathians
- Wooded Carpathians
- Polonynian Beskids
- Polonyna (montane meadow)

== Sources ==
- Földvary, Gábor Z. (1988). Geology of the Carpathian Region. Singapore: World Scientific Publishing Company. ISBN 9789813103825.
- Tasenkevich, Lydia (2009). "Polonynas: Highlands Pastures in the Ukrainian Carpathians". Grasslands in Europe: Of High Nature Value. Zeist: KNNV Publishing. pp. 203–208. ISBN 9789004278103.
