= Turkul =

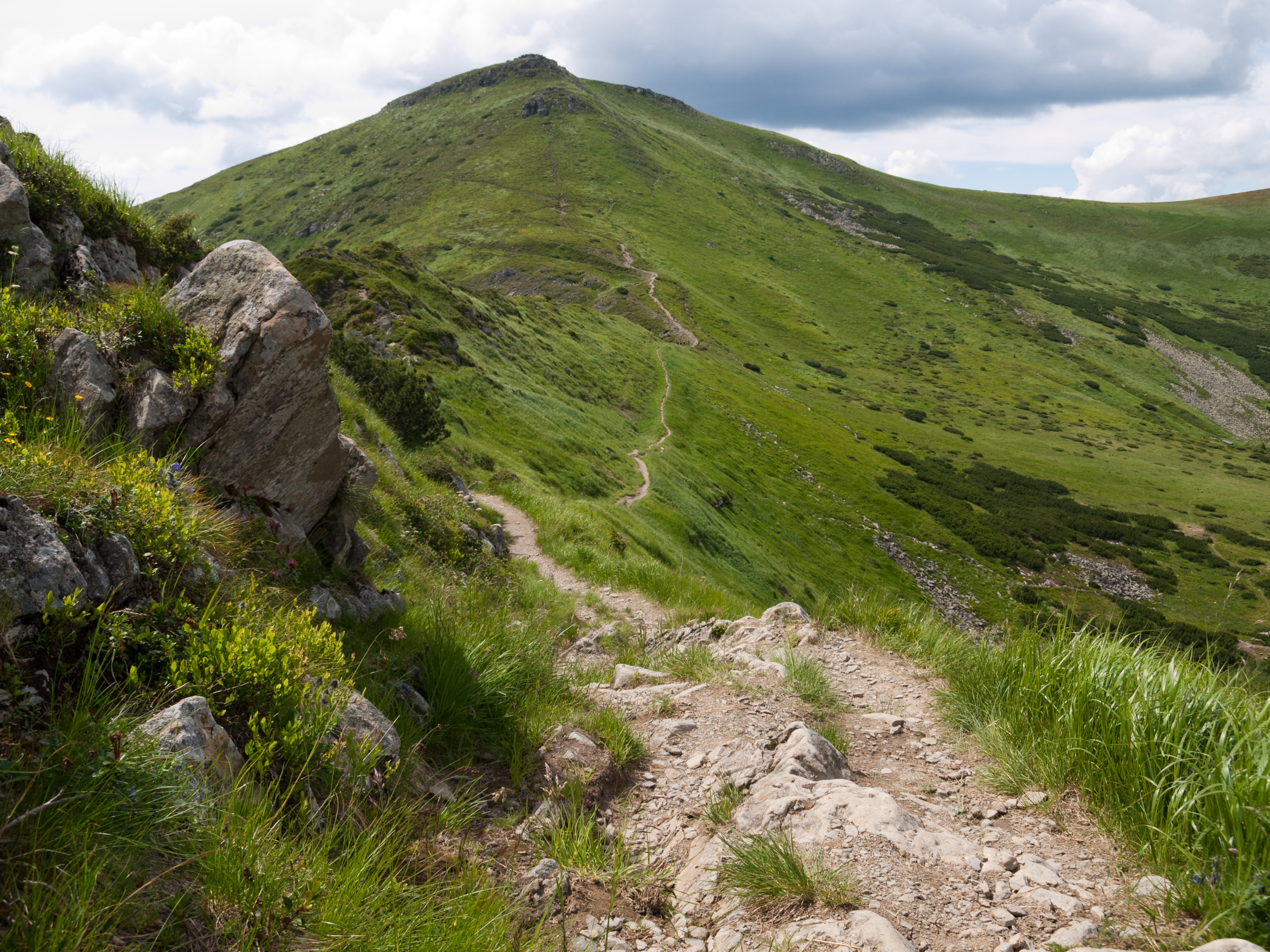
- Turkul

Highest point
- Elevation: 1,933 m (6,342 ft)
- Coordinates: 48°07′26″N 24°31′52″E

Geography
- Location within Ukraine
- Location: Ukraine
- Country: Ukraine
- Parent range: Chornohora

Turkul (Ukrainian: Туркул) is a 1,933-metre (6,342 ft) peak located in the Chornohora (Чорногора) mountain range of Carpathian Mountains in west Ukraine. It is situated between the Dancer (1850 m) in the north and Rebra (2001 m) in the southeast. The western slopes fall into the valley of the Ozirny Stream, south to the valley of the Butynyc stream, and to the northeastern to the glacier basin where Lake Nesamovyte lies. The back ridge from the summit in the southwest direction occupies Turkulska alpine meadow.

Trenches from the First World War have survived. In the inter-war period, the border between Poland and Czechoslovakia was crossed by the peak (border post No. 33). Turkuł is a good viewpoint for the nearby summits of Chornohora and for further mountain ranges.

== Gallery ==
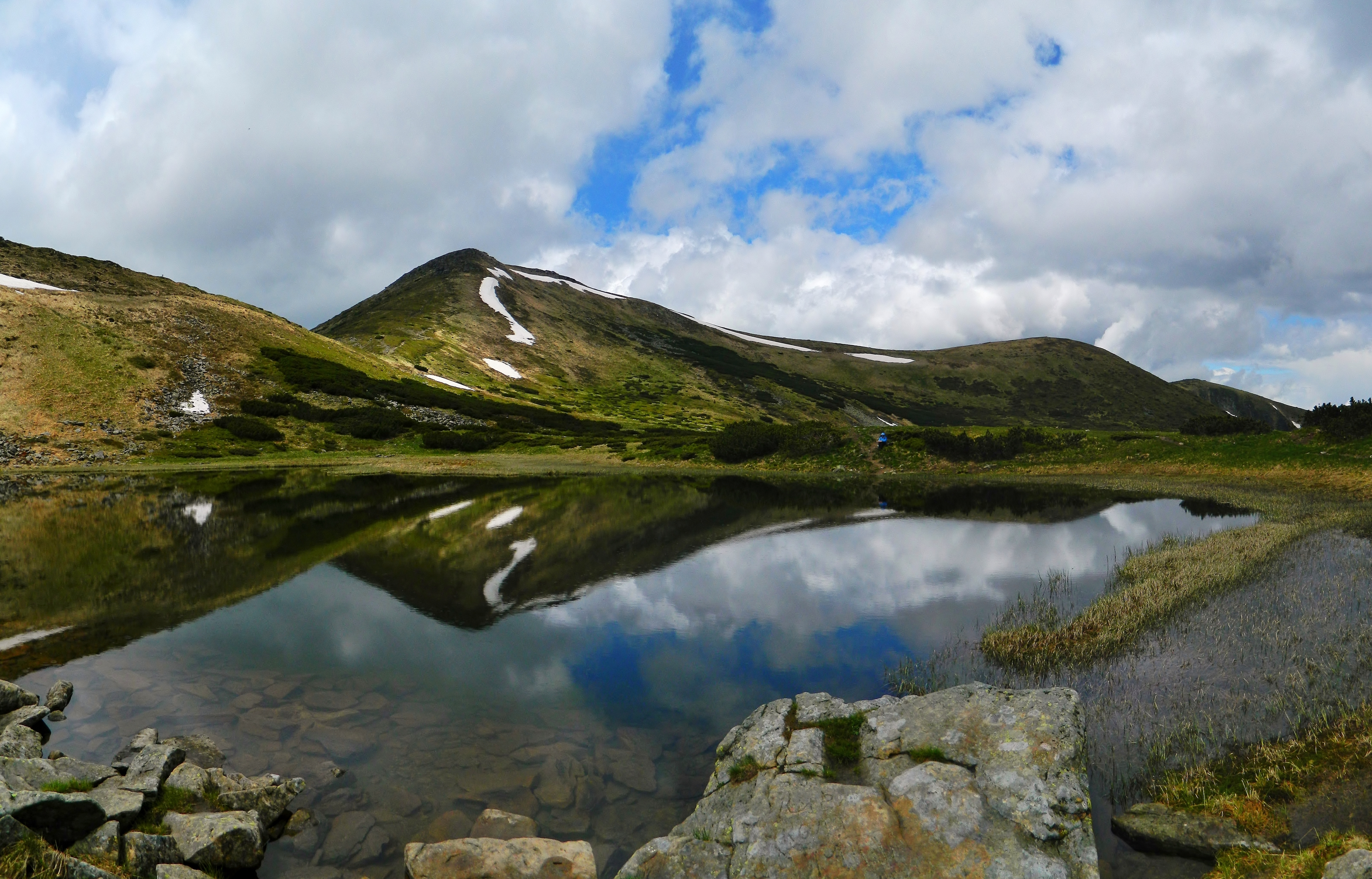
