= Rebra (peak) =

Mountain in Ukraine

- Ребра
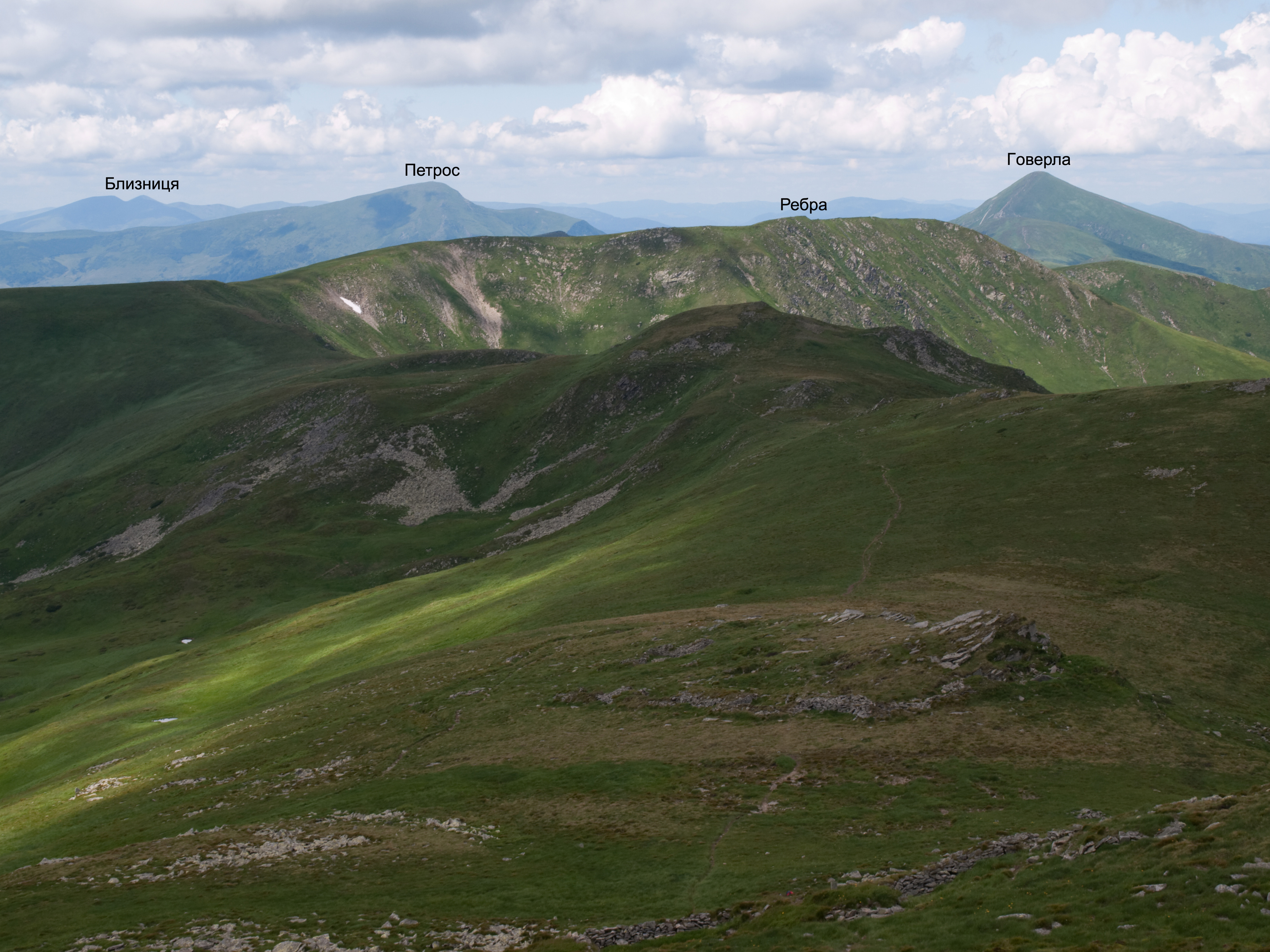

Highest point
- Elevation: 2,001 m (6,565 ft)
- Coordinates: 48°06′41″N 24°33′36″E

Geography
- Location within Ukraine
- Parent range: Carpathian Mountains

Rebra (Ukrainian: Ребра) is a peak in the Chornohora region of Ukraine, with a height of 2,001 meters above sea level.
