= Zeytin-Kosh =

Mountain in Crimea

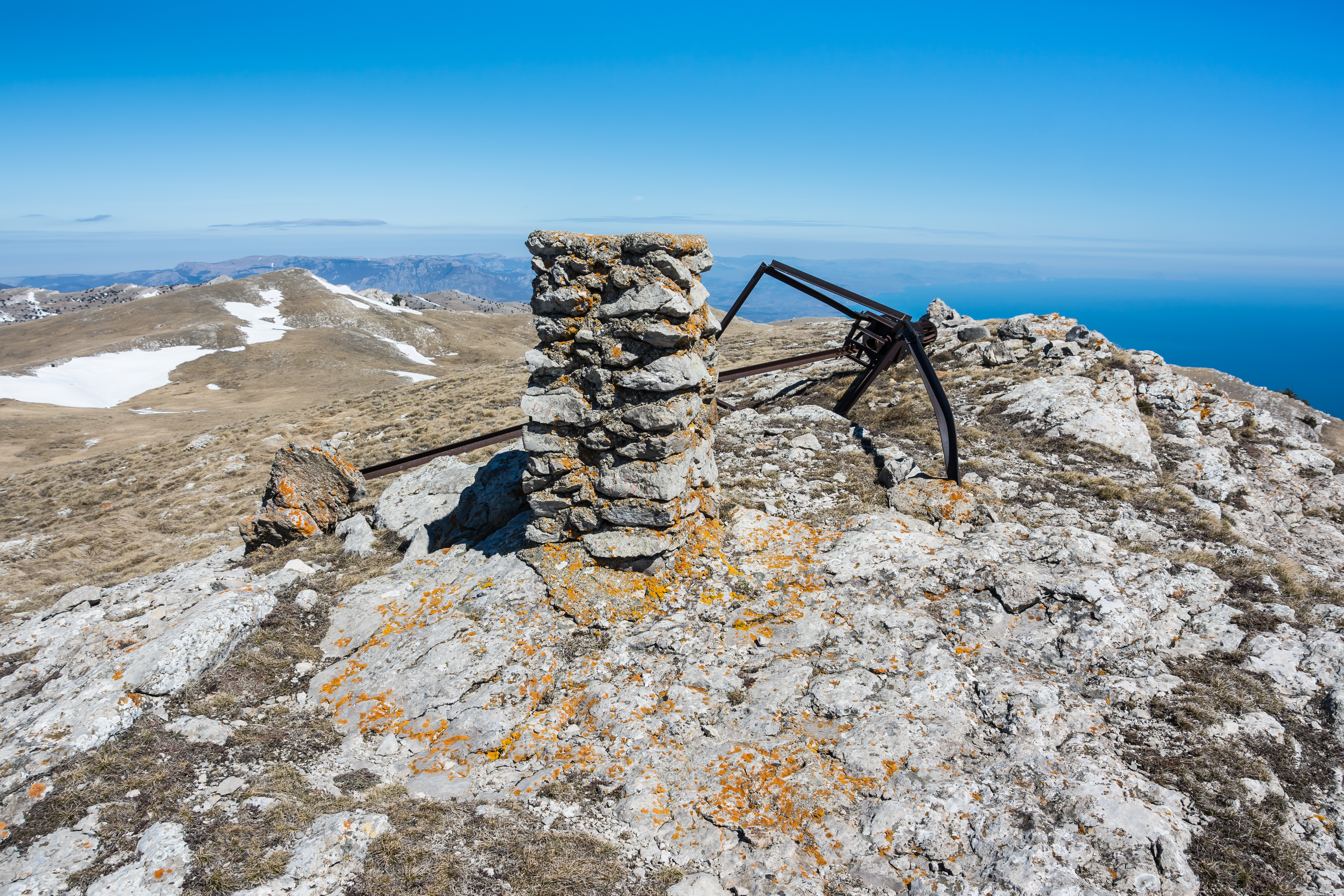
- Top of Zeytin-Kosh

Highest point
- Elevation: 1,537 m (5,043 ft)
- Coordinates: 44°37′04″N 34°16′58″E

Geography
- Location within Crimea
- Countries: Disputed: Ukraine (de jure); Russia (de facto)
- Parent range: Crimean Mountains

Zeytin-Kosh (Note: Ukrainian: Зейтін-Кош; Russian: Зейтин-Кош; Crimean Tatar: Zeytin Qoş) is a mountain in Crimea and the third highest mountain in the Crimean Mountains. Its height stands at 1,537 metres (5,043 ft) above sea level.

== Etymology ==
The name of the mountain is of Crimean Tatar origin and literally means "olive kosh" (zeytün or in the southern coast dialect zeytin - "olive, olive tree"; qoş - "koshara, sheepfold").
