= Gorgany =

Mountain range in Western Ukraine

Coordinates: 48°30′N 24°00′E

Gorgany, marked in red and labeled as C4

Gorgany (Ukrainian: Ґорґани) is a mountain range in Outer Eastern Carpathians in Western Ukraine, adjacent to Chornohora range and forming part of the Beskids. The highest peak of Gorgany is Syvulia (1,836 m) with the other high peaks including Ihrovyshche, Vysoka (1,804 m), Lopushna (1,772 m) and Grofa. The mountains are made of flysch rock, mostly sandstone, which create debris fields (local names: gorgan, grekhit, tsekota) typical for Gorgany. They are bordered by the Mizunka River and Vyshkiv Pass in the west and the Prut River and Yablunytsia Pass in the east.

== Geography ==
The heights of the range vary between 1,400 and 1,800 meters. Many summits are separated with deep chasms. The highest mountains are covered with large fields of sandstone rock fragments, with some of such areas covering a territory of up to 5 square kilometers. Slopes of the highest summits preserve traces of glaciation. The range is dissected by rivers Mizunka, Svicha, Chechva, Limnytsia, Bystrytsia Nadvirnianska, Bystrytsia Solotvynska and Prut. The river valleys are narrow and steep, reaching the depth of 1,000 meters, and contain numerous cataracts and waterfalls, such as Bukhtivets.

Over 80% of the range's area is covered with forest, most of it spruce. The heights above 1,450-1,500 meters are covered with dwarf pine. The area of polonynas in Gorgany is smaller than in other areas of Ukrainian Carpathians.

A transitional area between Gorgany and Polonynian Beskids is located along the upper part of Tereblia river in Transcarpathia. The highest peaks in the area are Kanch (1,583 m), Strimba (1,723 m) and Streminis (1,599 m).

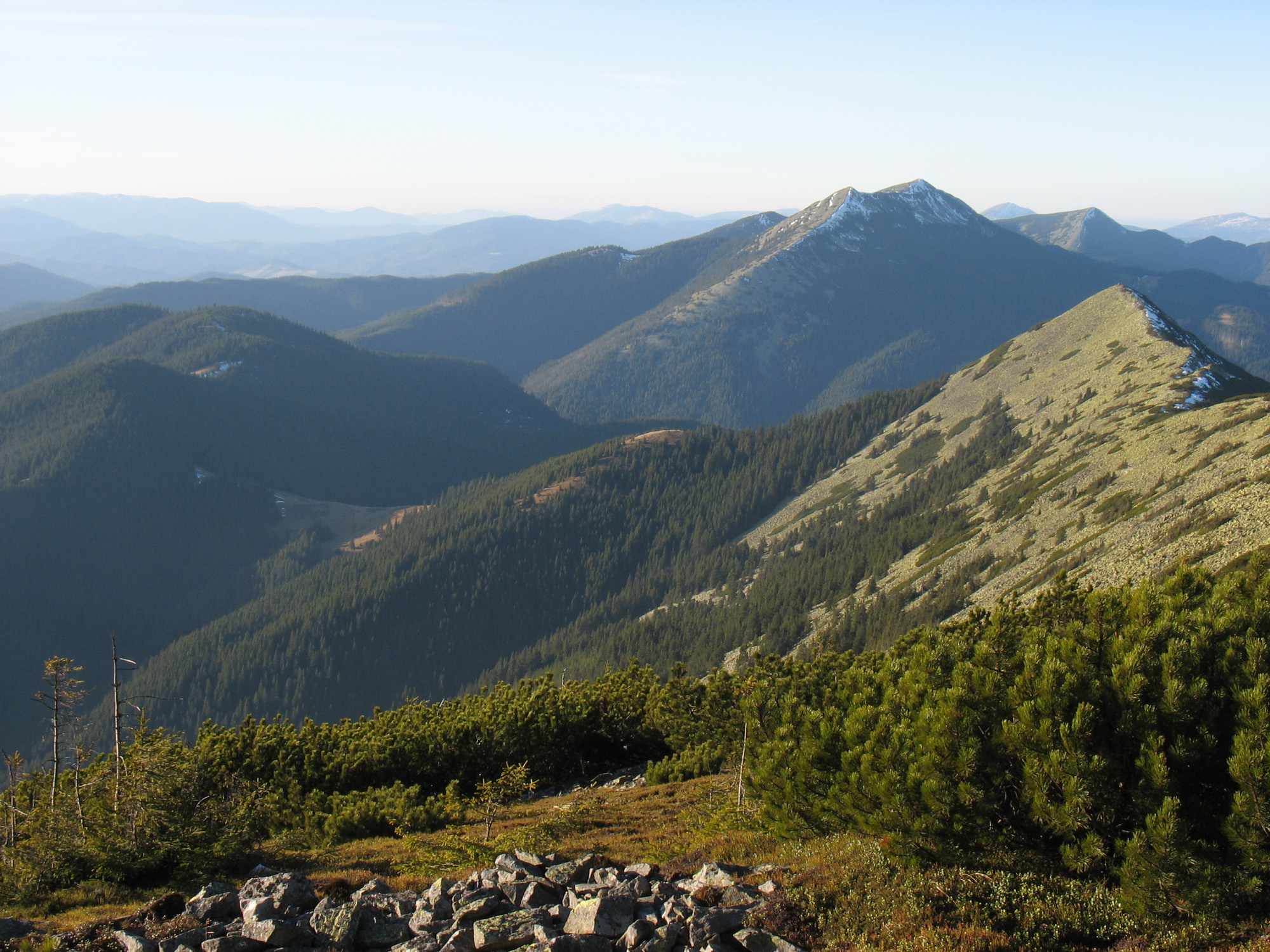
Gorgany Nature Reserve

=== Major peaks (west to east) ===
- Gorgan Vyshkivskyi (Ґорґан Вишківський) - 1,448 m
- Grofa (Ґрофа) - 1,752 m
- Popadia (Попадя) - 1,742 m
- Syvulia (Сивуля) - 1,836 m
- Ihrovyshche (Ігровище) - 1,807 m
- Vysoka (Висока) - 1,805 m
- Doboshanka (Добошанка) - 1,757 m
- Syniak (Синяк) - 1,664 m
- Khomyak (Хом’як) - 1,544 m

== Population and infrastructure ==
Gorgany is the least populated part of the Ukrainian Carpathians. The western parts of the range are inhabited by Boykos, whose primary occupation is herding and timber exploitation. The upper parts of the valleys of Bystrytsia Nadvirnianska and Prut are populated by Hutsuls, whose main centres include Nadvirna and Deliatyn. Popular resort areas are located in the towns of Vorokhta, Yaremche and Mykulychyn. Local industry is based on forestry, with a net of narrow-gauge railways connecting mountain areas with sawmills in Vyhoda, Broshniv-Osada, Nadvirna and other locations. Additionally, oil production is located in Bytkiv, Pasichna and Ripne. A railway line through Tatariv crosses Gorgany, connecting the Prut valley with Transcarpathia.

== Gallery ==
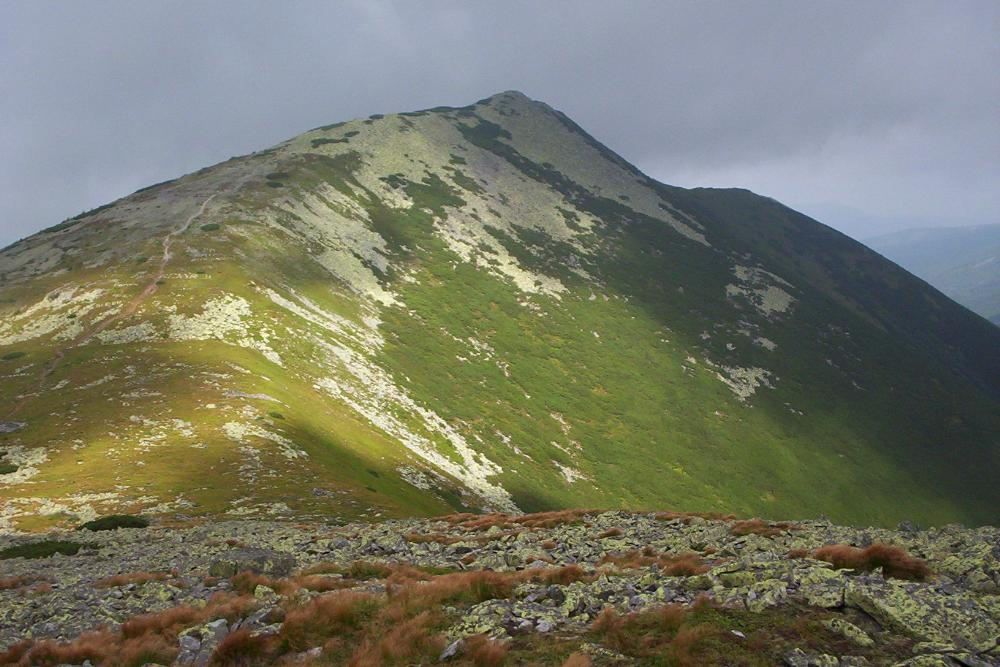
Syvulia

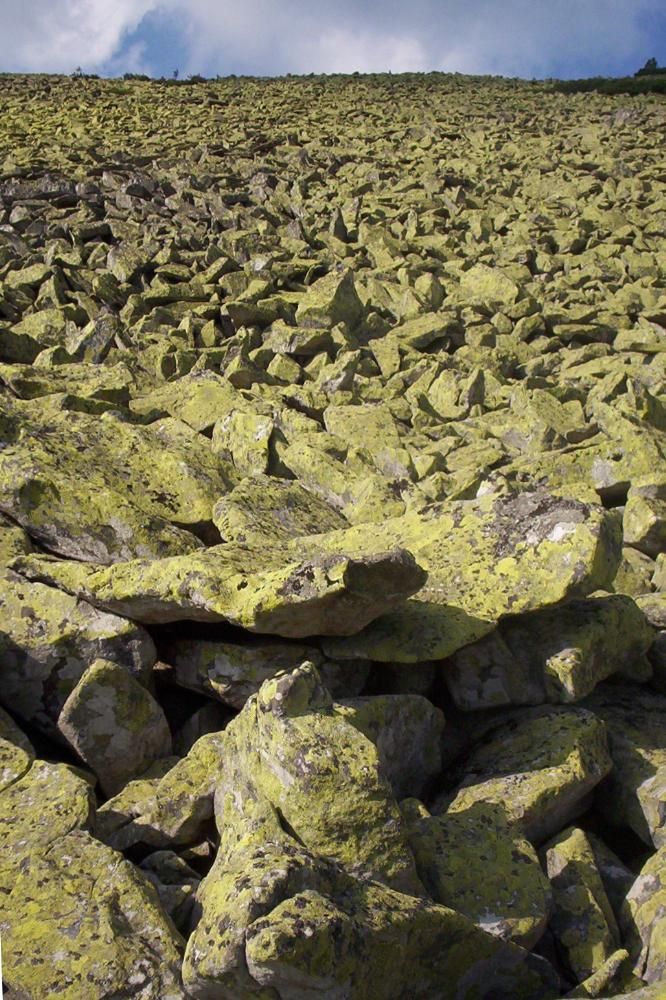
Debris field (gorgan)

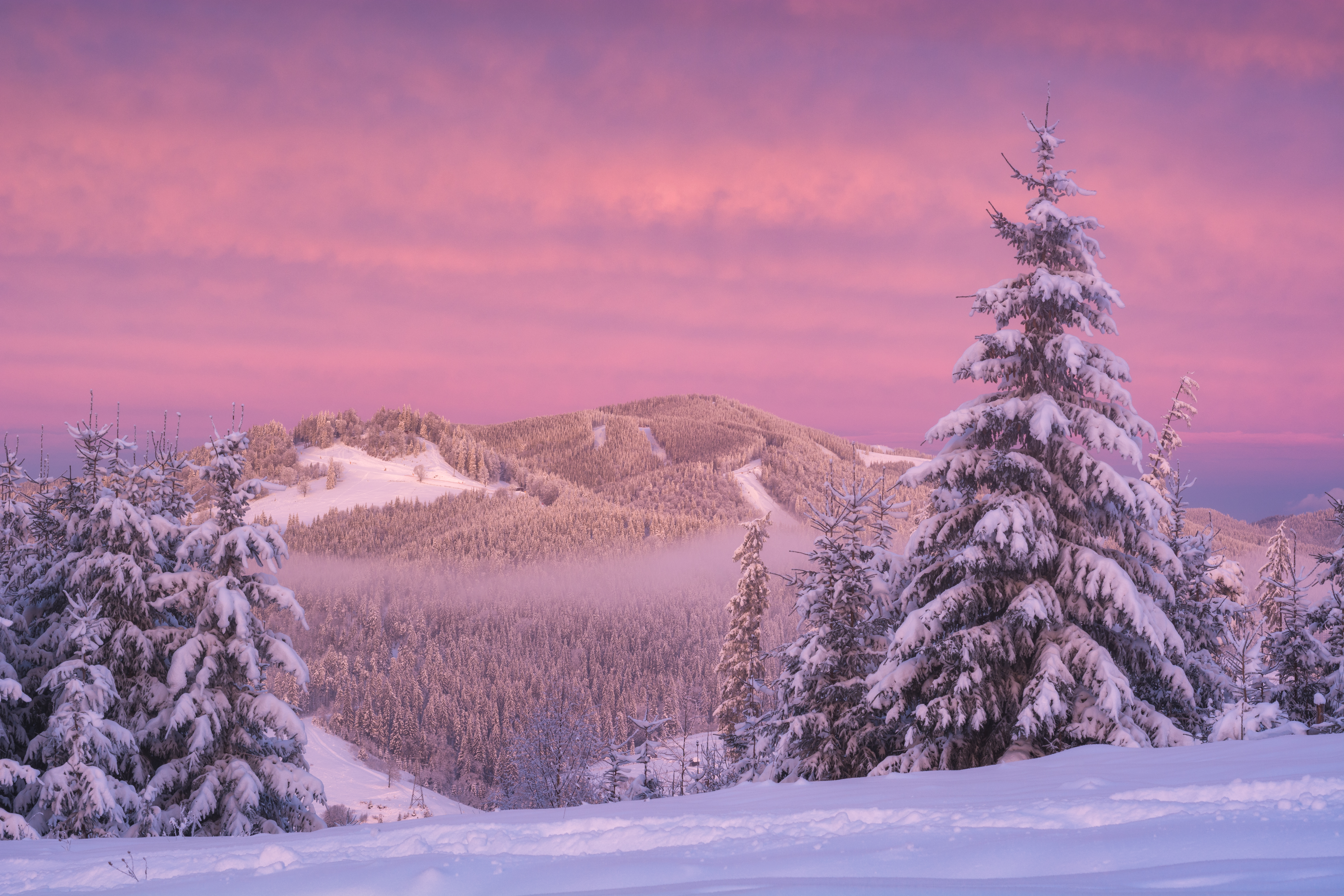
Pink morning in the Gorgany mountains, Ukraine.

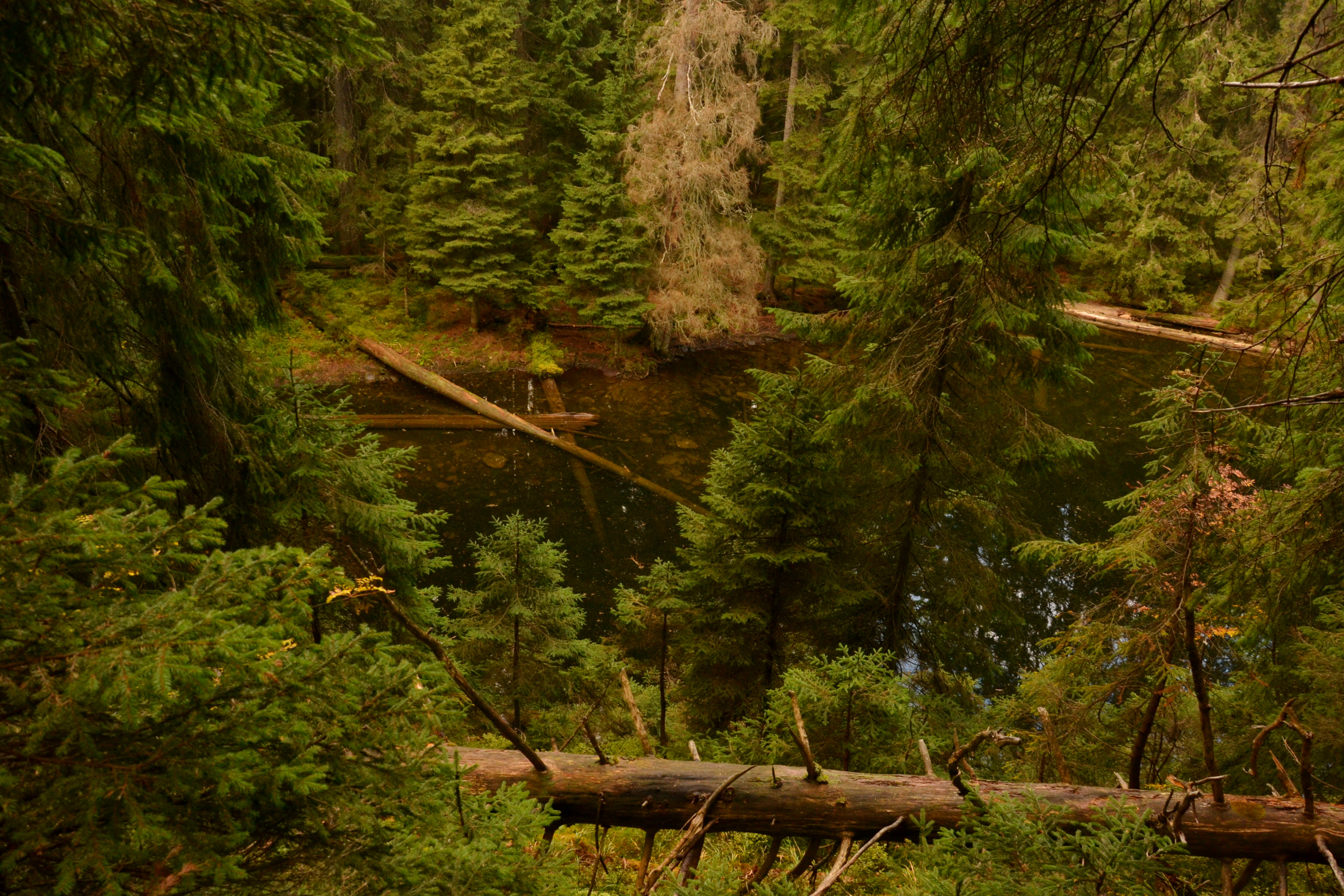
Lake at Arshytsia Range

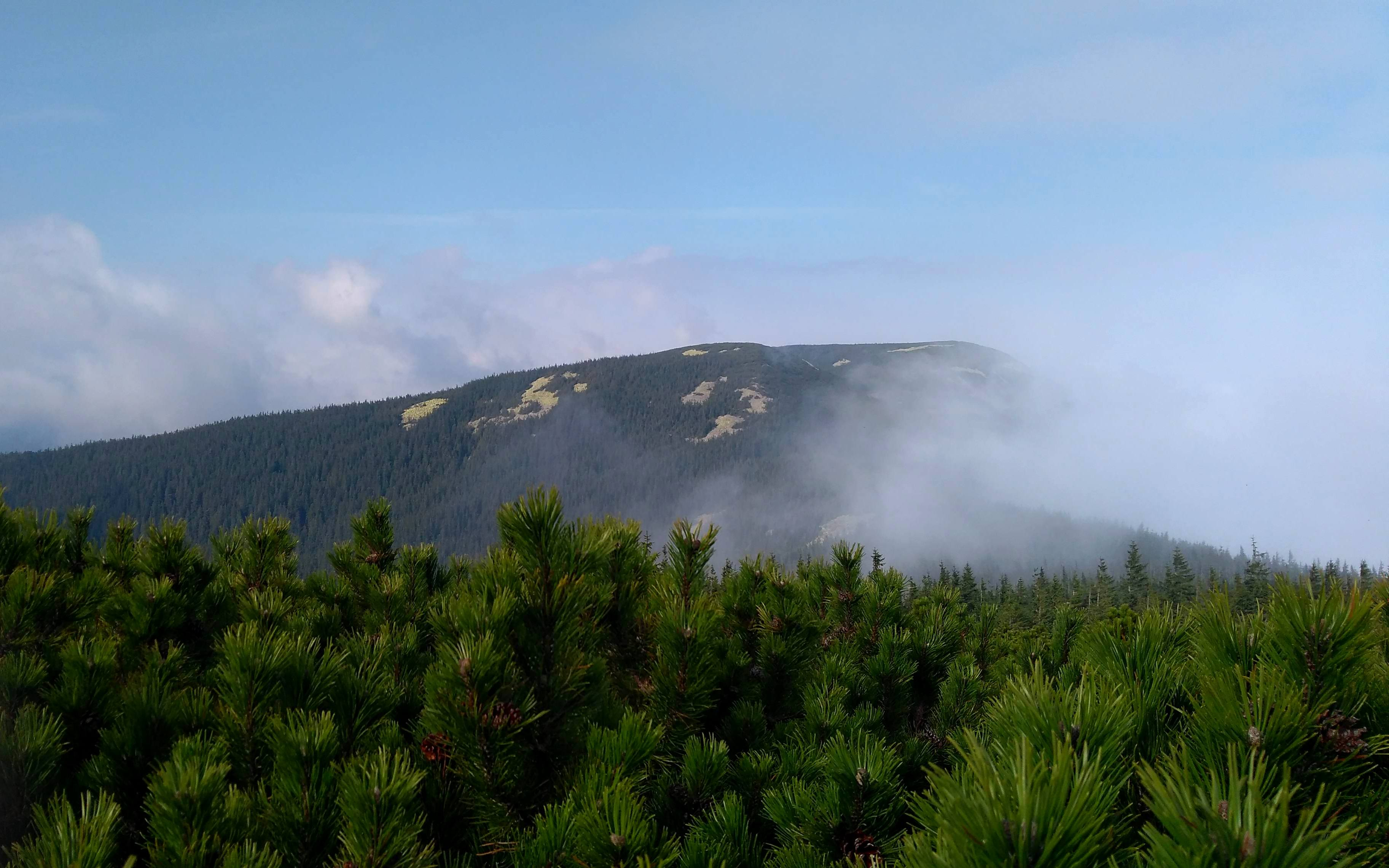
Central Gorgany

== Sources ==
- - official page
- Gorgany Race — 30-hour Adventure Race happening every year in Gorgany
- Gorgany
