= Hutyn Tomnatyk =

Mountain peak in Ukraine

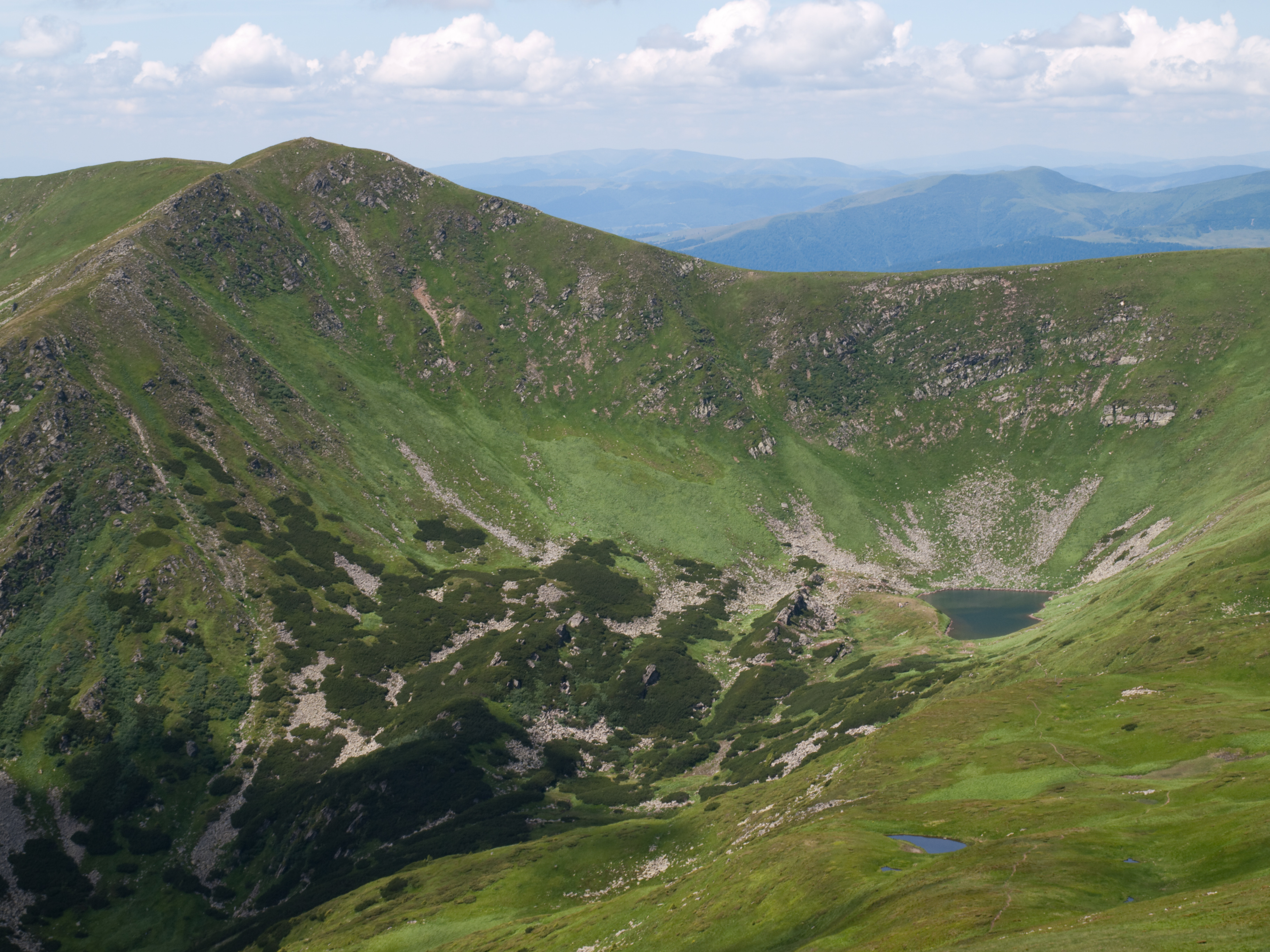

Highest point
- Elevation: 2,016 m (6,614 ft)
- Coordinates: 48°06′00″N 24°33′24″E

Geography
- Location within Ukraine Location within Ivano-Frankivsk Oblast Location within Zakarpattia Oblast
- Parent range: Carpathian Mountains

Hutyn Tomnatyk (Ukrainian: Гутин Томнатик) is a peak in the Chornohora region of Ukraine, with height of 2,016 meters above sea level.
