= Polonynian Beskids =

Group of mountain ranges in Ukraine

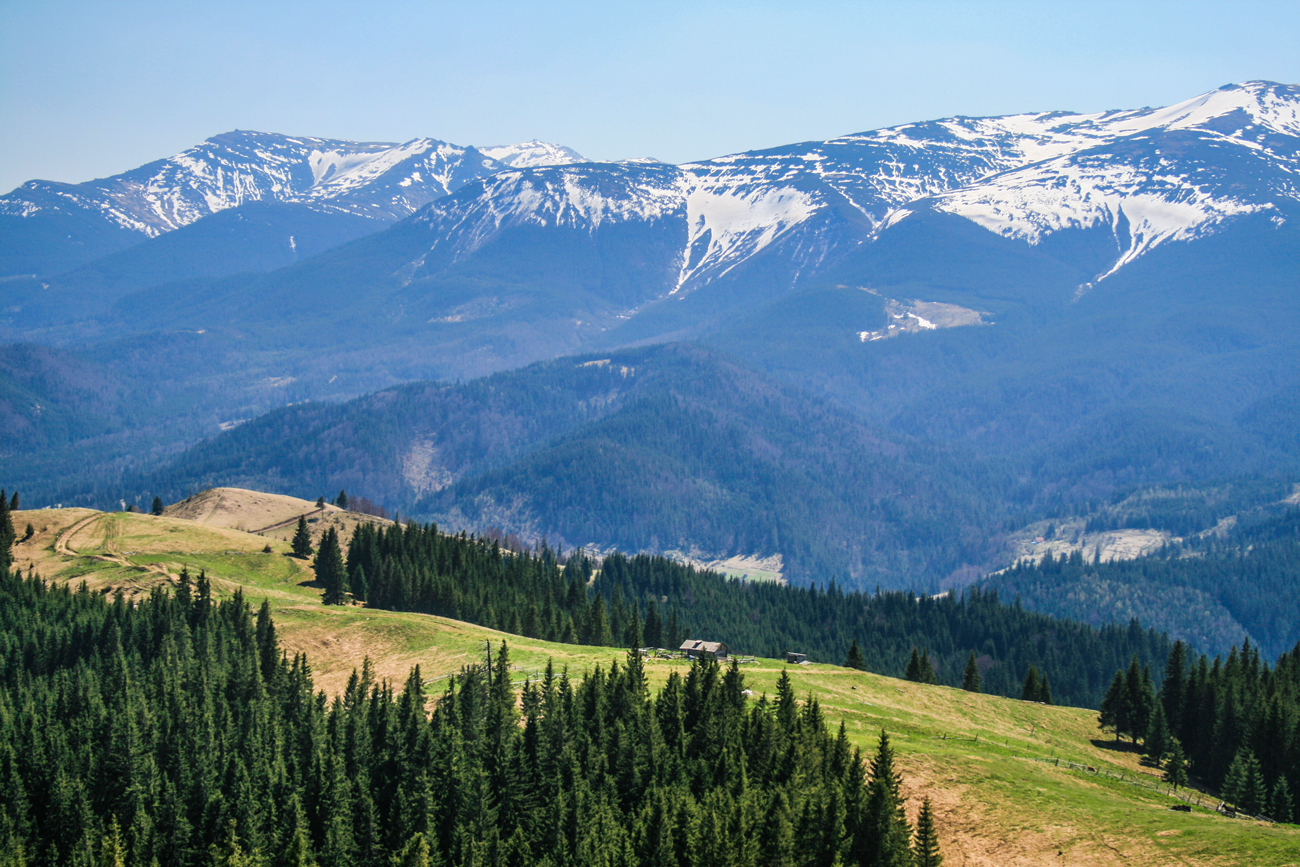
Mountain Chornohora

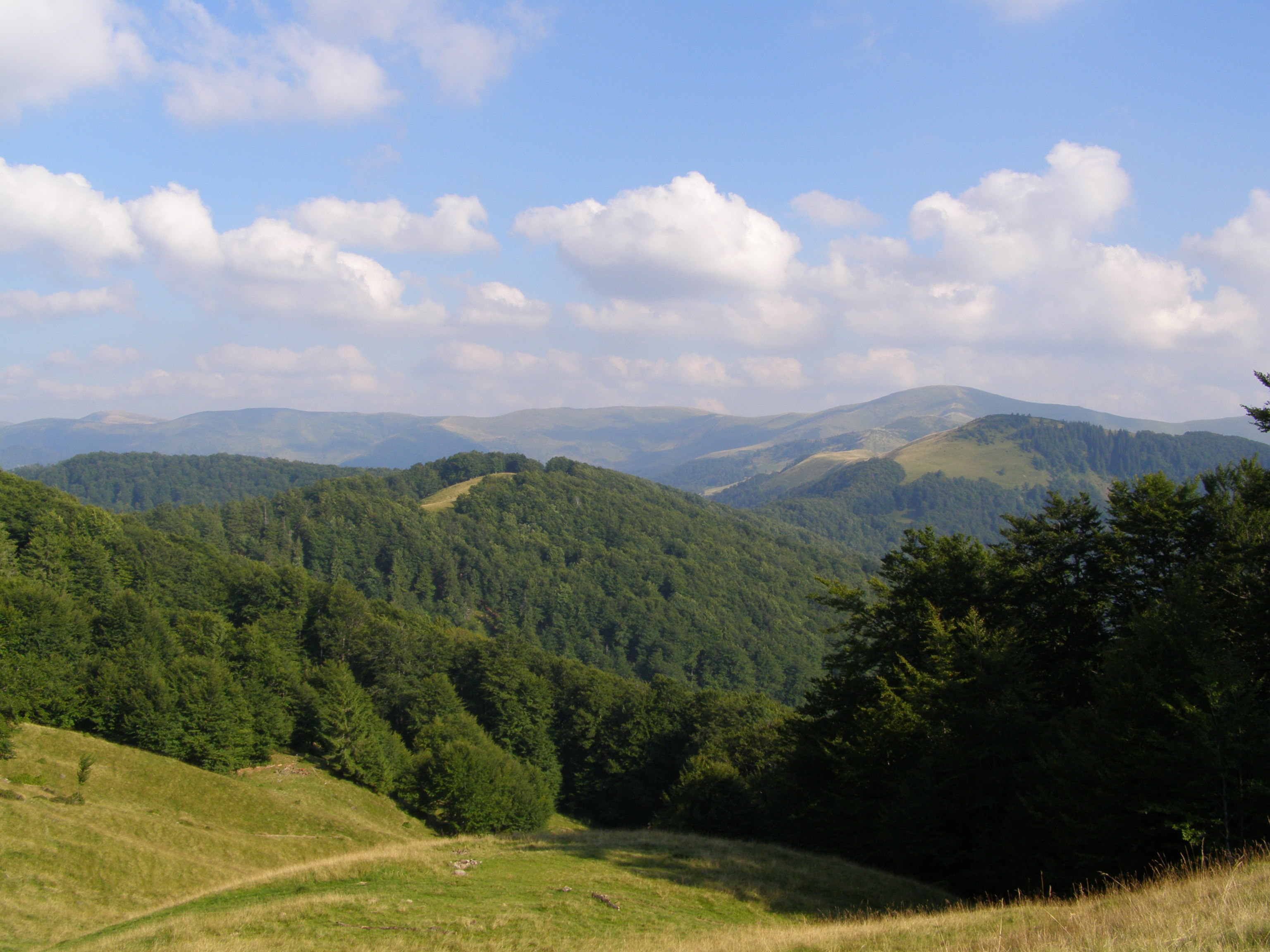
Mountain Svydovets

Polonynian Beskids or Polonyne Beskids (Ukrainian: Полонинські Бескиди; Polish: Beskidy Połonińskie) is a geological group of mountain ranges of the Eastern Beskids, within the Outer Eastern Carpathians. It is one of two parallel mountain ridges of the Eastern Beskids, situated in western parts of modern Ukraine. They are stretching parallel to the Wooded Beskids on the northeast, and Vihorlat-Gutin Area to the southwest.

The name of this mountain range is derived from Slavic term polonyna, designating a particular type of montane meadows, characteristic for those parts of the Carpathians. Thus, the very term polonyne or polonynian Beskids translates as Meadowed Beskids. In Polish and Ukrainian terminology, this range is most commonly called the "Polonynian Beskids" (Ukrainian: Полонинські Бескиди; Polish: Beskidy Połonińskie), while in Slovakia it is also defined in a much wider sense, under the local term Poloniny (Slovak: Poloniny). The territorial scope of all those terms varies in accordance to different classifications and traditions.

== Subdivisions ==
Polonynian Beskids, marked in red color and labeled with letter C, from c6 to c12

Polonynian Beskids include:

- Smooth Polonyna (PL: Połonina Równa; UK: Полонина Рівна) → c6
- Polonyna Borzhava (PL: Połonina Borżawska; UK: Полонина Боржава) → c7
- Polonyna Kuk (PL: Połonina Kuk; UK: Полонина Кук) → c8
- Red Polonyna (PL: Połonina Czerwona; UK: Полонина Красна)→ c9
- Svydovets (PL: Świdowiec; UK: Свидівець) → c10
- Chornohora (PL: Czarnohora; UK: Чорногора) → c11
- Hrynyavy Mountains (PL: Połoniny Hryniawskie; UK: Гриняви) → c12

== See also ==
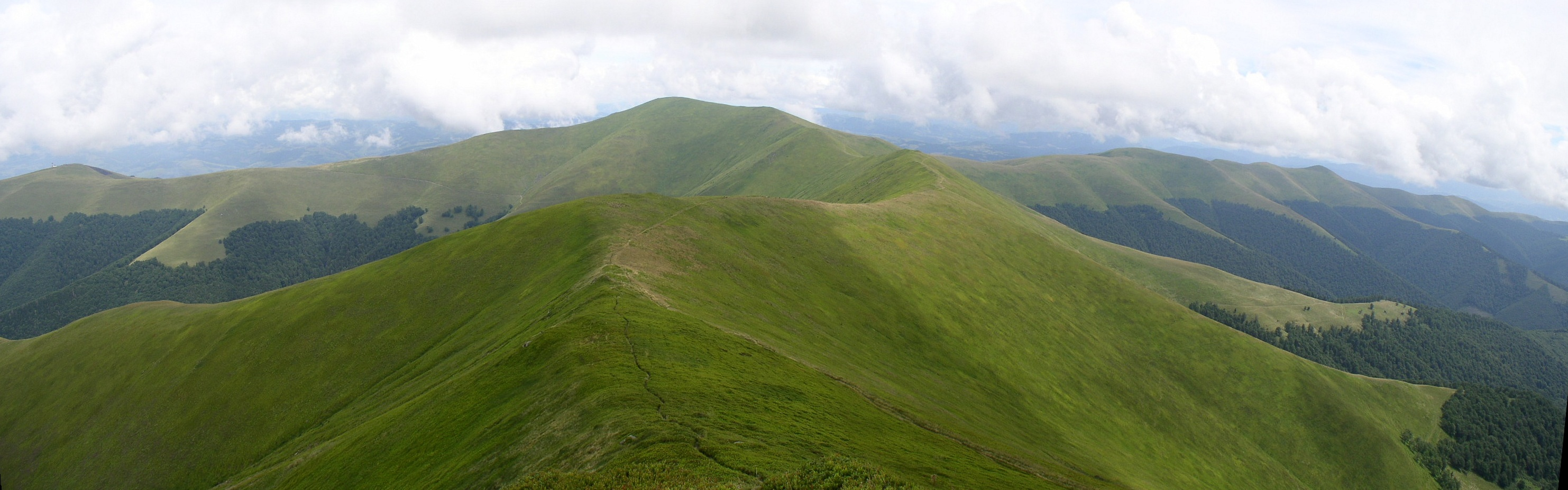
Polonyna Borzhava of the Polonynian Beskids

- Divisions of the Carpathians
- Wooded Carpathians
- Ukrainian Carpathians
- Polonyna (montane meadow)

== Sources ==
- Földvary, Gábor Z. (1988). Geology of the Carpathian Region. Singapore: World Scientific Publishing Company. ISBN 9789813103825.
- Tasenkevich, Lydia (2009). "Polonynas: Highlands Pastures in the Ukrainian Carpathians". Grasslands in Europe: Of High Nature Value. Zeist: KNNV Publishing. pp. 203–208. ISBN 9789004278103.
