= Brebeneskul =

Mountain in Ukraine

- Бребенескул
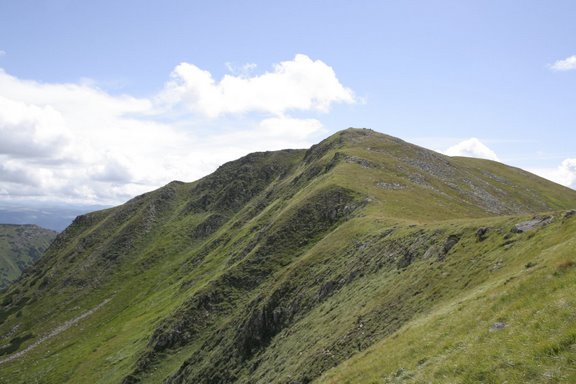

Highest point
- Elevation: 2,035 m (6,677 ft)
- Coordinates: 48°05′54″N 24°34′50″E

Geography
- Location within Zakarpattia Oblast Location within Ivano-Frankivsk Oblast Location within Ukraine
- Location: Zakarpattia Oblast–Ivano-Frankivsk Oblast border
- Country: Ukraine
- Parent range: Carpathian Mountains

Brebeneskul (Ukrainian: Бребенескул; Romanian: Brebenescul) is a peak in the Chornohora region of Ukraine, with a height of 2,035 meters above sea level. It is the second-highest peak in Ukraine.
