= Wooded Carpathians =

Group of mountain ranges in Ukraine

Coordinates: 48°09′37″N 24°30′01″E

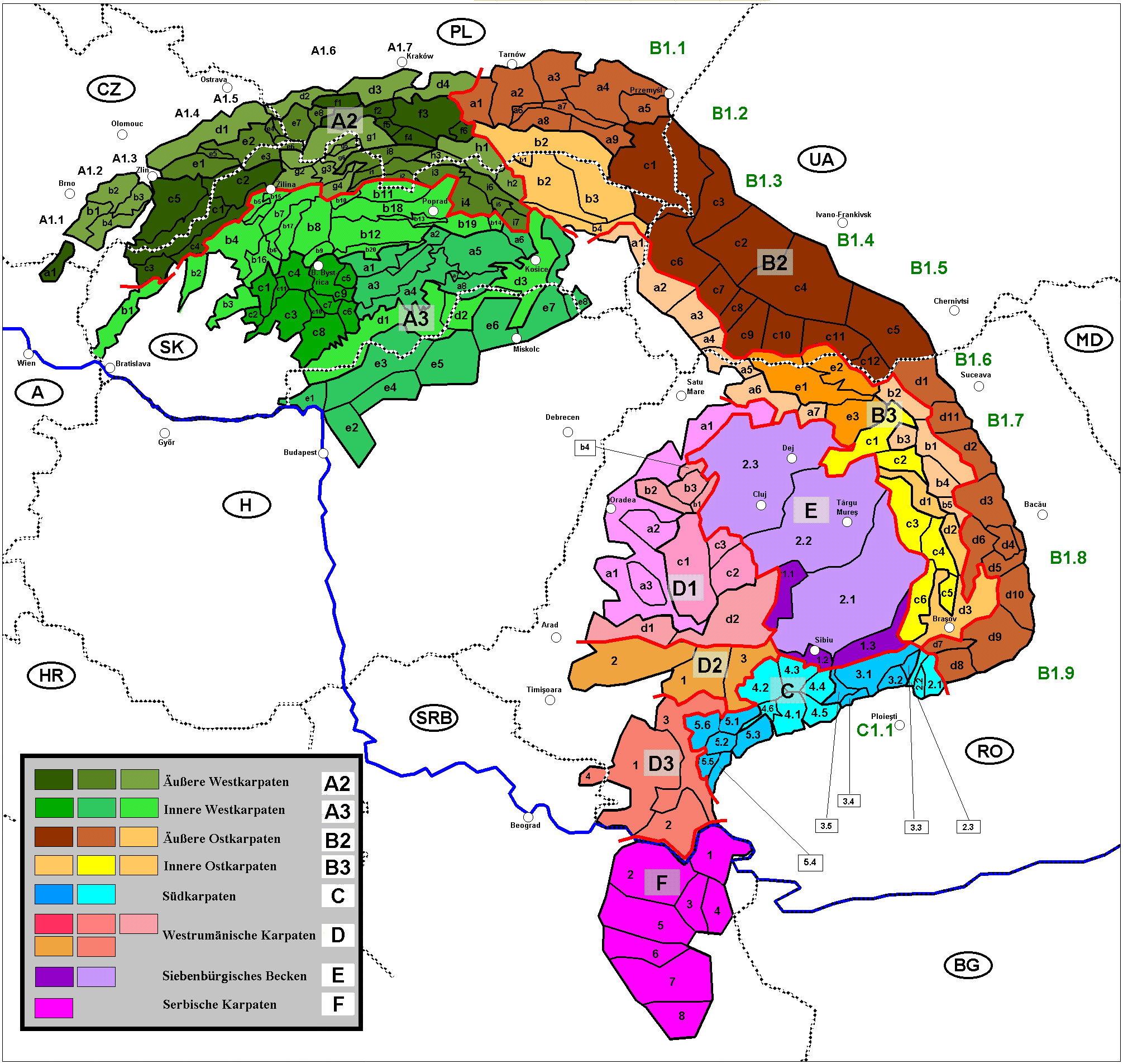
Wooded Carpathians: within Eastern Carpathians marked in B2 section with c1 to c12, and in B3 section with a1 to a7 and e1 to e3

The term Wooded Carpathians (Ukrainian: Лісисті Карпати, romanized: Lisysti Karpaty; Polish: Karpaty Lesiste; Hungarian: Erdős-Kárpátok; German: Waldkarpaten) refers to a group of mountain ranges that constitute the central section of Eastern Carpathians, covering both inner and outer regions of that section. Geographical scope of the term varies, since it is often used in broader or narrower sense, according to different classifications and terminological conventions. It is traditionally and most commonly applied to a wider group of mountain ranges that encompasses all mountains within central section of Outer Eastern Carpathians, including Eastern Beskids with Polonynian Beskids, and also all mountains within northern section of Inner Eastern Carpathians, including Vihorlat-Gutin Area and Maramureș-Rodna Area. In that sense, Wooded Carpathians are stretching from the southeastern corner of Poland and far eastern corner of Slovakia, through western parts of Ukraine, encompassing all of the Ukrainian Carpathians, and continuing into the northern region of Romania.

The term Wooded Carpathians should not be confused with partially overlapping terms like Ukrainian Carpathians, Eastern Beskids or Wooded Beskids, that are defined by different criteria.

== Subdivisions ==
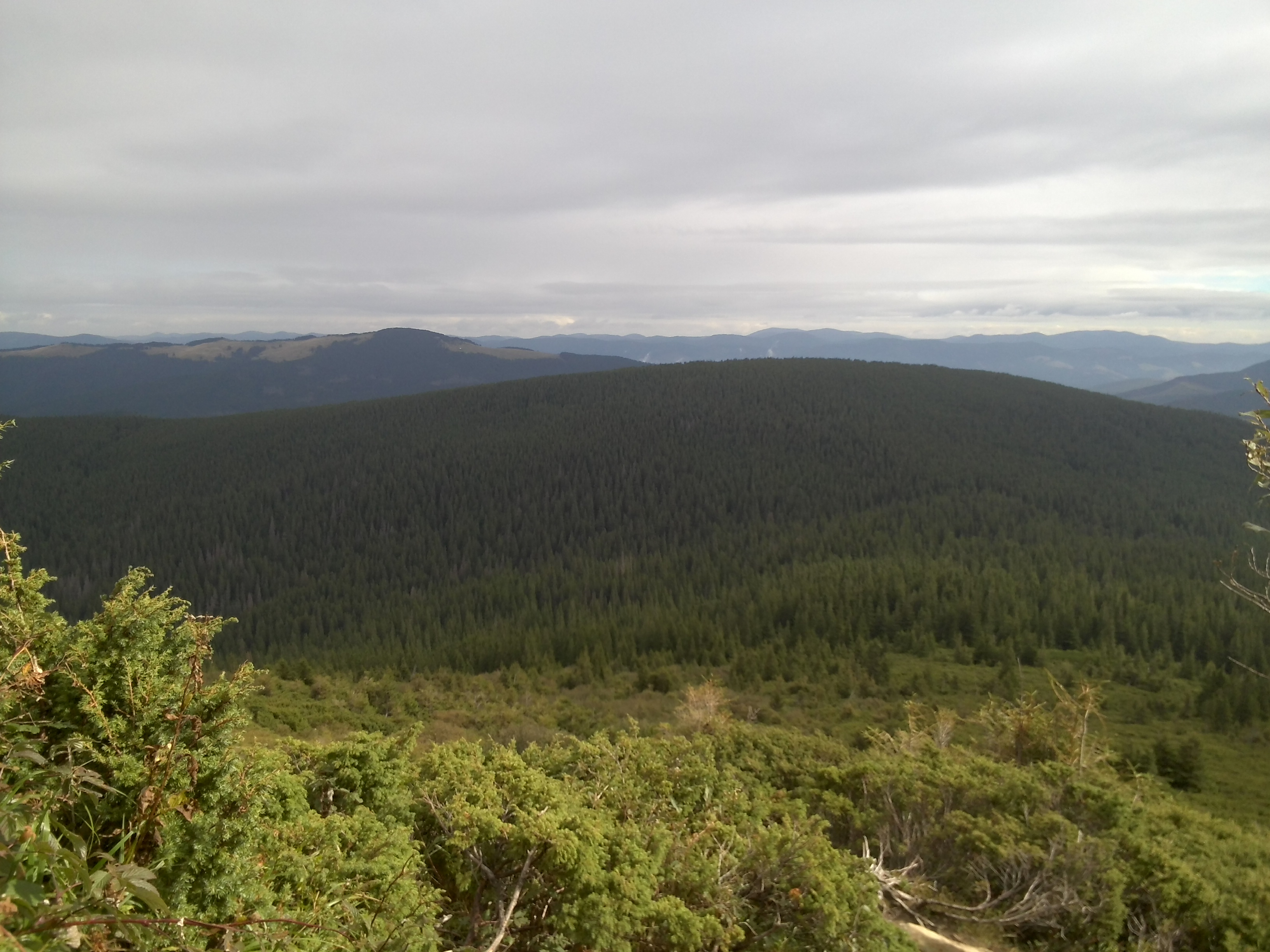
The woods of Hoverla, highest mountain of Wooded Carpathians in modern Ukraine

In wider sense, Wooded Carpathians include:

- central section of Outer Eastern Carpathians, including Eastern Beskids with Polonynian Beskids
- northern section of Inner Eastern Carpathians, including Vihorlat-Gutin Area and Maramureș-Rodna Area

== See also ==
- Divisions of the Carpathians
- Ukrainian Carpathians
- Romanian Carpathians
- Polonyna (montane meadow)

== Sources ==
- Földvary, Gábor Z. (1988). Geology of the Carpathian Region. Singapore: World Scientific Publishing Company. ISBN 9789813103825.
- Ilie Gherhes, "Romanian Human Habitat and Atypical Volohs' Living in the Wooded Carpathians (Ukraine)", Journal of Settlements and Spatial Planning, 4/2 (2013), pp. 341–345.
- Michael Schneeberger, Frank-Michael Lange, Die rumänischen Waldkarpaten: Maramureş, Vişeu de Sus und ein Abstecher in die Bukowina, Schelzky und Jeep 1998.
- Filip Świstuń, Galicyjskie Beskidy i Karpaty Lesiste: Zarys orograficzn, Rzeszow 1876.
- Tasenkevich, Lydia (2009). "Polonynas: Highlands Pastures in the Ukrainian Carpathians". Grasslands in Europe: Of High Nature Value. Zeist: KNNV Publishing. pp. 203–208. ISBN 9789004278103.
