= Polonyna (montane meadow) =

Montane meadows region in Ukraine

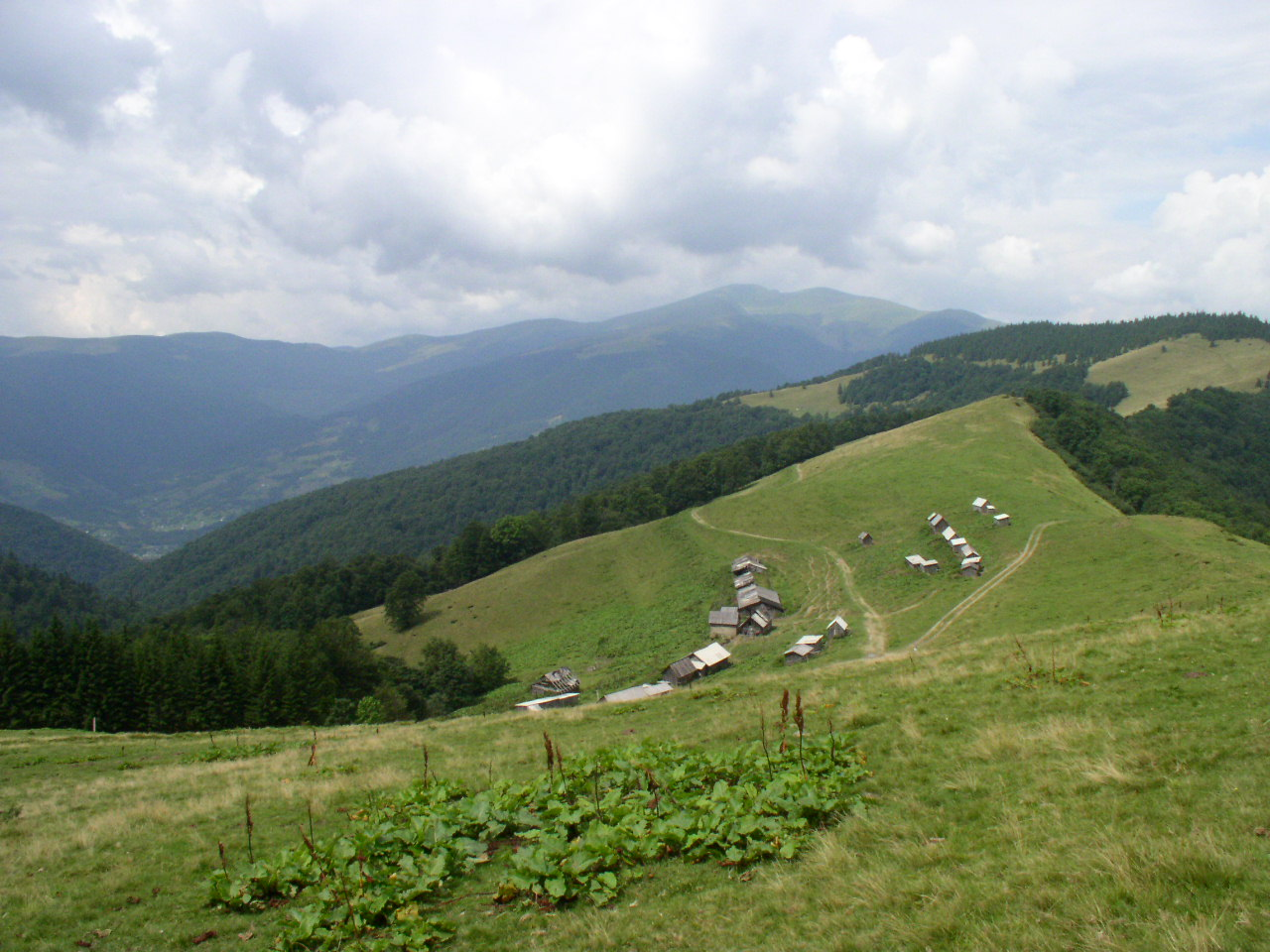
A montane meadow (polonyna) in the Ukrainian Carpathians

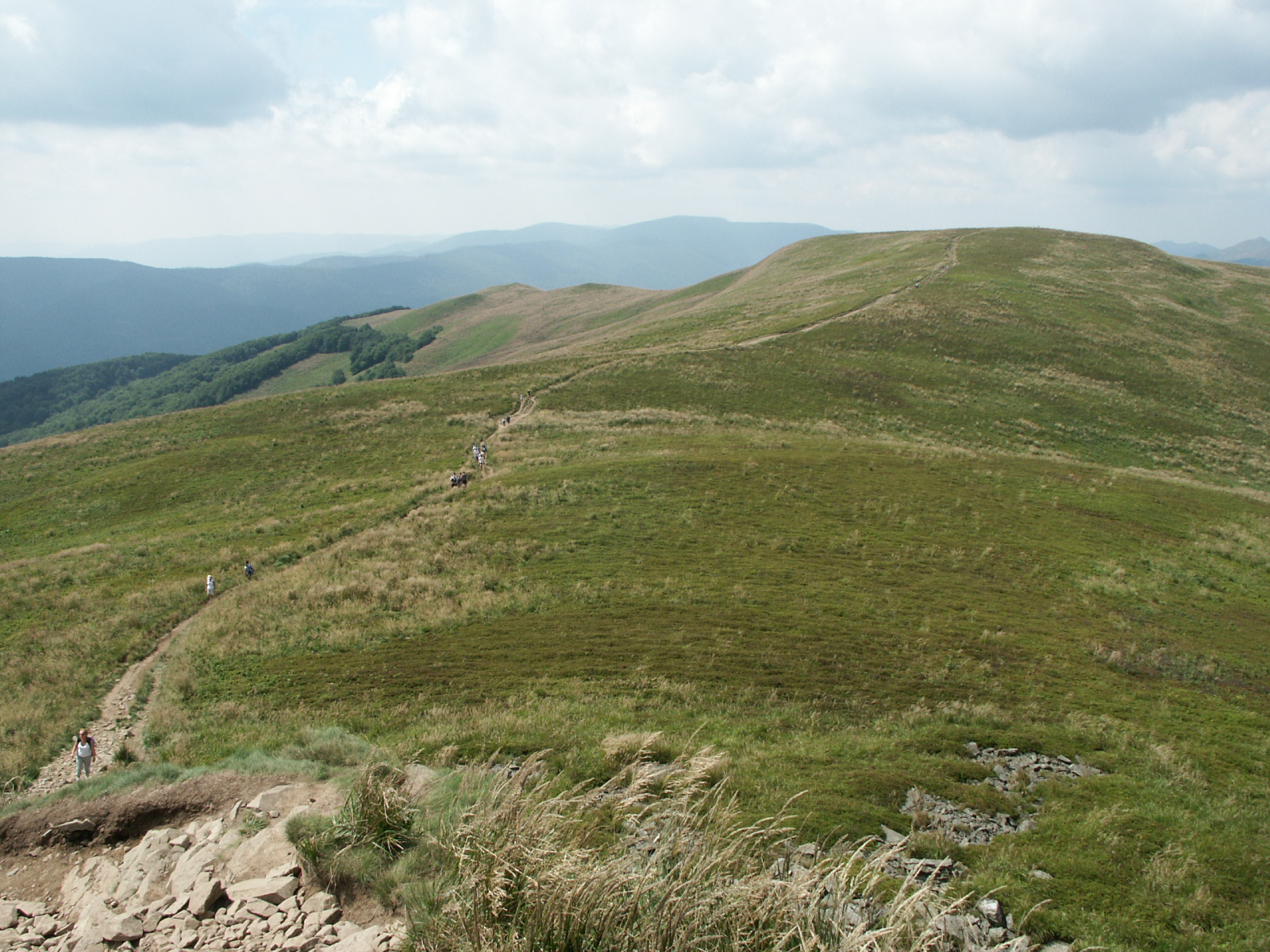
A montane meadow (polonyna) in Bieszczady Mountains, Poland

Polonyna (Ukrainian and Rusyn: полонина, romanized: polonyna; Polish: połonina; Slovak: polonina) is a specific, regionally-focused geographic term, that is used as a designation for areas of montane meadows (a landform type) in the upper subalpine or alpine zones of the Carpathian Mountains. The term polonyna was introduced to English from Slavic languages, in order to designate various mountainous regions, mainly in the Eastern Carpathians, and also in the Western Carpathians. The polonyna type areas of montane meadows are very frequent in the Outer Eastern Carpathians, particularly in the Eastern Beskids. Throughout history, they were used for pasture, and in modern times they have become a popular destination for various forms of recreational tourism.

The noun polonyna (plur. polonynas) and its corresponding adjectives (anglicized as polonyne or polonynian) are also used frequently in local toponyms throughout the Carpathian region. One of two main mountain ranges of the Eastern Beskids is known as the Polonyne Beskids or Polonynian Beskids (Ukrainian: Полонинські Бескиди; Polish: Beskidy Połonińskie), and it includes several mountains that also contain the same term in their names, like: Smooth Polonyna (Polish: Połonina Równa; Ukrainian: Полонина Рівна, romanized: Polonyna Rivna), Polonyna Borzhava (Polish: Połonina Borżawska; Ukrainian: Полонина Боржава), Red Polonyna (Polish: Połonina Czerwona; Ukrainian: Червонa Полонина, romanized: Chervona Polonyna), etc.

The term also appears as "planina" in several South Slavic languages, in which it functions as a synonym for "mountain." In Slovene, however, it shares the Carpathian meaning of montane (pasture) meadow, and is a very common toponym.

== See also ==
A montane meadow (polonyna) in Poloniny National Park, Slovakia

- Divisions of the Carpathians
- Ukrainian Carpathians
- Wooded Carpathians
- Polonynian Beskids

== Sources ==
- Földvary, Gábor Z. (1988). Geology of the Carpathian Region. Singapore: World Scientific Publishing Company. ISBN 9789813103825.
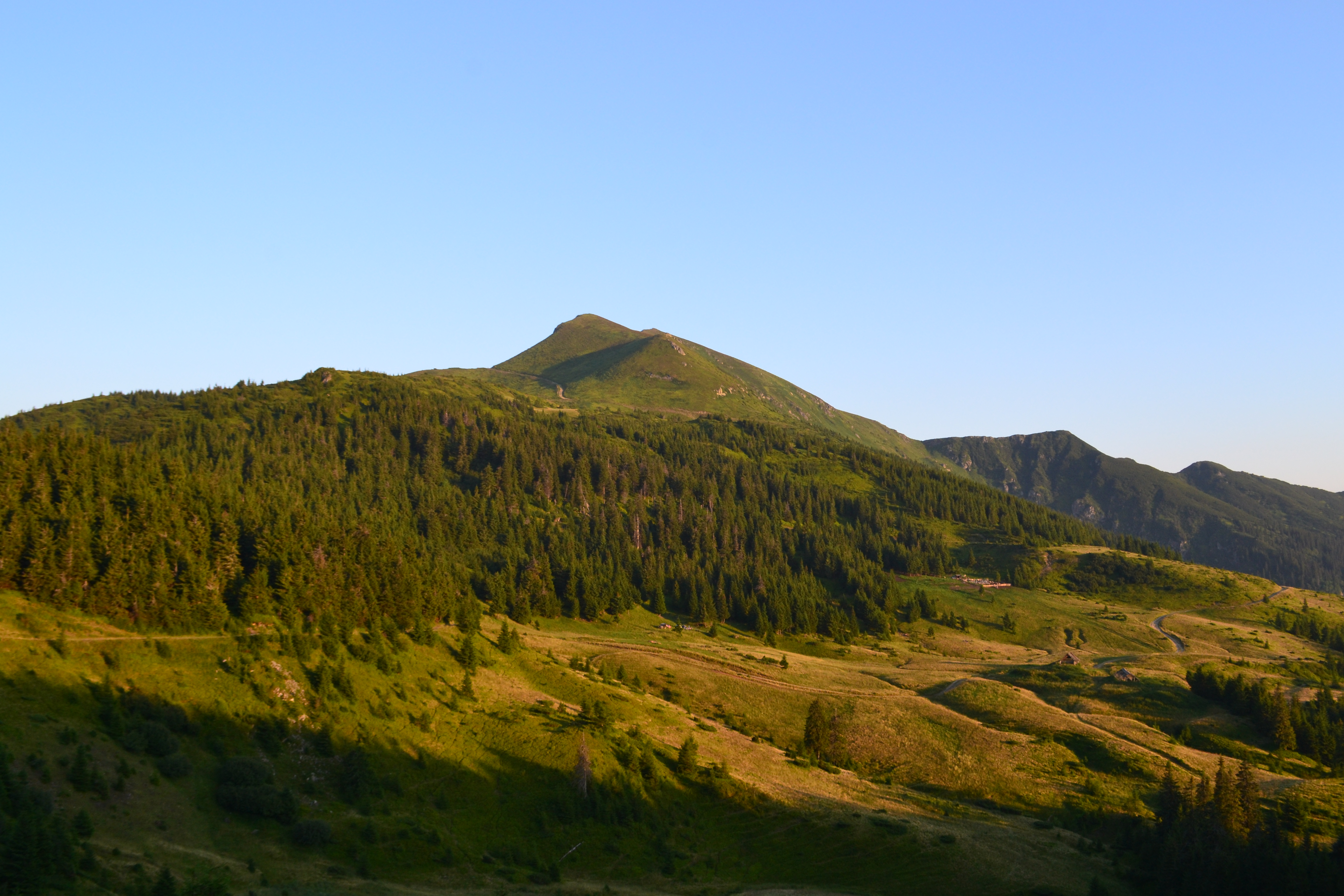
- Meadow Lysych on the Marmaros ridge (Ukraine)
  Tasenkevich, Lydia (2009). "Polonynas: Highlands Pastures in the Ukrainian Carpathians". Grasslands in Europe: Of High Nature Value. Zeist: KNNV Publishing. pp. 203–208. ISBN 9789004278103.
