= Main Carpathian Trail =

Former hiking trail in Poland

- Hoverla, the highest point of the trail
- Length: 830
- Location: Silesian Beskids, Poland
- Trailheads: Ustroń (in 1939 Komorní Lhotka); Stóg, Verkhovyna or Hnatasia (in 1939)
- Use: hiking

49.716667°N 18.816667°E

The Józef Piłsudski Main Carpathian Trail was a hiking trail, approximately 830 km long, (Note: The exact length of the trail has not been definitively indicated in the literature, and difficulties in determining it arise, among other things, from changes in its route and undefined exact endpoints. Midowicz (1988, p. 102), who actively participated in its marking, mentioned a trail of about 600 km, as did its originator Kazimierz Sosnowski (the latter, writing in 1938 about the prospect of extending the route in the newly annexed Zaolzie, mentioned a trail "nearly 700 km long"). However, this value – i.e., 600 km – is certainly a significant underestimate. The official length of the contemporary Main Beskid Trail, which largely replicates its route and ends near the Polish-Ukrainian border, is 519 km, while the straight-line distance from the Uzhok Pass (located just beyond the border) to Stóg is about 170 km. The Mountain Vademecum of the Central Mountain Tourism Center gives the length of the Main Carpathian Trail as "just under 750 km", although according to private studies, the trail might have been even about 840 km – assuming that on present-day Polish territory it was about 500 km, and on Ukrainian territory about 340 km (with the endpoint in Shybene). A similar result (825 km) is obtained from an attempt to reconstruct the main trail route on the Ustroń-Polana–Stóg section.) that connected the Silesian Beskids with the Czywczyn Mountains during the interwar period. Marked in red, this path was not only the longest continuous trail in Poland at the time but also in Europe, running along the entire stretch of the Polish Carpathians.

The western fragment of this trail remains today as the Main Beskid Trail, which partially overlaps with the original route and ends in Wołosate, near the Polish-Ukrainian border. The route of the Main Carpathian Trail on the border section running through the Low Beskids and Western Bieszczady is now followed by the Rzeszów–Grybów trail (known as the "Carpathian Trail") and the Slovak East Carpathian Magistrale. In the eastern part, segments of the former main trail coincide with the Ukrainian East Carpathian and Transcarpathian trails.

== History ==
=== Main Western Beskid Trail ===
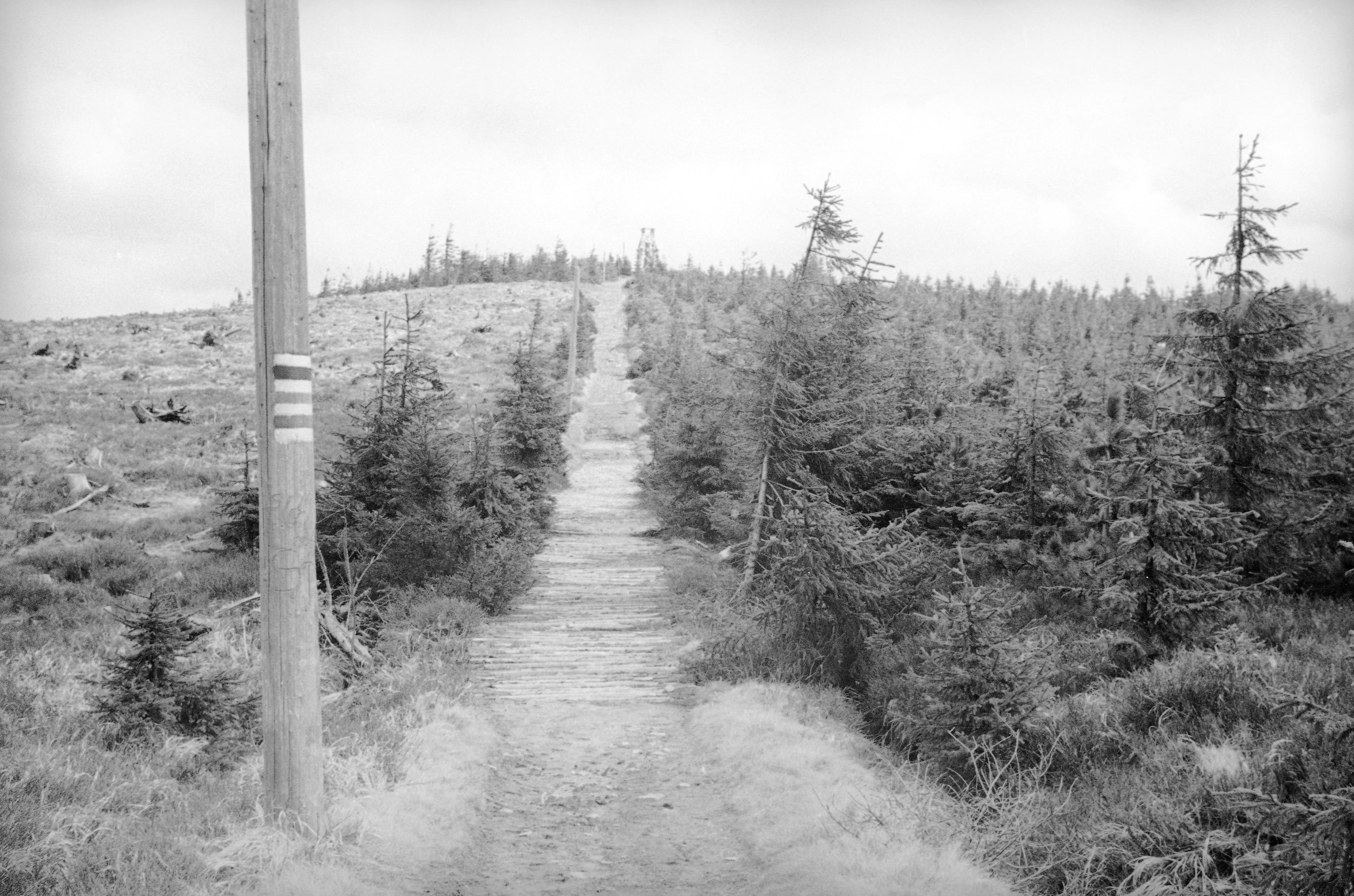
Part of the Main Carpathian Trail below the summit of Barania Góra in Silesian Beskids (1935)

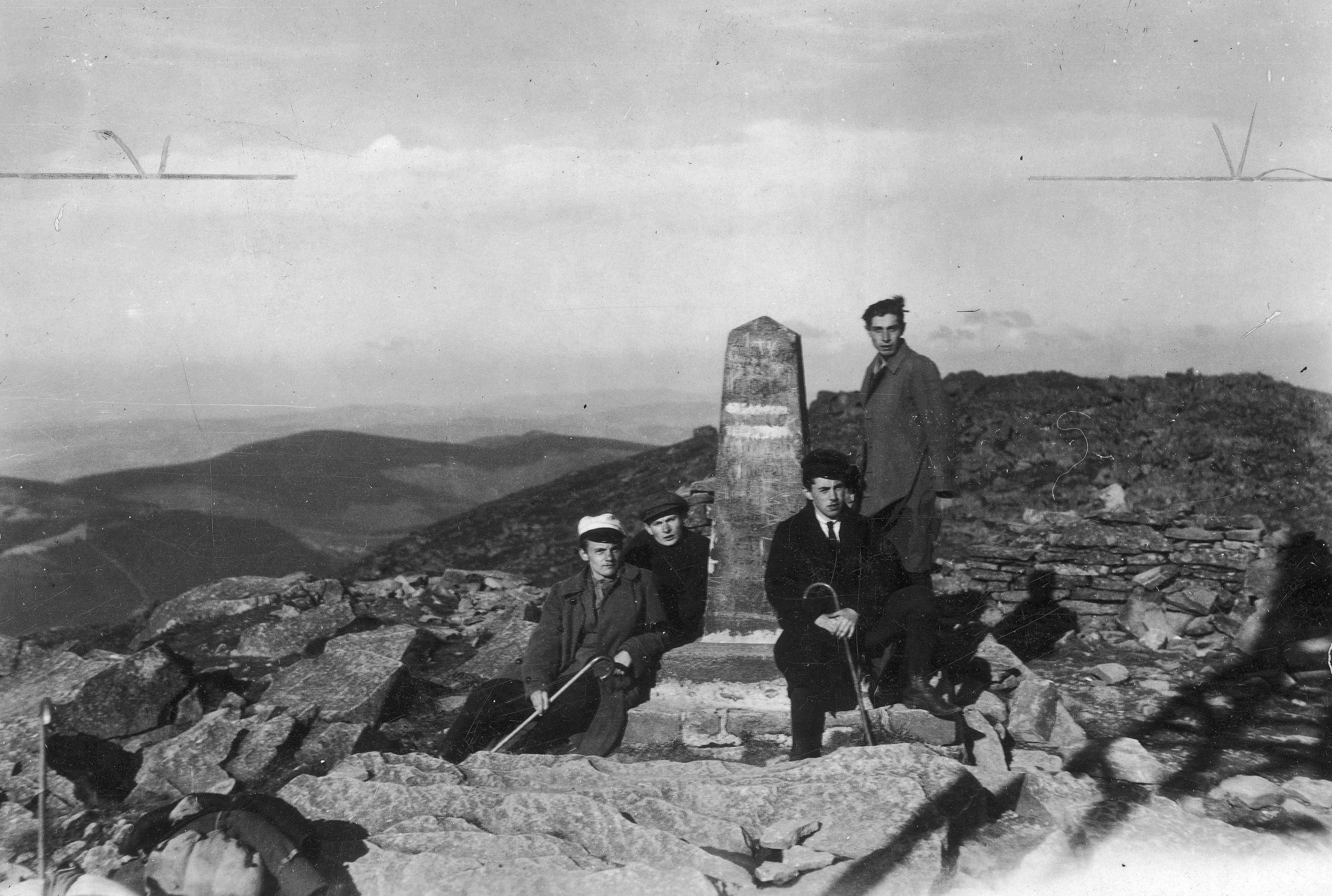
Tourists on top of Babia Góra in Żywiec Beskids (1925)

The idea of connecting the summit trails of various Western Beskid ranges into a single main trail was first presented in the summer of 1923 in an article by Kazimierz Sosnowski, published in Przegląd Sportowy. This idea was soon presented to the Polish Tatra Society, which, through the decisions of the Commission for Mountain Works and the Main Board, set out to implement it. The main aim was to popularize Polish hiking tourism by creating a main trail (supplemented by side and connecting trails) and a network of mountain huts spaced about a day's walk apart. At the same time, it aimed to limit the influence of the active German Beskidenverein organization in the Silesian and Żywiec Beskids.

According to Sosnowski's original idea, the main Western Beskid trail was about 200 km long and stretched from Ustroń in the Silesian Beskids in the west to Krynica in the Beskid Sądecki in the east. The marking and signing of the trail were entrusted to various Polish Tatra Society branches, which meant the work proceeded at an uneven pace and by filling in successive gaps in the route. Numerous minor corrections were made to the trail, often due to the destruction of the path or signs, and sometimes due to deliberate removal.

Work initiated in 1924 progressed rapidly, although initially, there were almost no white-and-red-white markings along the planned trail route (earlier trails were mainly marked with one or two colored stripes). Exceptions were the sections from Czantoria to Stożek (in the Silesian Beskids), from Żabnica through Pilsko to the Glinne Pass (in the Żywiec Beskids), and from Przehyba to Rytro (in the Beskid Sądecki). As part of coordinated Polish Tatra Society actions, sections in the Sądecki and Żywiecki Beskids were marked first.

By 1927, after completing the segment from Rabka to Krynica, the Polish Tatra Society reported the completion of the entire Main Western Beskid trail. However, this announcement was premature as significant additions to the trail were still made in 1928 – between Stożek and Barania Góra in the Silesian Beskids and between Hala Długa and Lubań in the Gorce Mountains. Despite completing these works, between 10 and 12 km of trail still needed marking, which was filled in near Czantoria the following year. Even then, the trail had a gap of over 20 km in the middle, as the western segment ended in Osielec village after leaving the Babia Góra Range, while the eastern segment started only in Rabka. Initially, connecting these segments was not planned, and Sosnowski recommended traveling this section by train. In 1929, the Polish Tatra Society branch in Rabka marked a connecting trail between Rabka and the ridge of Polica above the village of Bystra. Summarizing the work in 1930, the Polish Tatra Society indicated that the creation of the trail can be considered complete in its general outline. The formal unification of the two longer segments took place in 1930 when the main trail was rerouted onto the newly marked connector, bypassing Osielec.

According to Sosnowski's recommendations in the Guide to the Western Beskids from 1926, traversing the route from Ustroń to Krynica should take from 9 to 12 days. However, the author included in this time the opportunity to explore the Babia Góra area, traverse the optional Pieniny trail, and omitted some sections of the main trail.

=== Main Eastern Beskid Trail ===
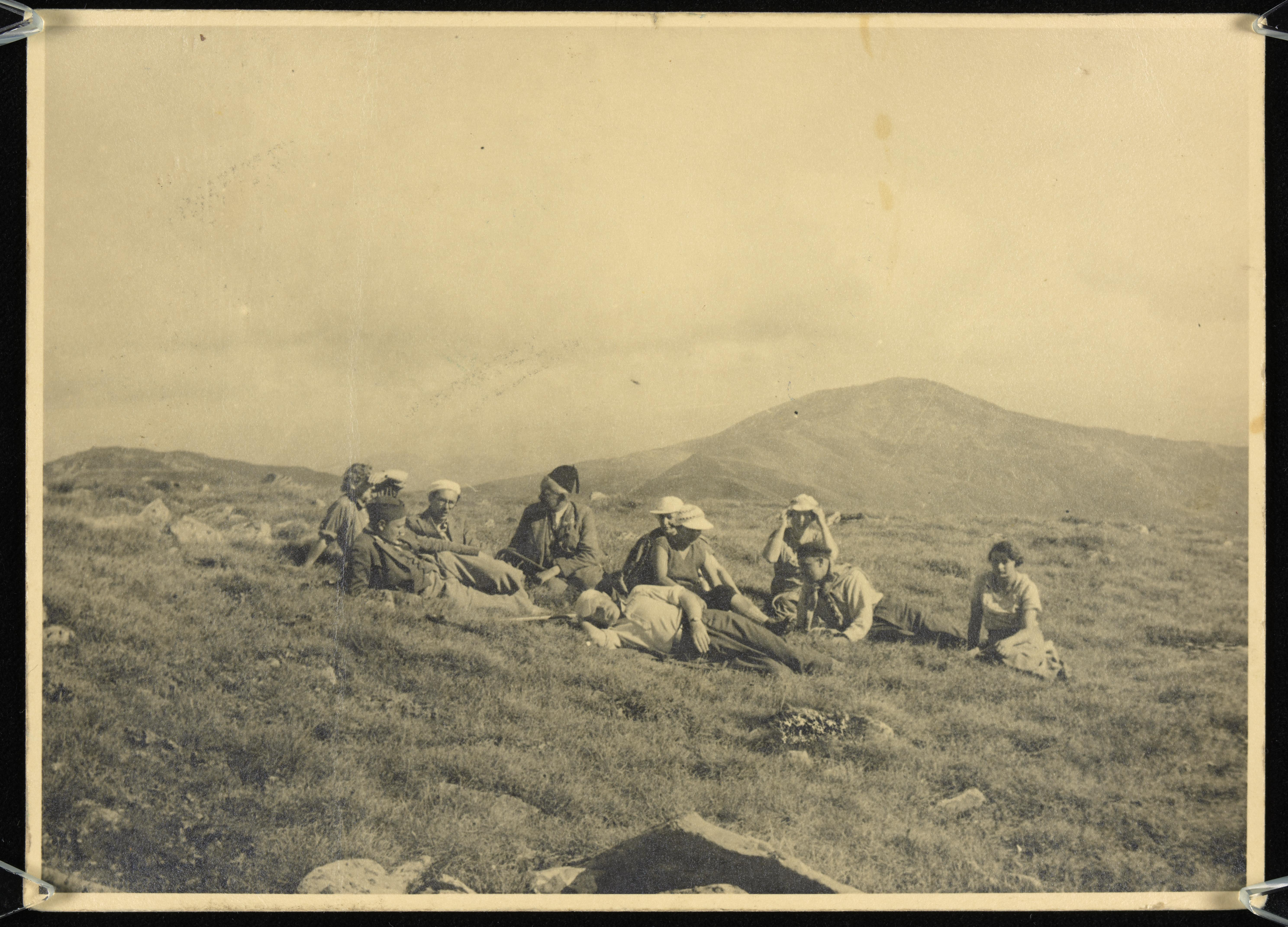
Mieczysław Orłowicz with a tourist group on Menchul in Chornohora (1935)

As the trail marking work in the Western Beskids neared completion, Mieczysław Orłowicz, a promoter of tourism in the Eastern Beskids, proposed the idea of establishing a similar trail in the eastern part. His plan, presented to the Inter-District Eastern Carpathian Commission of the Polish Tatra Society in 1926 or 1927, quickly gained approval. In 1928, it was endorsed by the Society's Delegates' Congress. Over the next few years, the exact route of the trail was determined. In May 1930, the Eastern Beskid Commission of the Polish Tatra Society divided the territory among the various units of the organization and established the precise trail route east of Sianky, assigning the task of marking its sections to the appropriate branches and clubs.

Trail planning and marking began in 1931 and continued until 1934. Henryk Gąsiorowski, in his 1933 Guide to the Eastern Beskids, indicated that traversing the Sianky–Stóg section would take from 17 to 18 days, although his proposed itinerary included 3 days of rest and occasionally diverged from the main trail, omitting some sections.

Similar to the Western section, the work on the main trail in the Eastern Beskids extended beyond mere tourism. The active efforts of the Polish Tatra Society also served ideological purposes, even if these were not explicitly stated by the organization's units. By organizing Polish tourism in the Eastern Beskids, there was an effort to firmly integrate these areas with the Republic of Poland and counteract local Ukrainian movements.

=== Further work ===
Historically, the Central Beskids region – comprising the Low Beskids and Western Bieszczady – garnered the least interest among the tourist community. These ranges were perceived as the least attractive and thus were poorly developed for tourism. The decision to extend the main trail eastward from Krynica was only made after the primary efforts in the west were completed, in May 1932.

Work on the central section began either in the same year or early the next (with a short section from Krynica to Wysowa). However, due to the organizational weaknesses of the newly established Polish Tatra Society branches in Jasło, Krosno, and Sanok, progress was slow. Only when the task was assigned to the branches in Gorlice and Lviv was it possible to connect the two main sections of the trail. An additional challenge was the catastrophic flood in July 1934.

In 1933, the Gorlice Branch of the Polish Tatra Society extended the trail from Wysowa to the vicinity of Dukla. Further east, the establishment of the main trail in the Central Beskids was more of an attempt to create a transit route, the shortest connection between the Beskid Sądecki and the Eastern Bieszczady. The decision was made to route the trail almost entirely along the state-maintained border road. (Note: Before 1935, a red trail was marked from the hermitage of John of Dukla near Nowa Wieś, through Cergowa to Iwonicz-Zdrój, intended as an extension of the main trail. Nevertheless, as early as 1934, there were plans to establish a trail leading eastward along a different route, following the border path. This plan was realized a year later. After connecting the two sections of the main trail near Dukla, it likely ran along the road towards the Dukla Pass (in 1935, there were reports of the trail being extended westward to this pass). At the same time, a variant trail was planned in the vicinity of Iwonicz-Zdrój.)

Following the death of Józef Piłsudski, the Polish Tatra Society passed a resolution on 23 June 1935, naming the trail connecting the easternmost and westernmost mountain ranges in the country after the late Chief of State (the resolution referred to the trail as the Main Carpathian Trail of the Polish Tatra Society named after Józef Piłsudski). This symbolic unification of the Polish mountains emphasized the Polish state's dominion over this section of the Carpathians. However, the trail was not yet completed at this time, particularly the segment intended to run through the Low Beskids east of the Dukla Pass. The section from the Dukla Pass to the Łupków Pass was marked in September 1935, and the entire 75-kilometer segment to the peak of Halicz was marked by the Lviv Branch of the Polish Tatra Society before 31 March 1936, likely before the end of 1935.

After the border changes in 1945, when the entire Eastern Carpathian section was lost to the Soviet Union, and due to the trail's destruction during World War II, its route through the Low Beskids and Western Bieszczady had to be reestablished. The trail, later officially named the Main Beskid Trail, was re-marked between 1952 and 1953. However, its route differed from that of the 1930s because, on the depopulated terrain of the Low Beskids and Bieszczady (due to the resettlement of Ukrainian and Rusyn populations during Operation Vistula), the trail was shifted away from the border line for political reasons.

== Route ==
=== Western section ===
After the completion of trail marking, the main trail began in the Silesian Beskids at the Ustroń Polana railway station, from where it ascended to Czantoria. It then followed the ridge towards the south to Stożek (with the Stożek mountain hut) and further to Kyrkawica. On this last peak, it changed direction to the east. It continued through Kiczory towards Barania Góra, passing the Przysłop mountain hut along the way. Next, it descended into the Soła valley, reaching Węgierska Górka.

After crossing the river, it began its route in the Żywiec Beskids. It led through Hala Rysianka to Trzy Kopce, where it reached the state border. It then climbed to Pilsko (Góra Pięciu Kopców; Hala Miziowa mountain hut), leaving the summit on the Czechoslovak side, and then descended to the Glinne Pass with a variant path towards the Korbielów mountain hut. It then continuously followed the border through the Korbielów Beskids and Jaworzyna. From the Głuchaczki Pass, the trail descended into the Polhoranka river valley and, crossing through Czechoslovakia, emerged at the Jałowiecka Północna Pass, thus bypassing Mędralowa. (Note: In 1925, the Western Beskids trail was routed through Mędralowa, but already in 1927 its route was shifted to a shortcut bypassing the summit. After the border changes in 1938, the area through which the trail ran was incorporated into Poland.) From there, it led to the Markowe Szczawiny mountain hut, then to the Brona Pass and the main summit of Babia Góra – the highest peak of the Western Beskids. (Note: Originally, the trail ran through Mała Babia Góra, bypassing the mountain hut. It was only in 1927 that it was moved to a path running through Czarna Hala to Markowe Szczawiny mountain hut.) From there, through the ridge of Polica, the trail descended about 1,200 m to the Rabka Basin (villages Bystra, Jordanów, Rabka). In Rabka, the trail entered the Gorce Mountains. It climbed to the highest peak in the range, Turbacz, via Stare Wierchy mountain hut. It led through the southwestern ridge of Lubań Range – through Kiczora, Runek, Lubań, and Średni Groń – then descended to Krościenko.

Upon entering the Beskid Sądecki, the trail led to Przehyba and the highest peak of the range, Radziejowa. It crossed the Poprad valley in Rytro and climbed over 750 m again, passing Hala Pisana, Wierch nad Kamieniem, and Hala Łabowska, to reach Runek and Jaworzyna Krynicka. From there, it descended to Krynica (Krynica-Wieś).

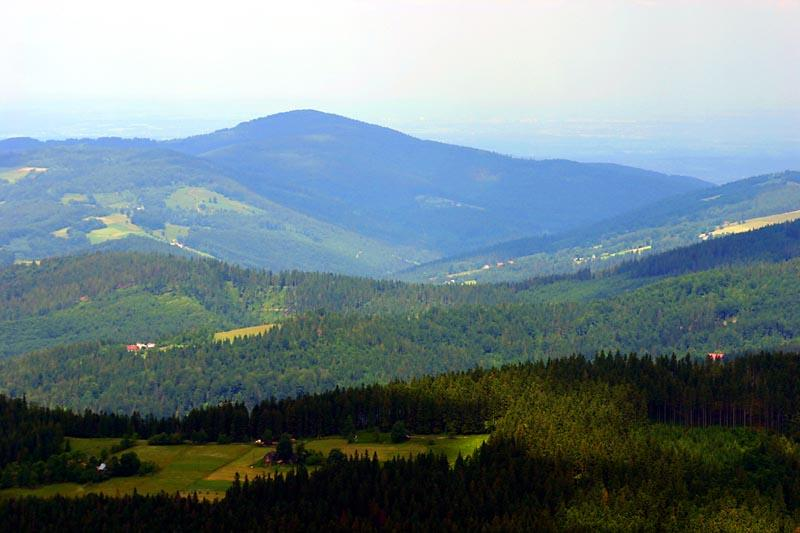
Barania Góra

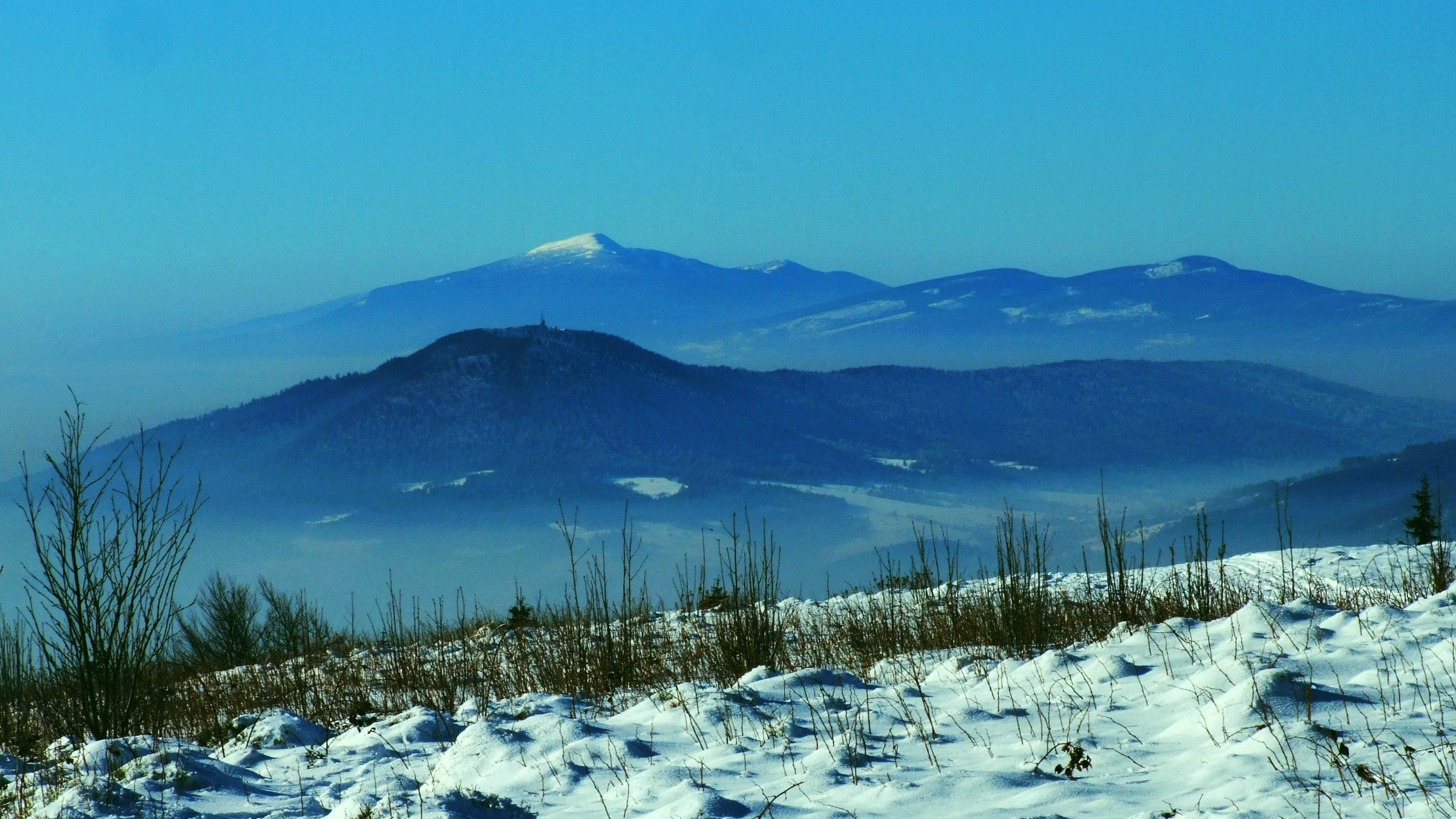
Babia Góra

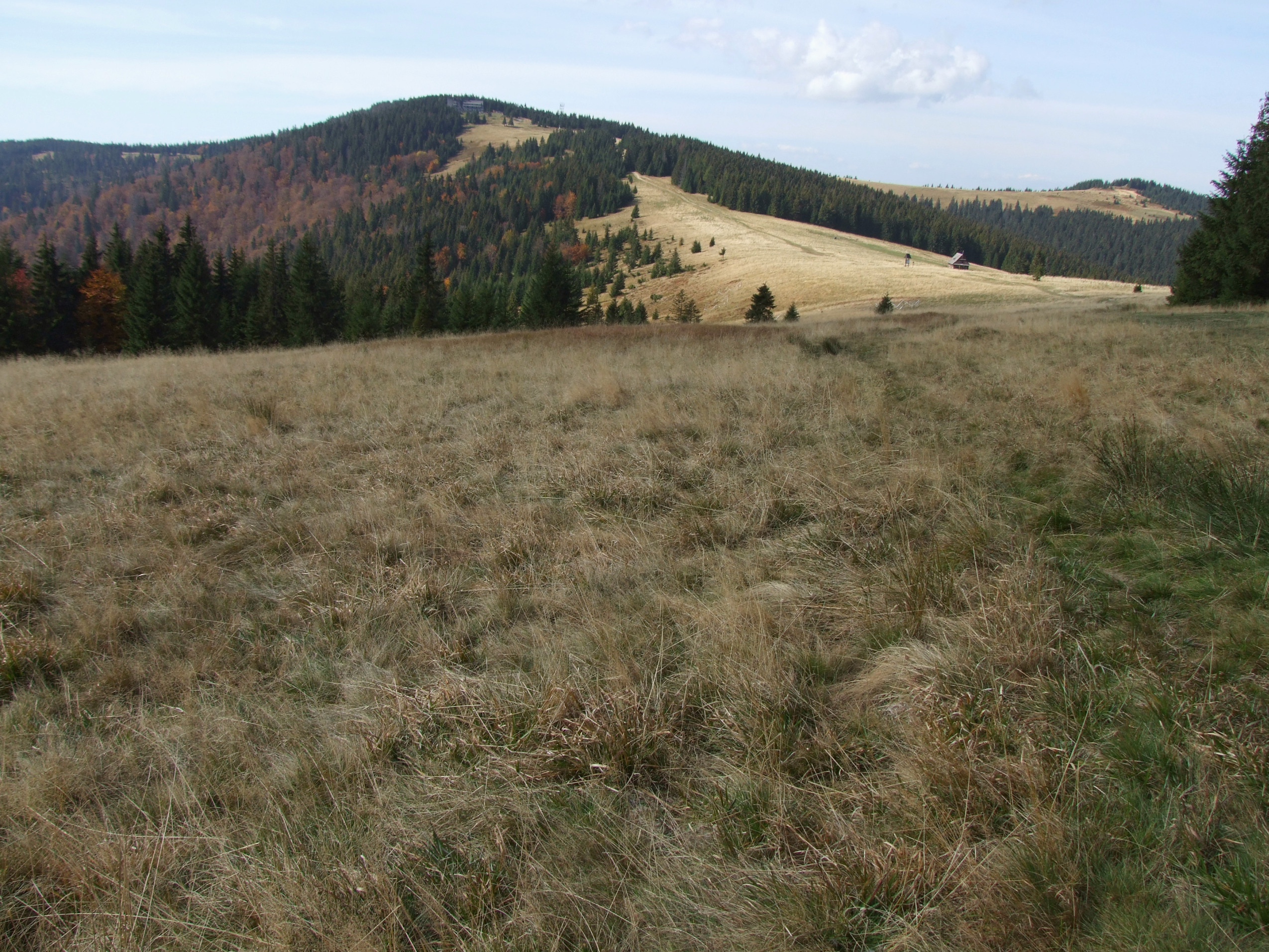
Turbacz

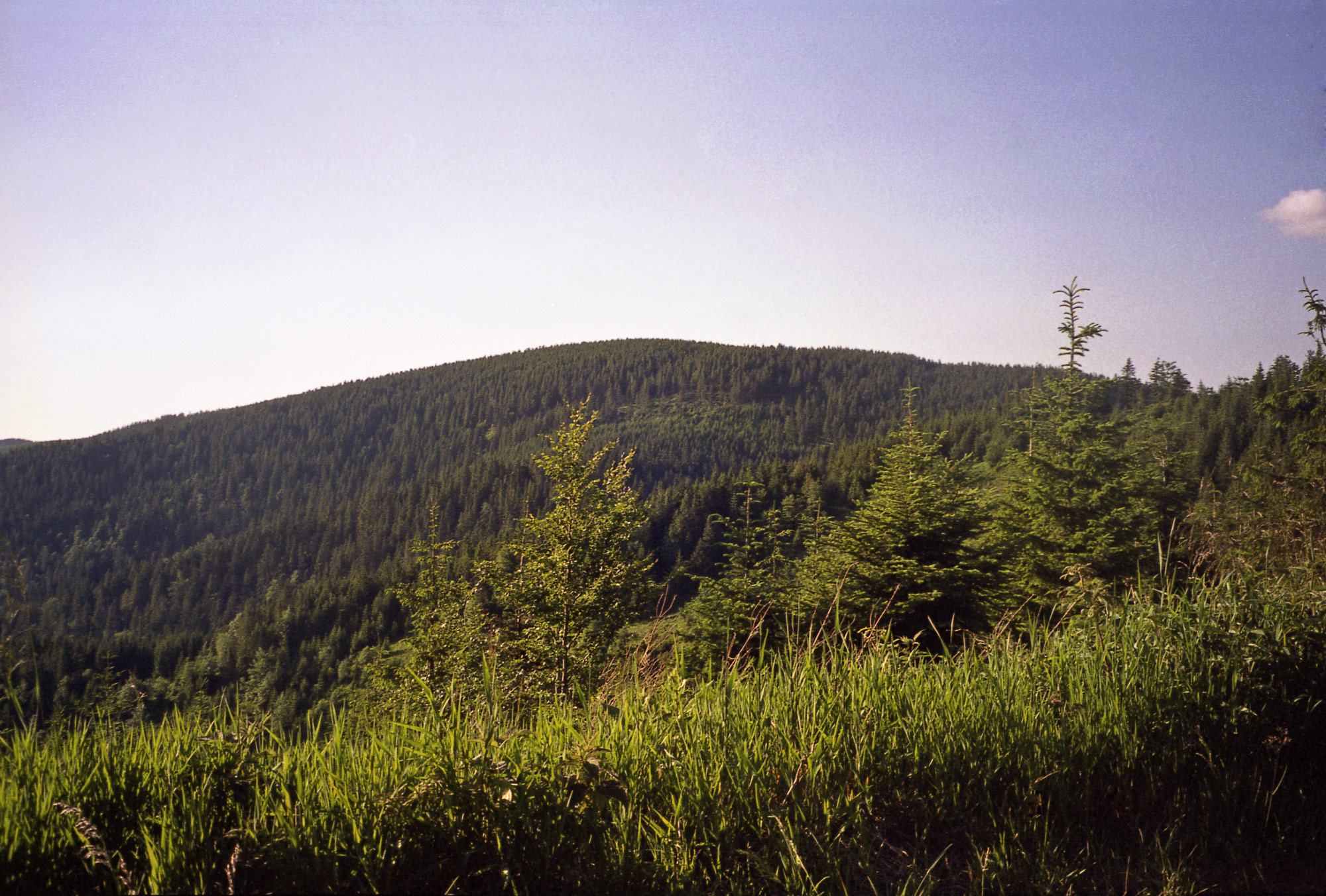
Radziejowa

=== Middle section ===
In Krynica, the main trail entered the Low Beskids. This section also served as a connecting segment between the two main parts: the Western and Eastern Beskids. From the health resort, the trail headed towards the state border, where it ascended the highest peak in the Polish part of this range, Lackowa. In the village of Wysowa, it turned northeast, reaching the ridge of Magura Wątkowska, bypassing its highest elevation, then passing through the peak of Polana and the village of Chyrowa. South of Dukla, the trail reached the road leading through the villages of Tylawa and Barwinek to the Dukla Pass. From there, the trail ran along the Polish-Czechoslovak border, with a slight deviation near the village of Czeremcha. It continued through Kamień nad Jaśliskami (bypassing the summit from the south), Wielki Bukowiec, Danawa, Garb Średni, Radoszycka Pass, and finally to Łupków Pass.

After crossing the pass, the trail began its journey through the Western Bieszczady. It proceeded through Wysoki Groń, Rydoszowa, descended near Solinka, and then traversed through Czerenin, Stryb, and Rypi Wierch, from where it descended to the Roztoki Górne Pass. Continuing along the border watershed ridge, it passed through Okrąglik, Płasza, Dziurkowiec, Riaba Skała, Czoło, Hrubki, and Krzemieniec, reaching Wielka Rawka. Here, it turned northwest, leaving the Polish-Czechoslovak border. The trail crossed the Dział ridge with the culmination at Mała Rawka, and after passing the village of Wetlina, ascended Hnatowe Berdo and Roh in the Połonina Wetlińska range. It then descended to Berehy Górne and ascended again to Połonina Caryńska, culminating at Kruhly Wierch. From Ustrzyki Górne, the trail led to the highest peak of the Western Bieszczady, Tarnica, and then Halicz and Rozsypaniec, where it returned to the state border. Finally, it passed through Kińczyk Bukowski, Stinśka, Opołonek, and Piniaszkowy, reaching Uzhok Pass near Sianky.

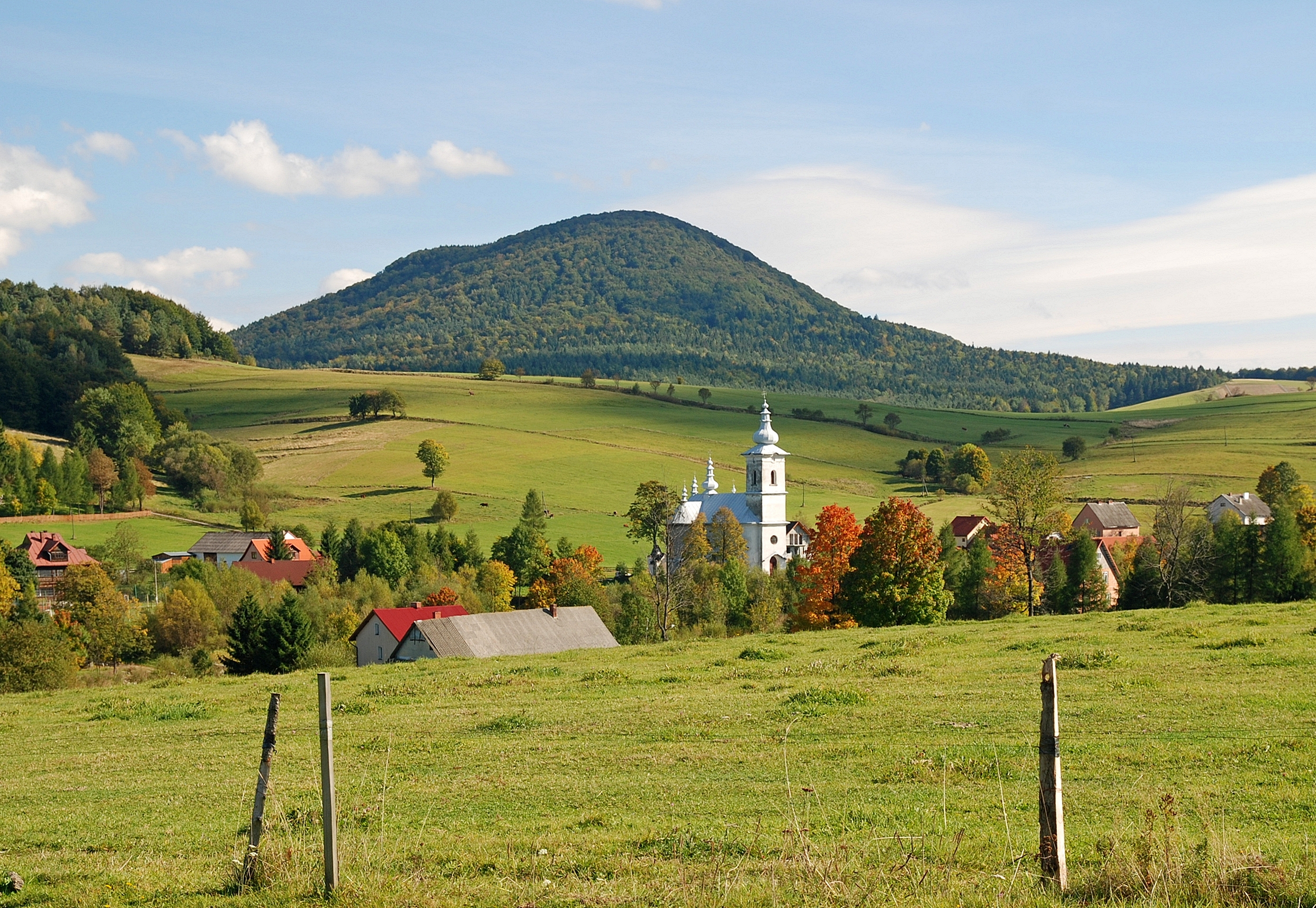
Lackowa

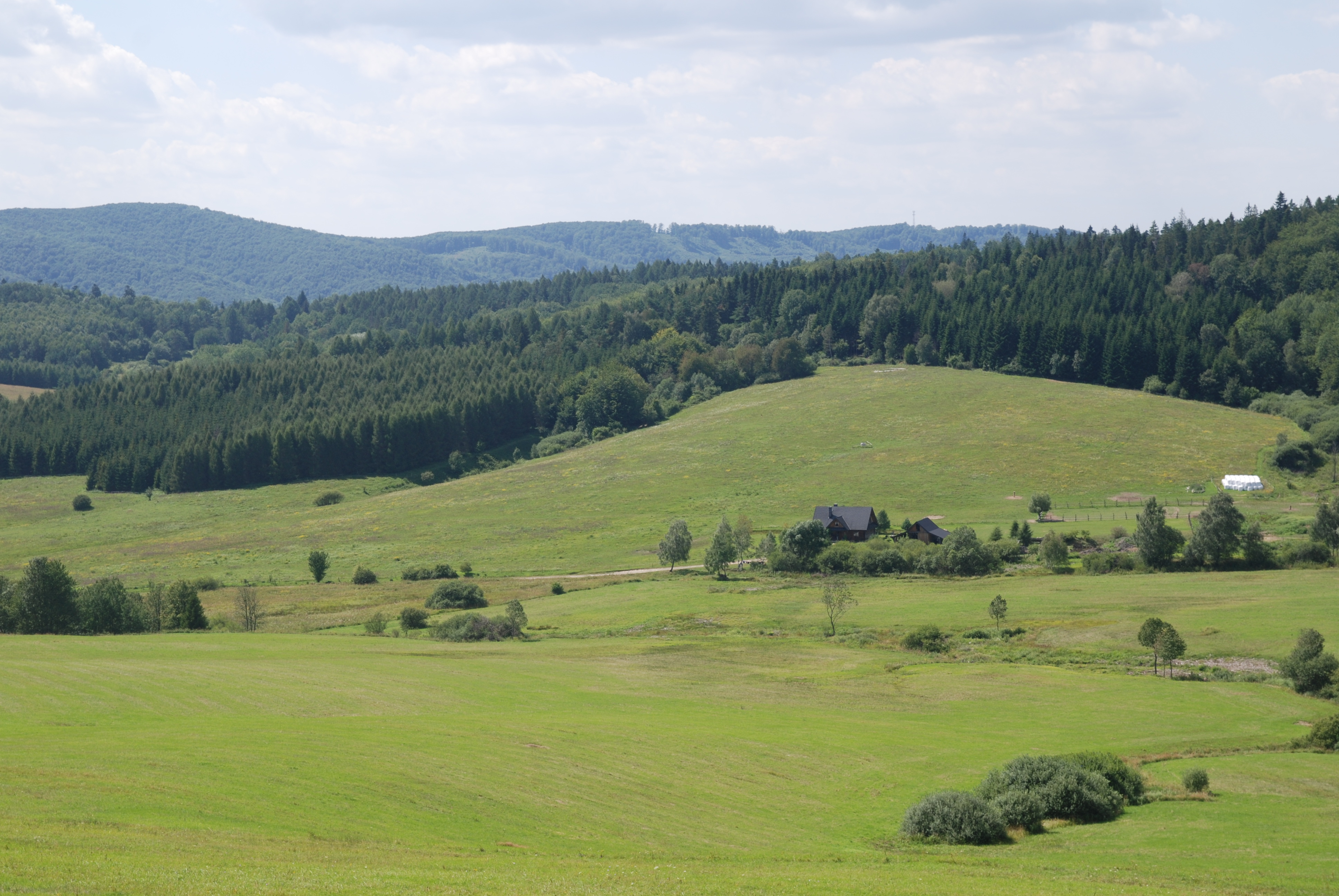
Łupków Pass

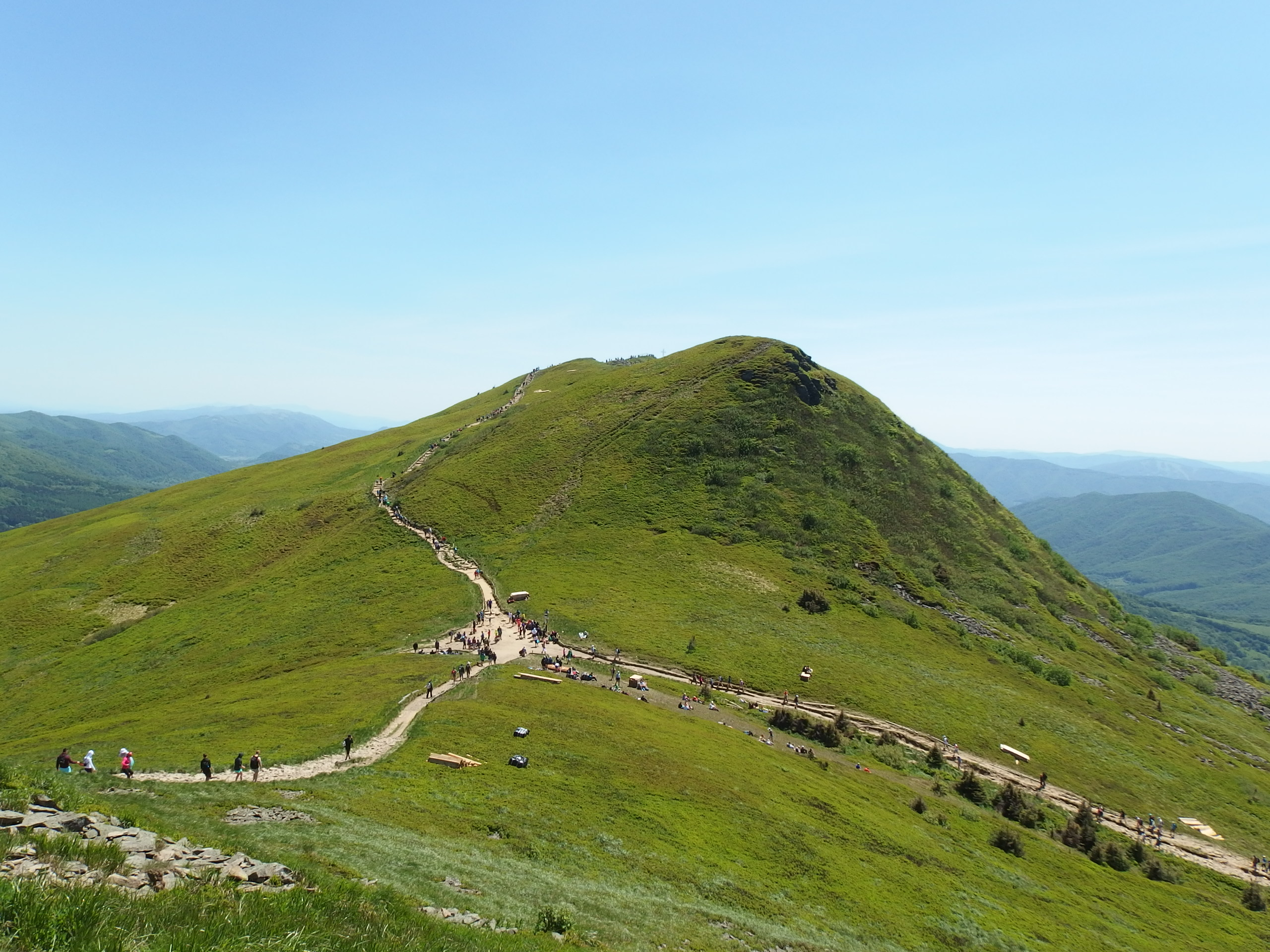
Tarnica

=== Eastern section ===
In Sianky, near the railway station, began the section of the trail originally called the Eastern Beskid Trail. (Note: After the middle and eastern sections were connected in the Uzhok Pass area, a connector trail marked in red branched off to Sianky.) This section led through the Beskid Wielki to the village of Karpatske, then onward to Starostyna, Chresty, Ruski Put, Wielki Wierch, Ostry Wierch, and Zelemenius, reaching the highest peak of the Eastern Bieszczady – Pikui. From Pikui, the trail followed the border ridge, initially heading northeast and east (passing through Wielki Menczył), then turning south and southeast, bypassing Veretskyi Pass. Near the village of Verkhniachka, it turned east again, leading through Beskid Wierch to Jawornik Wielki. There, it left the state border, turning north and then northeast towards the village of Lavochne. (Note: Originally, it was planned that the trail from Pikui would lead to the village of Husne Vyzhne, from where it would follow the road through Matkiv, Smozhe, Tukholka, and Plavie to reach Trostian. However, initially, the trail was marked from Pikui to Klymets near the Veretskyi Pass, and from there to Tukholka and further towards Trostian. In 1933, a route connecting Pikui with Jawornik Wielki was marked, and subsequently, the white-red-white markings of the main trail were transferred to this route.) The trail then ascended Trostian, where there was the Trostian mountain hut, and from there it descended to Slavske via Przysłup. The red-marked trail then led to Wysoki Wierch and Czarna Repa, continuing along the state border to Toruńska Pass, which separates the Bieszczady from the Gorgany mountains.

From Toruńska Pass (then called Wyszkowska), the trail led through Załom to Gorgan Wyszkowski and Jaworowa Kiczera, then descended to the Świca river valley (with a mountain hut). It continued under Jajko Ilemskie, through Sywania Lolińska, to Mołoda, and bypassing the peak of Jajko Perehińskie, it descended to the Mołoda stream valley. From there, the Main Eastern Beskid Trail ascended the slope of Koń Grofecki to Grofa, and then through Płyśce, Parenki, and Mała Popadia to Popadia. From Wielka Popadia, the marked trail led through the Petros stream valley to the Jali mountain hut. It continued through Wysoka and Ihrowiec to the highest peak of the range – Wielka Sywula. Then, descending through Ruszczyna, the trail traversed Negrowa and Bojaryn, leading along the Sałatruczel and Sałatruk streams to Bystrica. After passing the village, the white-red-white trail followed the Doużyniec stream valley through Pikun to Doboszanka and the nearby mountain hut. From there, it ascended Babiny Pohar, through Mały Gorgan, Syniak, and Chomiak to the Prutec Yablunytsia valley. The trail then led along the road to Yablunytsia, where it entered the Chornohora range.

From there, through the Mikulinki ridge, the trail led to Vorokhta, then through Kiczera to Kukul. Next, it passed through Foreszczenka to the Zaroślak mountain hut. From there, the trail ascended back to the main watershed ridge – to Hoverla (the highest peak of the Polish Eastern Carpathians and the entire trail) – and continued through Breskul, Pożyżewska, Dancerz, Turkul, Rebra, Menchul, and Dzembronia to the last peak in the range, Pip Ivan. According to the plans adopted in 1930, the trail was to follow the state border through Waskul and Wychid to Stóg, where the endpoint of the trail from Sianky was designated at the tripoint of the Polish, Czechoslovak, and Romanian borders.

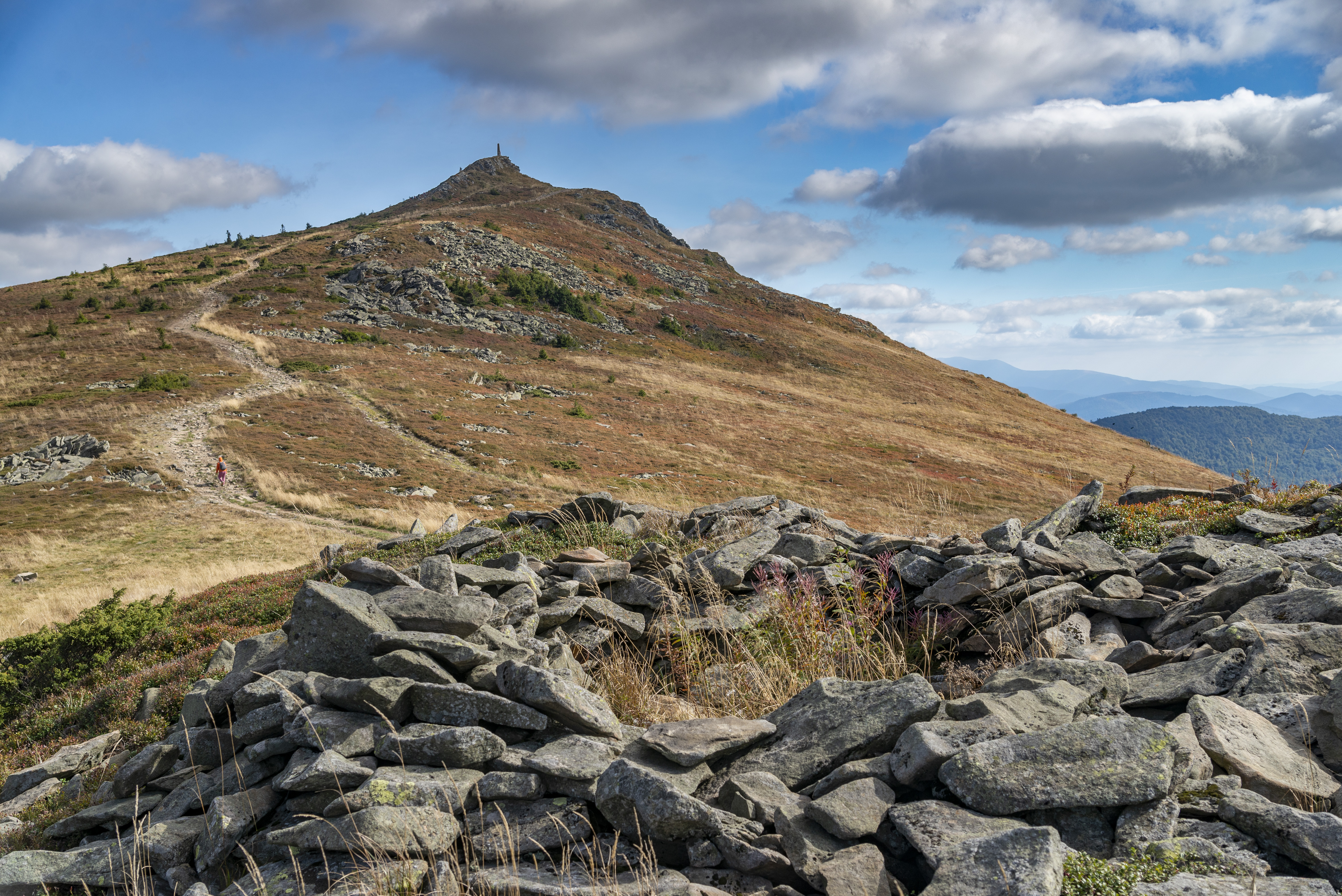
Pikui

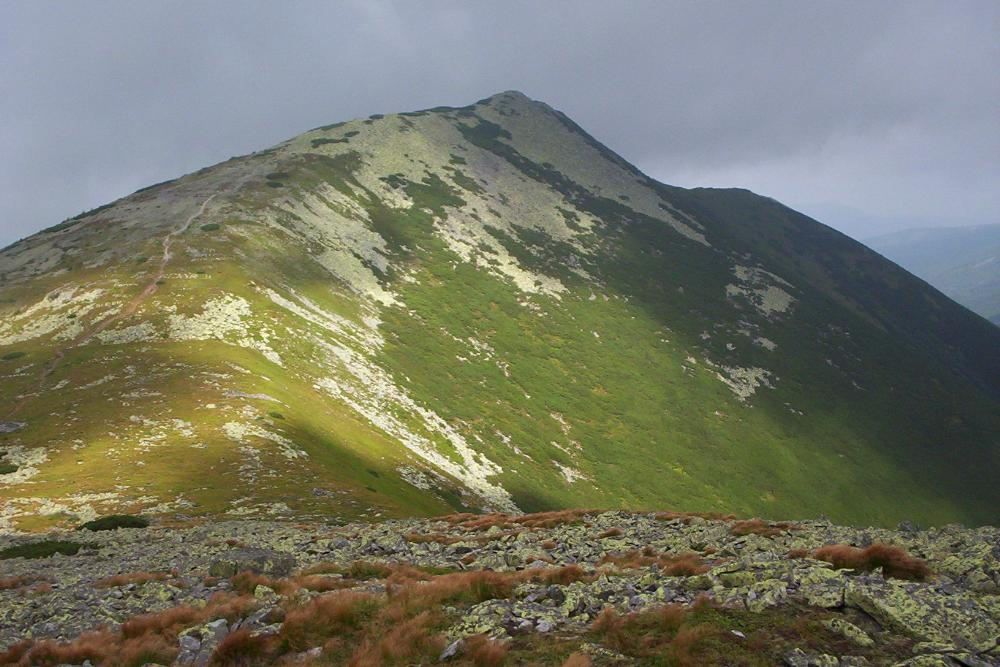
Wielka Sywula

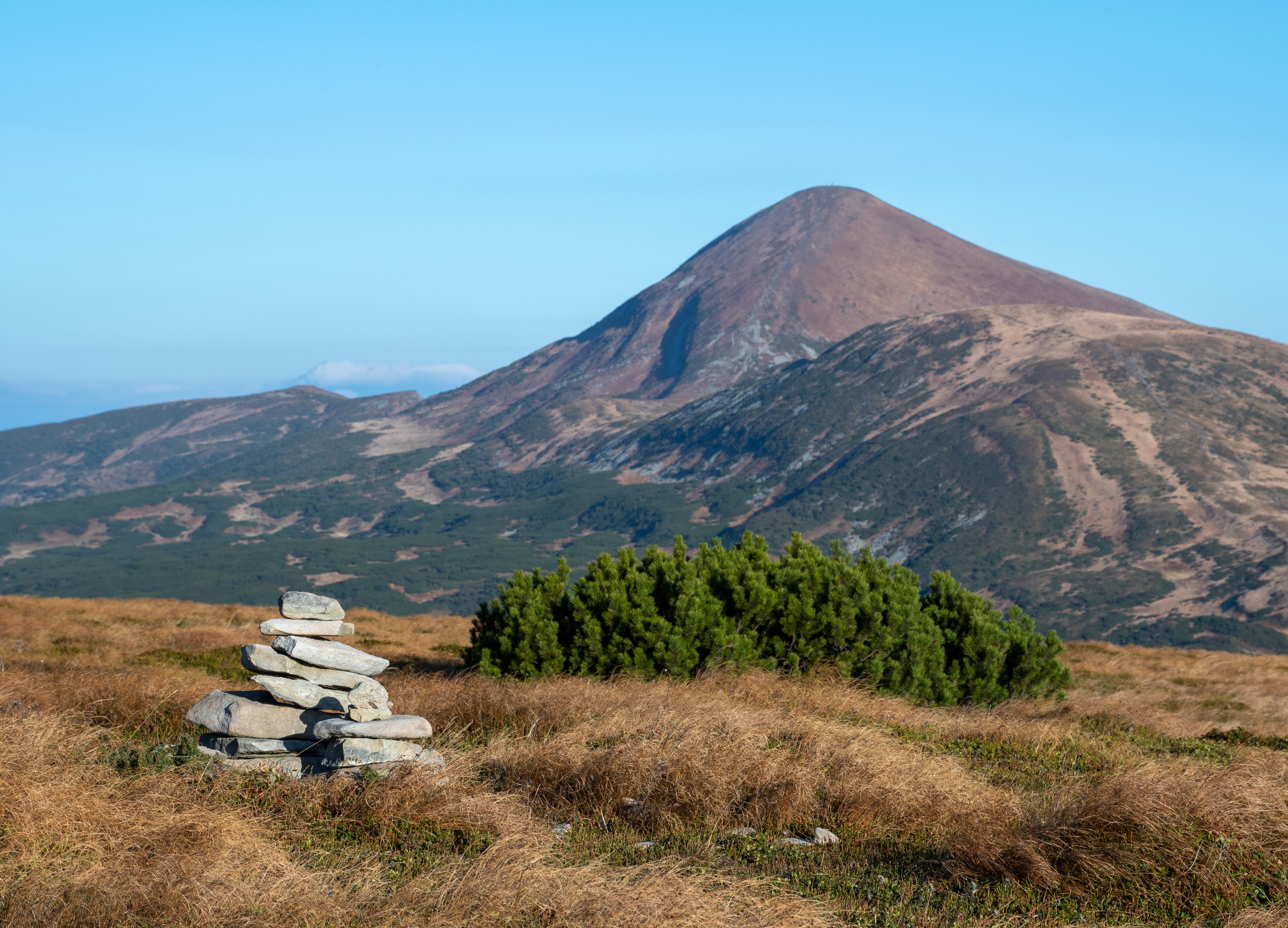
Hoverla

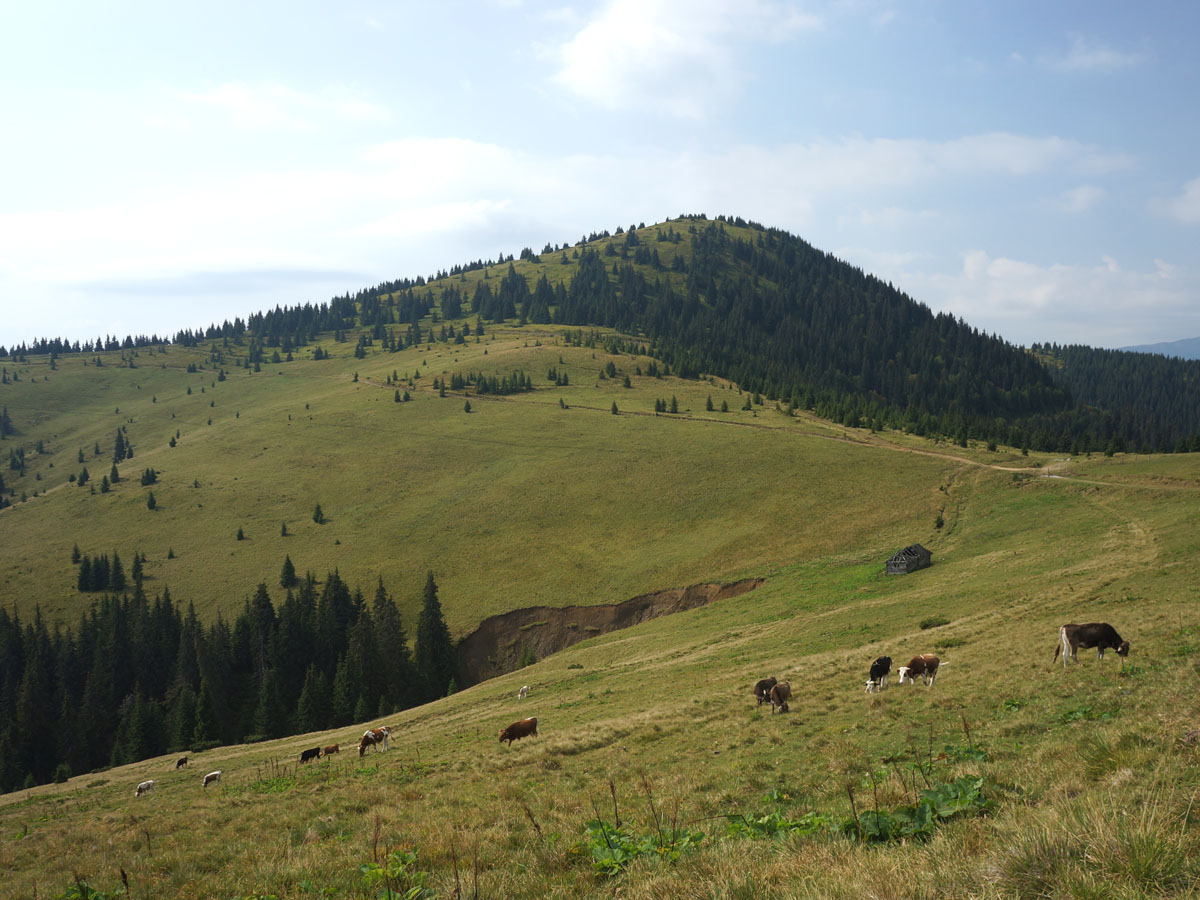
Stóg

=== Endpoints ===
==== Ustroń ====
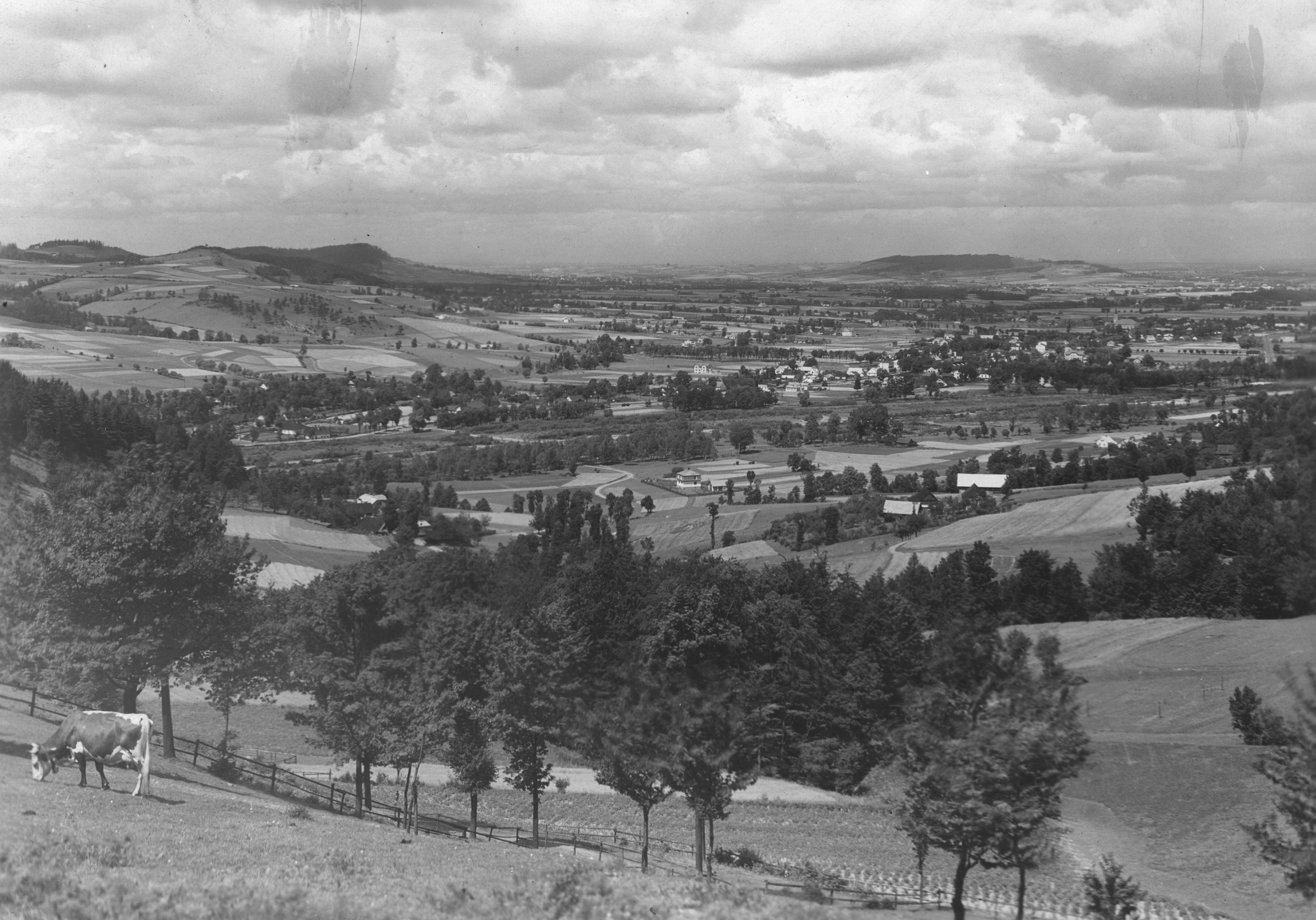
Panorama of Ustroń from the slopes of Czantoria (1920s–1930s)

The original starting point of the Main Western Beskid Trail was the Ustroń railway station. From there, it led through the village southwards to the mouth of the Poniwiec stream valley, where it turned southwest. This valley trail followed the white-blue-white Beskidenverein markers to Czantoria. In 1930, shortly after the opening of the new Ustroń Polana railway station, the Polish Tatra Society marked a new trail to Czantoria from the vicinity of this station, passing through Kończyn. At that time, the starting point of the main trail was moved to Polana. Three years later, another new trail from Polana to Czantoria was marked, running along the southern slopes of the Suchy stream valley, which then received the red markings of the main trail.

During the same period, there were also trails leading from the center of Ustroń to Równica (green and red), and from there to Polana (red-white). However, this loop – unlike the modern Main Beskid Trail – was not considered part of the main trail. Furthermore, according to the marking guidelines adopted at the end of 1930 (which reserved the color red almost exclusively for the main trail and excluded marking with this color for trails that shared points with it), the marking of the Polana–Równica trail was changed to blue, aligning it with the existing Równica–Salmopol trail.

==== Hutsul Beskids ====
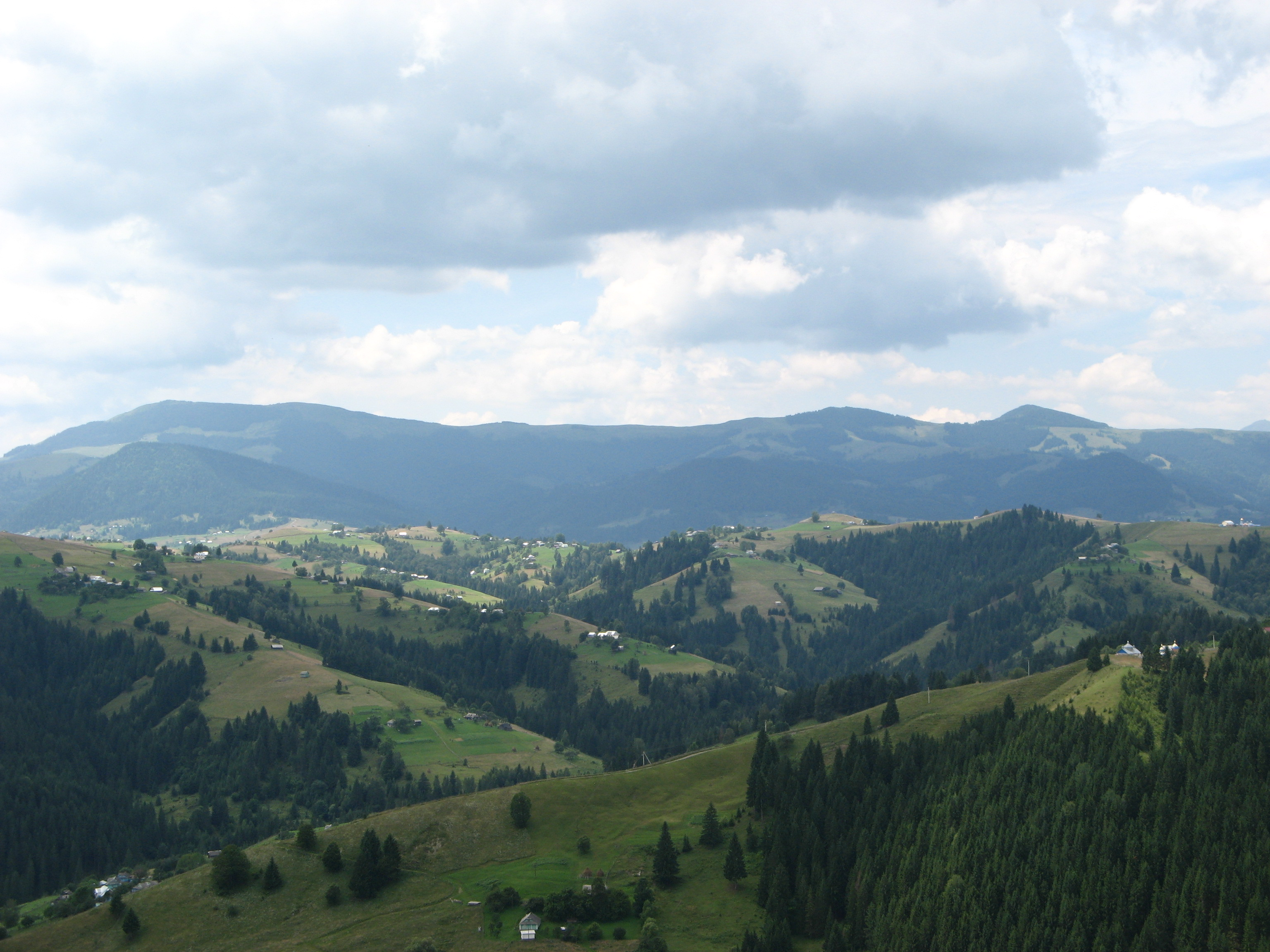
Skupowa

While the western end of the Main West Beskid Trail in Ustroń generally raises no doubts, precisely determining the endpoint in the southeast currently presents significant difficulties. According to the plan adopted in 1930 by the East Beskid Commission of the Polish Tatra Society, the trail was to end at Stóg, descending from Pip Ivan to reach it. This same route was mentioned in memoirs published in 1988 by Władysław Midowicz, who managed the observatory on Pip Ivan from 1938 to 1939. However, it remains uncertain if and when the Main Carpathian Trail was extended to Stóg and whether this peak indeed served as its endpoint.

In the 1933 report by the Polish Tatra Society Commission for Mountain Works, it was indicated that the trail was marked in red as an extension to the east of the main trail on the section Turkul—[…]—Pip Ivan—Szybeny—Burkut, thus bypassing Stóg from the north. (Note: In 1935, the red trail was restored on the section from the Zaroślak mountain hut to Pip Ivan. On the map attached to the Historical and Tourist Guide to the Gorgany and Chornohora by Adam Lenkiewicz from 1937 (based on maps from the Military Geographical Institute), the trail after passing Pip Ivan towards Shybene is described as unmarked in the terrain.) Additionally, the 1935 annual Wierchy reported that the trail runs from Cieszyn to the vicinity of Burkut.

At the same time, various sources suggest that the original Polish Tatra Society plan envisioned a future extension of the trail in the Czywczyn Mountains beyond Stóg, to the southernmost point of Poland – known as Rozrogi, located beyond Hnatasia. From there, the trail was supposed to descend to Hryniawa. These plans included the construction of small mountain huts on Kopilasz, in the Popadyniec stream valley, and on Bałtagul. This plan was abandoned by 1936 at the latest when the Minister of Communications decided to create a so-called tourist reserve (an area free of tourist infrastructure) in the Hnatasia region.

The revised project, following this decision, aimed to route the main trail along the border ridge of the Czywczyn Mountains from Stóg to Popadia Czywczynska. (Note: Mieczysław Orłowicz, in a newspaper article from March 1939, generally indicates that the Main Carpathian Trail in the territory of the Stanisławów Voivodeship was marked from Klymets all the way to Czywczyn – that is, the main peak of the range just before Popadia.) From there, the trail was to descend northward through the Popadyniec valley to the confluence of this stream with the Black Cheremosh river. (Note: The red-marked trail from Popadia through the Popadyniec valley was established as early as 1930.) After crossing the river, the trail would ascend to Baba Ludowa in the Hryniawski Range. Passing the Polish Tatra Society mountain hut on Masny Prysłup, Hala Michajłowa (the highest peak of the range), Hala Lukavytsia, Ludova, and the Polish Tatra Society mountain hut on Skupowa, the trail, through Zhmiensky and Krety, was supposed to reach its endpoint in Verkhovyna.

In the 1937 guide by Adam Lenkiewicz, it is mentioned that by that time the trail had not been marked south of Pip Ivan, […] in the Czywczyn Mountains. Nevertheless, the attached map seems to confirm the trail's extension to Stóg – it marks a trail leading from Pip Ivan towards Stóg, described as marked in the terrain / red. (Note: The actual Stóg peak is located outside of the map sheet. The map covering the same area from the Military Geographical Institute was published in 1933 and did not receive any updates. On this map, the red main trail ends just after Hoverla. The "Burkut" sheet, covering the Stóg peak area, also does not mark the trail. However, it was issued in 1932, and in 1938, it was reissued as "partially supplemented". Nevertheless, none of the reports on mountain works by any of the Polish Tatra Society branches mentioned the marking of a trail to Stóg. Specifically, the Chornohora branch of the Polish Tatra Society in Kolomyia indicated that in 1934, no new trails were marked.) At the same time, the Polish Tatra Society Management report up to March 1937 indicates that the main trail ends in Zhabie. According to the June 1939 publication by Władysław Krygowski, the trail also ends in Zhabie, although the attached schematic map at a scale of 1:600,000 suggests that it led from Pip Ivan to Stóg, and then possibly through further peaks of Kopilasz and Kiernichny, descending to Burkut and following the Black Cheremosh river towards Zhabie.

Despite these circumstances, the endpoint of the trail in the east was still debated during the 1938 Polish Tatra Society members' congress. In December of that year, a few months before the outbreak of World War II, the Polish Tatra Society Mountain Badge Commission extended the officially recognized length of the main trail, stipulating that it would lead not to Burkut, but to Hnitesa.

==== Trans-Olza ====
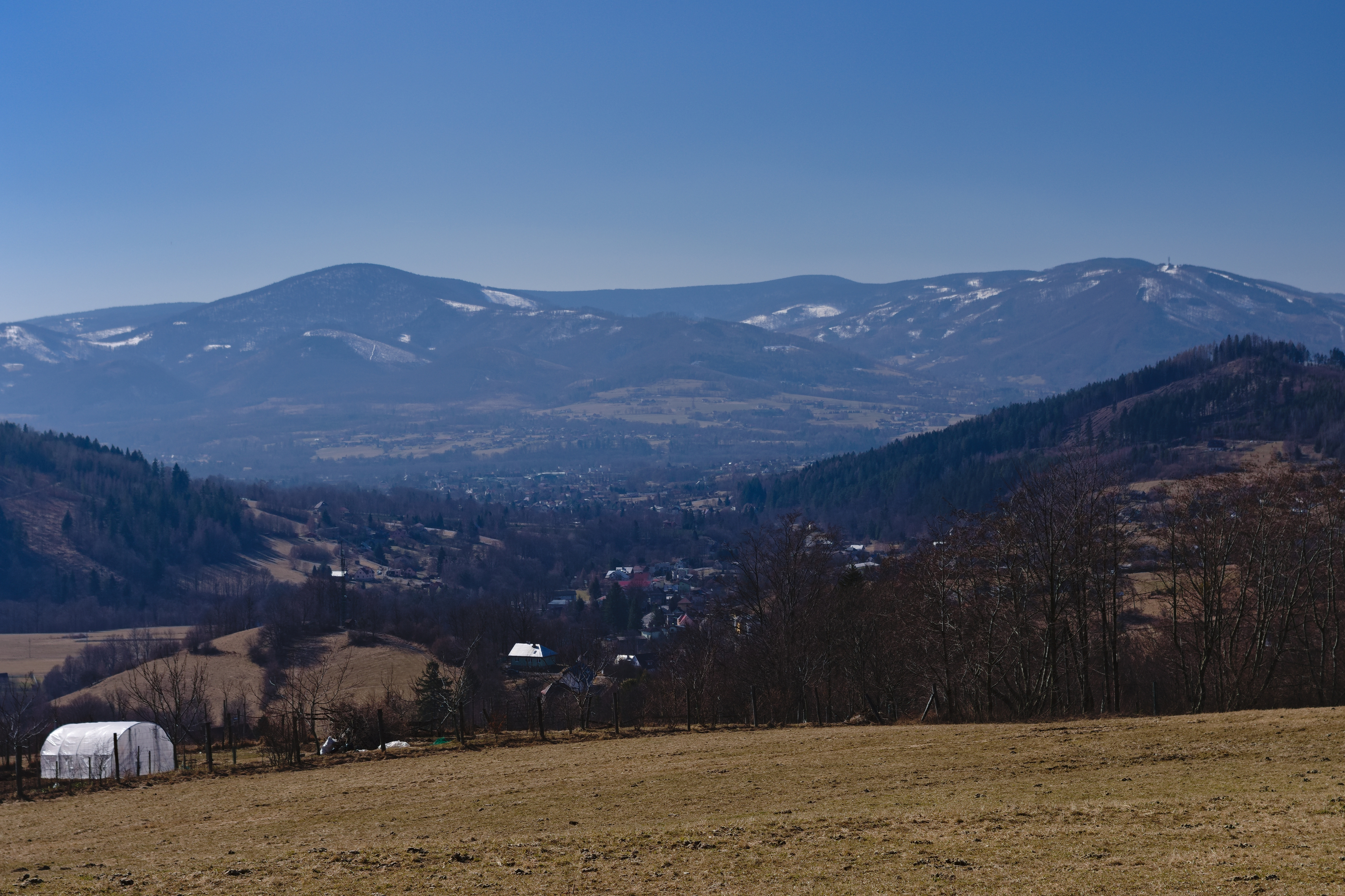
Ropice

At the same time, following the occupation of Trans-Olza in the autumn of 1938, a decision was made by the Polish Tatra Society authorities in May 1939 to adjust the course of the Main Carpathian Trail to encompass the entirety of the Carpathian Mountains remaining within the new borders of Poland. Instead of turning north towards Czantoria and Ustroń from Kiczory near Stożek, as originally planned, the trail coming from Barania Góra was redesigned along the route of the Czechoslovak red trail (known as the Bezručova stezka) in a southwest direction. The path first descended 550 m to the Olza valley at Písek, then ascended back to Girova. Further, around Mosty u Jablunkova (Jablunkov Pass), the trail entered what is now the Moravian-Silesian Beskids. After crossing the Ošetnice stream, it ascended to Velký Polom and Malý Polom, where it turned north. It passed through the highest peak in the ridge, Ropice, then led to Prašivá. The trail ended in the vicinity of the village of Komorní Lhotka. (Note: In brief press reports from the era, the neighboring villages of Komorní Lhotka and Hnojník are mentioned as the endpoint (starting point) of the trail. The Czechoslovak red trail, which served as the basic extension of the Main Carpathian Trail, ended at the nearby Dobratice pod Prašivou. Most likely, after the establishment of the new red trail from Komorní Lhotka to Prašivá, the color of the last section of the previous trail to Dobratice was changed to green.)

The newly annexed section of the trail passed by several mountain huts previously belonging to the Czechoslovak Tourist Club, Beskidenverein, and private individuals (the former were transferred to Polish organizations, mainly the Polish Tatra Society). These mountain huts included those at Girova (Polish Tatra Society), Skalka (Beskidenverein), under Velký Polom along with Dolní Lomná (Polish Tatra Society), Slavíč (private, Beskidenverein), Ropice (Polish Tatra Society), under Lipí (private), and at Malá Prašivá (Polish Tatra Society).

=== Variant trails ===
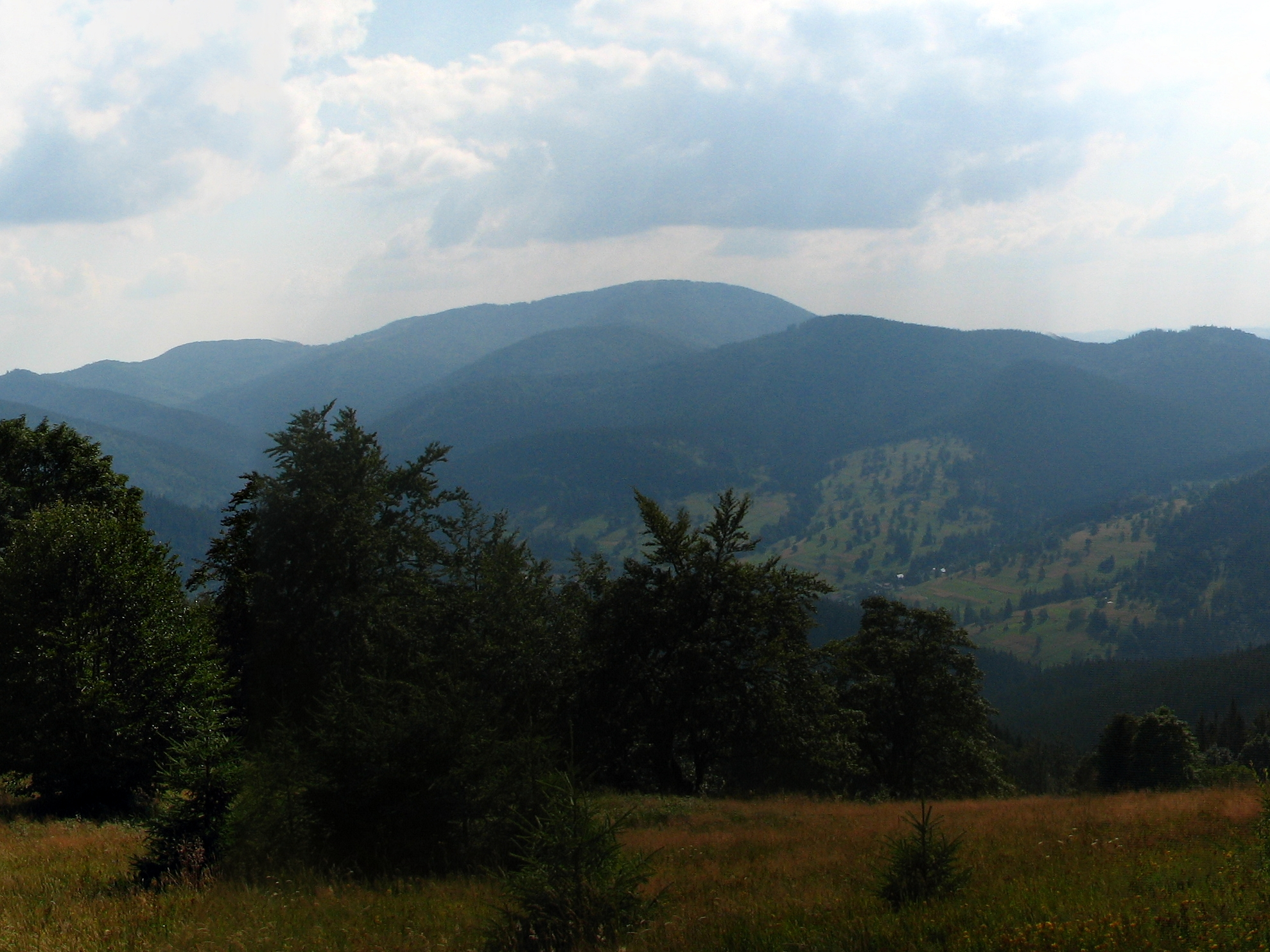
Wielka Racza

Although according to the concept, the Main Carpathian Trail (previously Western Beskid Trail) was supposed to lead through the most important and interesting places in the Polish mountains, sometimes it was impossible to logically connect all sections into one main trail. Therefore, the concept of supplementing the trail's route with variant sections marked with white-blue-white signs appeared quite early. These include the circular Raczanski Trail in the Żywiec Beskids (from Barania Gora through Zwardoń, Wielka Racza, Glinka Pass to Pilsko – bypassing Wegierska Gorka; 1928–1929), the Podhale trail (from Polica through Żeleźnica to Stare Wierchy in the Gorce Mountains – bypassing Jordanów and Rabka; 1930–1932), and the Pieniny Trail (bypassing Krościenko and Przehyba, 1926–1928). In 1938, a variant trail was established in the Low Beskids near Rymanów and Iwonicz. Additionally, in the Eastern Bieszczady Mountains, a variant trail was marked along the border ridge between Jawornik Wielki and Czarna Repa (bypassing Sławsko). Similar bypasses were planned in the Gorgany Mountains in the Bratkowska Range and in the Hutsul Beskids.

== Bibliography ==
- Galicz, Jan (1931). Przewodnik po Beskidzie Śląskim od Baraniej po Ostrawicę i Śląsku Cieszyńskim z szczególnem uwzględnieniem miasta Cieszyna (in Polish). Cieszyn: Beskid Śląski.
- Gąsiorowski, Henryk (1933). Przewodnik po Beskidach Wschodnich (in Polish). Vol. I, II. Lviv – Warsaw: Książnica-Atlas.
- Lenkiewicz, Adam; Niedenthal, Władysław (1937). "Część II turystyczna". In Moszczeński, Józef (ed.). Szlakiem II Brygady Legionów Polskich w Karpatach Wschodnich. Przewodnik historyczno-turystyczny po Gorganach i Czarnohorze (in Polish). Warsaw: Wojskowe Biuro Historyczne.
- Midowicz, Władysław (1988). "Jak powstawał główny szlak karpacki" (PDF). Płaj (in Polish). 2. Warsaw: Studenckie Koło Przewodników Beskidzkich. ISSN 1230-5898.
- Organ, Michał (2021). Grata, Paweł (ed.). ""120 kilometrów samotności". Główny Szlak Karpacki im. Marszałka Józefa Piłsudskiego na terenie Bieszczadów Zachodnich" (PDF). Journal of Humanities and Social Sciences (in Polish). 2 (19). Rzeszów: Wydawnictwo Uniwersytetu Rzeszowskiego. ISSN 2543-8379.
- Sosnowski, Kazimierz (1926). Przewodnik po Beskidach Zachodnich : od Krynicy po granicę Moraw łącznie z Pieninami i terenami narciarskiemi (in Polish) (II ed.). Kraków: Orbis.
- Sosnowski, Kazimierz (1930). Przewodnik po Beskidach Zachodnich : od Krynicy po granicę Moraw łącznie z Pieninami i terenami narciarskiemi (in Polish). Vol. II (III ed.). Kraków: Orbis.
- Sprawozdanie z działalności Polskiego Towarzystwa Tatrzańskiego w Krakowie za okres od 1. IV. 1932 r. do 2. IV. 1933 r. (PDF) (in Polish). Kraków: Polskie Towarzystwo Tatrzańskie. 1933.
- Sprawozdanie z działalności Polskiego Towarzystwa Tatrzańskiego w Krakowie za okres od 3. IV. 1933 r. do 31. III. 1934 r. oraz finansowe za rok 1933 (PDF) (in Polish). Kraków: Polskie Towarzystwo Tatrzańskie. 1934.
- Sprawozdanie z działalności Polskiego Towarzystwa Tatrzańskiego w Krakowie za okres od 1. IV. 1934 r. do 31. III. 1935 r. oraz finansowe za rok 1934 (PDF) (in Polish). Kraków: Polskie Towarzystwo Tatrzańskie. 1935.
- Sprawozdanie z działalności Polskiego Towarzystwa Tatrzańskiego w Krakowie za okres od 1. IV. 1935 r. do 31. III. 1936 r. oraz finansowe za rok 1935 (PDF) (in Polish). Kraków: Polskie Towarzystwo Tatrzańskie. 1936.
- Sprawozdanie z działalności Polskiego Towarzystwa Tatrzańskiego w Krakowie za okres od 1. IV. 1936 do 31. III. 1937 r. oraz finansowe za rok 1936 (PDF) (in Polish). Kraków: Polskie Towarzystwo Tatrzańskie. 1937.
- Sprawozdanie z działalności Polskiego Towarzystwa Tatrzańskiego w Krakowie za okres od 1 I 1938 r. do 31 XII 1938 r. oraz finansowe za rok 1938 (PDF) (in Polish). Kraków: Polskie Towarzystwo Tatrzańskie. 1939.
- "Wiadomości Ziem Górskich". Związek Ziem Górskich (in Polish). 6. Warsaw. 1939-06-01.
- "Wierchy". Oddział Lwowski Polskiego Towarzystwa Tatrzańskiego (in Polish). 3. Lviv: Altenberg Publishing. 1925.
- "Wierchy". Oddział Lwowski Polskiego Towarzystwa Tatrzańskiego (in Polish). 5. Lviv: Altenberg Publishing. 1927.
- "Wierchy". Oddział Lwowski Polskiego Towarzystwa Tatrzańskiego (in Polish). 7. Lviv: Altenberg Publishing. 1929.
- "Wierchy". Oddział Lwowski Polskiego Towarzystwa Tatrzańskiego (in Polish). 8. Lviv: Altenberg Publishing. 1930.
- "Wierchy". Oddział Lwowski Polskiego Towarzystwa Tatrzańskiego (in Polish). 9. Lviv: Altenberg Publishing. 1931.
- "Wierchy". Zarząd Główny Polskiego Towarzystwa Tatrzańskiego (in Polish). 13. Kraków: Gebethner i Wolff. 1935.
- "Wierchy". Zarząd Główny Polskiego Towarzystwa Tatrzańskiego (in Polish). 14. Kraków: Gebethner i Wolff. 1936.
- "Wierchy". Zarząd Główny Polskiego Towarzystwa Tatrzańskiego (in Polish). 16. Kraków: Gebethner i Wolff. 1938.
