= Dzembronia =

Dzembronia (Ukrainian: Дземброня) may refer to the following places in Ukraine:

- Dzembronia (mountain)
- Dzembronia (village)
