= Smotrych =

Smotrych may refer to one of these geographical features or settlements in western Ukraine:

- Smotrych (mountain), a hill of the Chornohora mountain range
- Smotrych (river), which flows through Khmelnytskyi Oblast
  - Smotrych canyon (uk), formed by the eponymous river
- Smotrych (urban-type settlement), an urban-type settlement in Kamianets-Podilskyi Raion of Khmelnytskyi Oblast
- Smotrych (village) (uk), a village in Kamianets-Podilskyi Raion of Khmelnytskyi Oblast
