= Dzembronia (mountain) =

Mountain in Ukraine

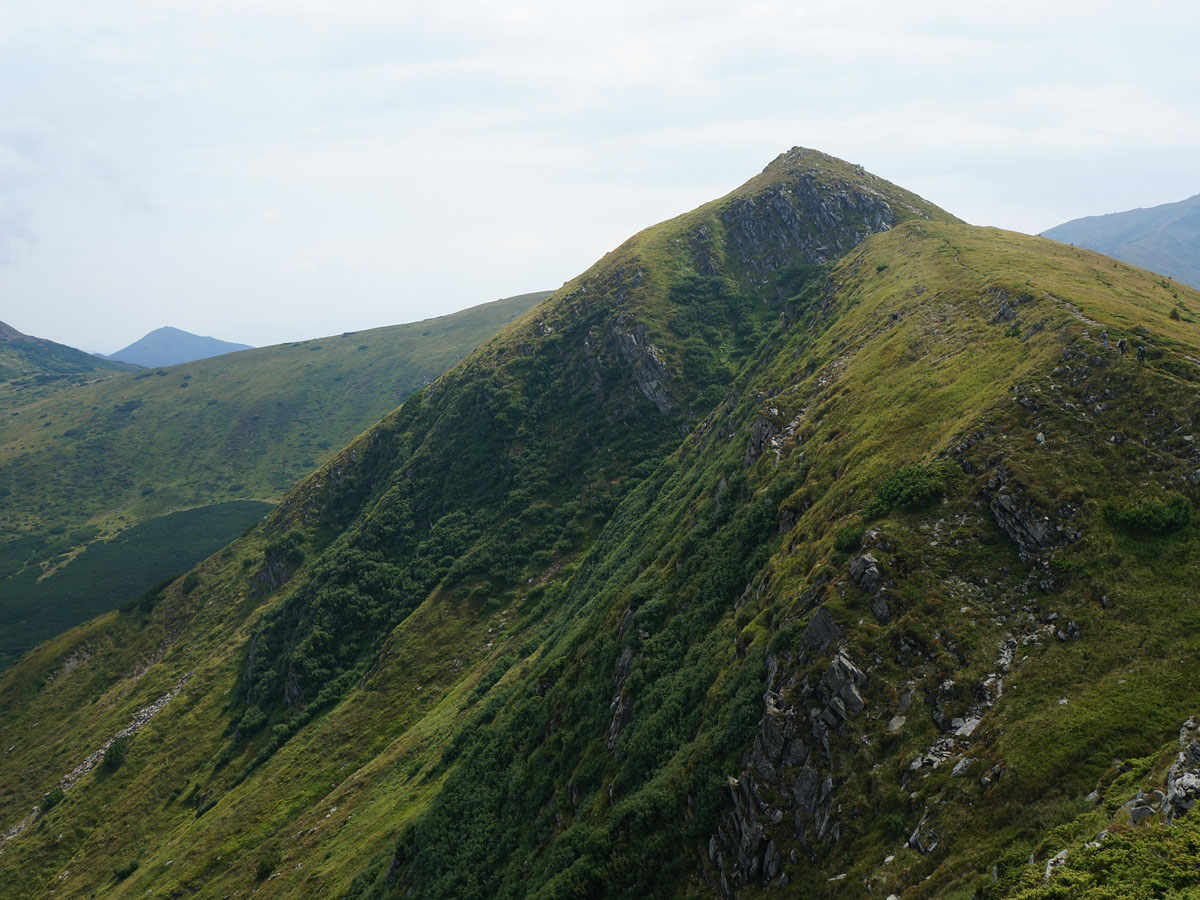
- View of Dzembronia

Highest point
- Elevation: 1,877 m (6,158 ft)
- Coordinates: 48°04′03″N 24°36′19″E

Geography
- Location within Ukraine
- Location: Ukraine
- Country: Ukraine
- Parent range: Chornohora

Dzembronia (Ukrainian: Дземброня) is a 1,877-metre (6,158 ft) peak located in the Chornohora (Чорногора) mountain range of Carpathian Mountains in western Ukraine. It is situated on the border of the Ivano-Frankivsk and Zakarpattia Oblast.

== Etymology ==
The origin of the name Dzembronia is unclear. Some researchers suggest that the initial sound Dz- in standard Ukrainian should correspond to the sound Z-, and the cluster -em- is a remnant of the sound -ę-, which in Ukrainian turned into the sound -u-. This led to the assumption that the name Dzembronia, via the early, Polish-influenced adjectival form *zǫbrъ ("toothed, serrated, jagged"), may derive from the Proto-Slavic word *zǫbъ - "tooth", e.g. in the meaning of a rock protrusion. The archaic suffix -on(ia) in toponymy was used to indicate that a given object has a specific feature.

== Geography ==
Dzembronia rises to a height of 1,877 m (6,158 ft) above sea level with a prominence of 78 m (256 ft) and isolation of only 1 km (0.62 mi). Dzembronia is lower than both neighboring peaks: Menchul in the north (1998 m above sea level) and Pip Ivan in the south (2028 m above sea level; halfway between Dzembonia and Pip Ivan there is still unremarkable kopa with a height of 1851 m above sea level). It is separated from them by not very deep passes with a height of approx. 1800 m above sea level. On the eastern, Galician slopes, there are springs of the river of the same name, while on the western, Transcarpathian side, the Balzatul stream flows, having its beginning on the slopes of Pip Ivan.

== Tourism and nature conservation ==
The Transcarpathian Tourist Trail, marked in red, runs through the top of the main ridge of Chornohora. The closest access to the peak from the valleys leads: from the east side from the village of Dzembronia (the blue trail through Smotrych or Vukhatyi Kamin, and then the yellow trail to the main ridge between Dzembronia and Pip Ivan) and from the west side from the village of Hoverla the blue trail and then the yellow trail to the top of Brebeneskul.

The slopes on the eastern side are within the boundaries of the Carpathian National Nature Park.
