= Girova =

- Girowa
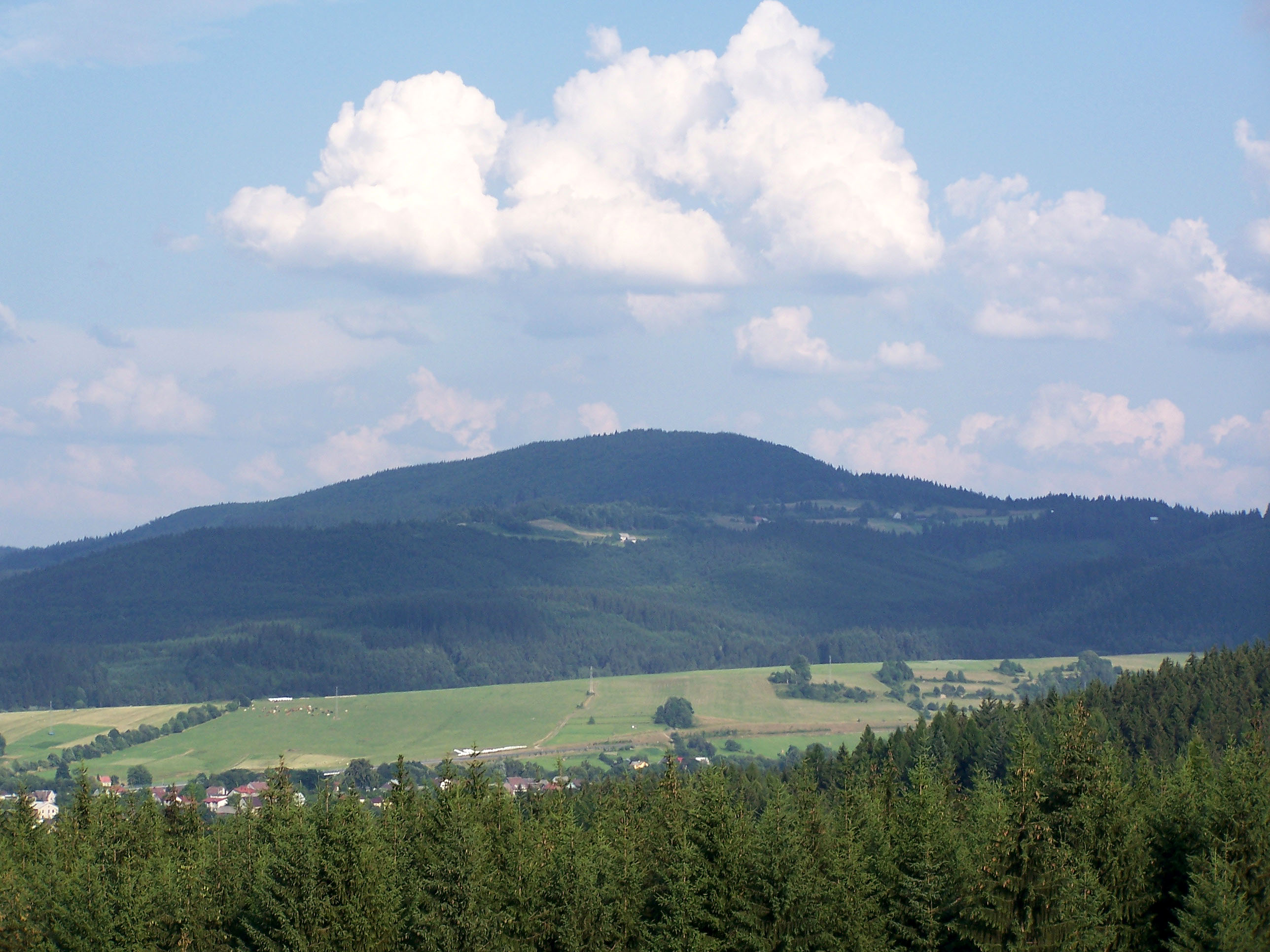
- Gírová seen from Moravian-Silesian Beskids

Highest point
- Elevation: 840 m (2,760 ft)
- Prominence: 235 m (771 ft)
- Isolation: 5.5 km (3.4 mi)
- Coordinates: 49°31′54″N 18°47′59″E

Geography
- Location within Czech Republic
- Location: Czech Republic
- Parent range: Jablunkov Intermontane

Climbing
- Easiest route: Hike

Girova, also spelled Girová (Polish: Girowa), is a mountain in the Moravian-Silesian Region of the Czech Republic. At 840-metre-high (2,756 ft), it is the second highest mountain of the Jablunkov Intermontane mountain range and the highest one of the Czech part of the range.

== Geography ==
Girova is located in the municipal territory of Bukovec. The top of the mountain is located about 36 kilometres (22 mi) southeast of Frýdek-Místek and 48 km (30 mi) southeast of Ostrava, and 1.9 km (1.2 mi) north of the border with Slovakia and 2.9 km (1.8 mi) west of the border with Poland.

== Tourism ==
There is a mountain hut on the mountain, at the elevation of 790 m (2,590 ft). It was opened on 16 October 1932 by the Club of Czechoslovak Tourists. Six year afterwards, the hut was rented by Franciszek Schulhauser, who has been administering it until 1967. During the communist era, the hut was owned by several state companies, and was not fully opened to the tourists. It was only on 4 September 1993, when the hut was fully opened.

There are two tourist trails leading to Girova. One can reach the mountain from Mosty u Jablunkova and Bukovec, the second one from Jablunkov.

There is a ski slope with a ski lift on the northwest slope of the mountain. Around the mountain are maintained cross-country trails.

== Gallery ==
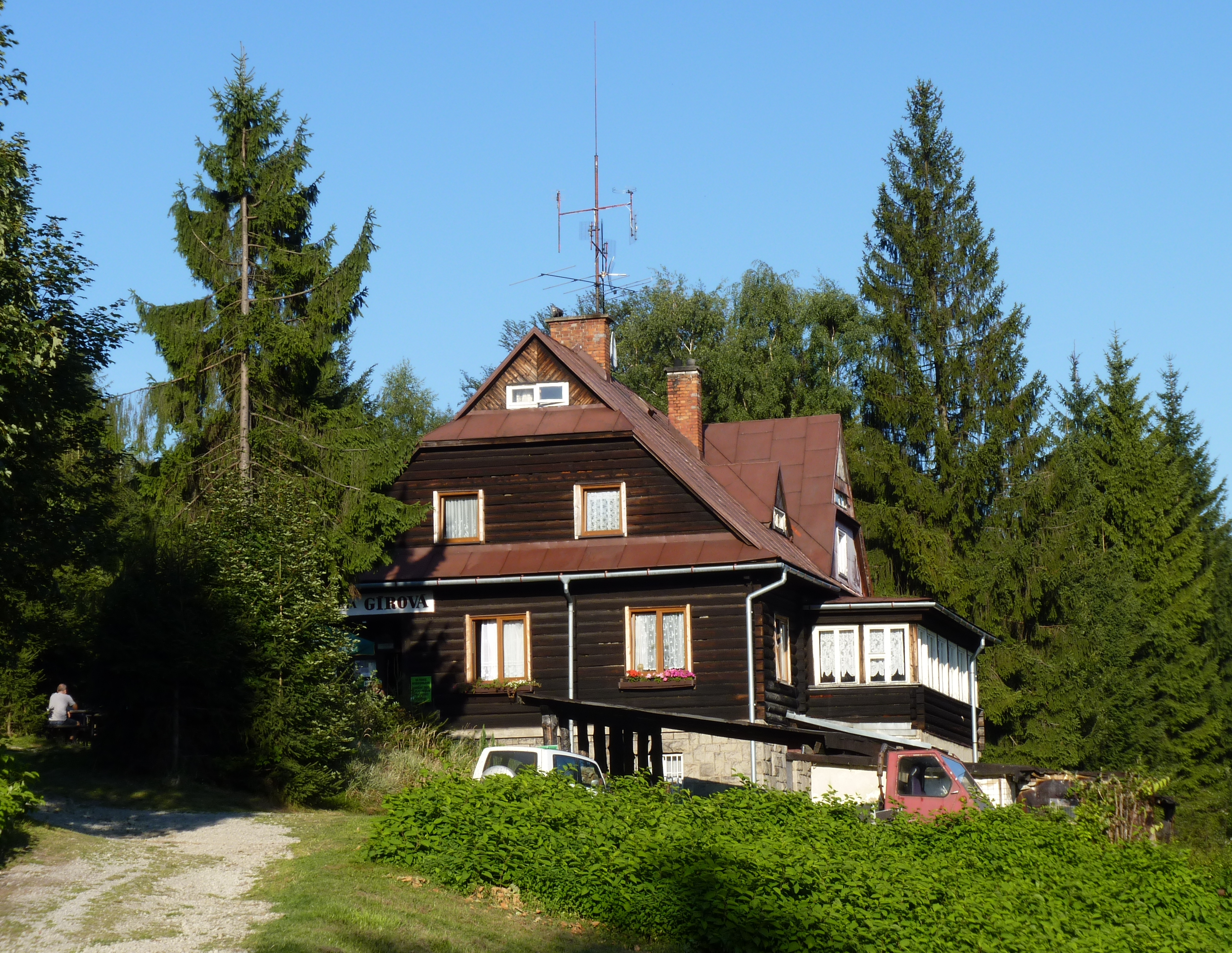
Mountain hut

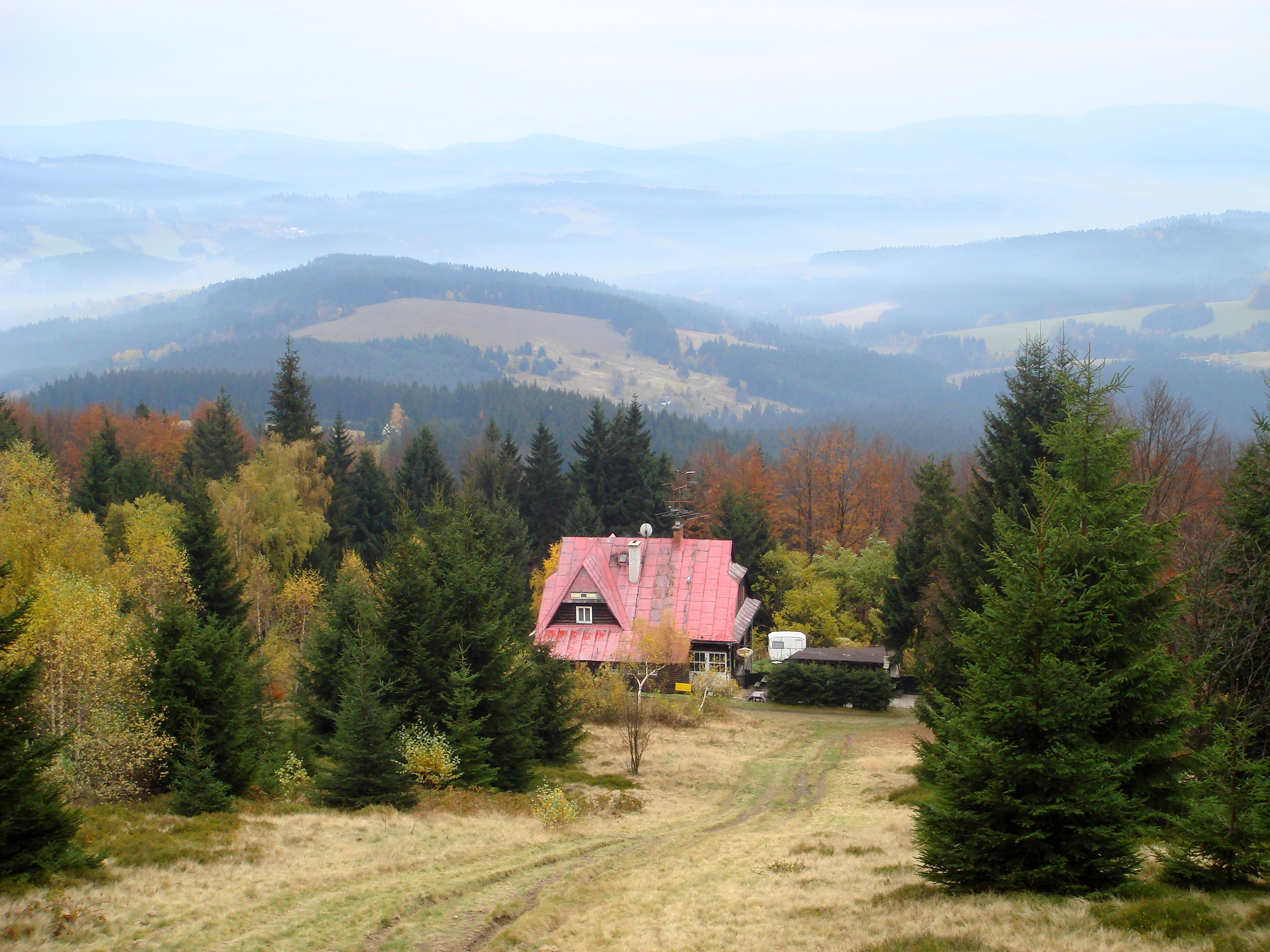
View from Girova in the southeast direction

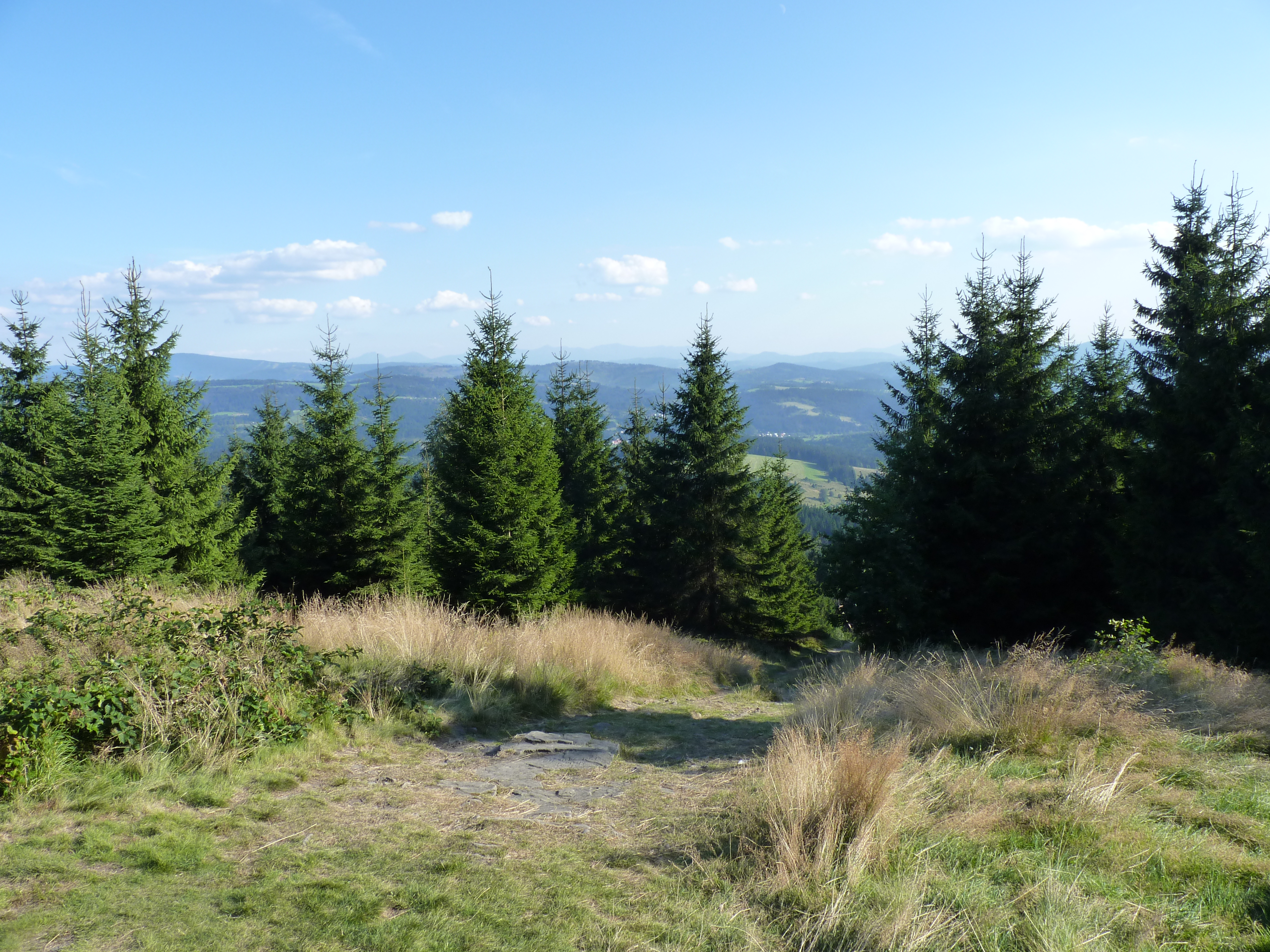
At the summit of the mountain
