= Altenberg Publishing =

Altenberg Publishing Wydawnictwo Altenberga
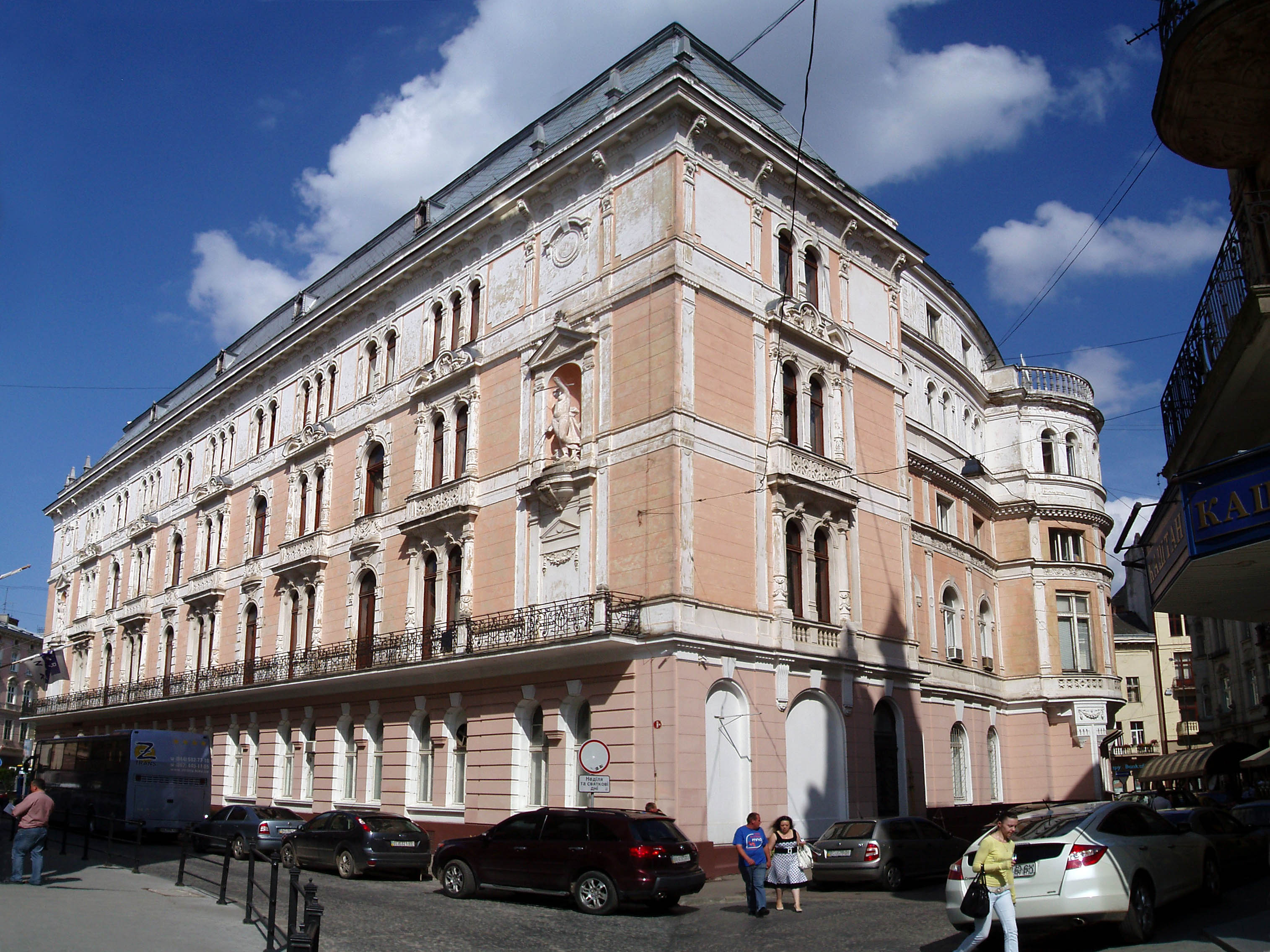
- Location of Altenberg Publishing in 1910-1912 at the Hotel George in Lwów
- Type: Publishing house
- Headquarters: Lwów, Mariacki Square
- Coordinates: 49°50′19.58″N 24°01′50″E
- Official language: Polish
- Leader: Herman Altenberg

Altenberg Publishing (Polish: Wydawnictwo Altenberga) was a Polish publishing house active from 1880 until 1934; first, in the partitioned and later in sovereign Poland. It specialized in publishing high-quality book prints and illustrated albums.

== History ==
The Altenberg Publishing was founded by Herman Altenberg, born in 1848. Altenberg, together with Maurice Robitschki led the Warsaw bookstore with small painting gallery in the years 1872–1879. They were the first in Poland to sell color reproductions of paintings. Altenberg moved to Lwów (now Lviv) in 1880, where he purchased the bookstore with a book rental. The same year, he commissioned painter Michał Elwiro Andriolli to produce a series of illustrations for his edition of Pan Tadeusz by Adam Mickiewicz. The epic poem by Mickiewicz was originally published by Altenberg in monthly brochures and then published in full in 1882 (second edition in a smaller format was adopted in 1921). He had designed the book as a refined album with vignettes and 24 full-page illustrations, including ornamental initials and interludes – which brought the number of illustrations to a total of 58 drawings.

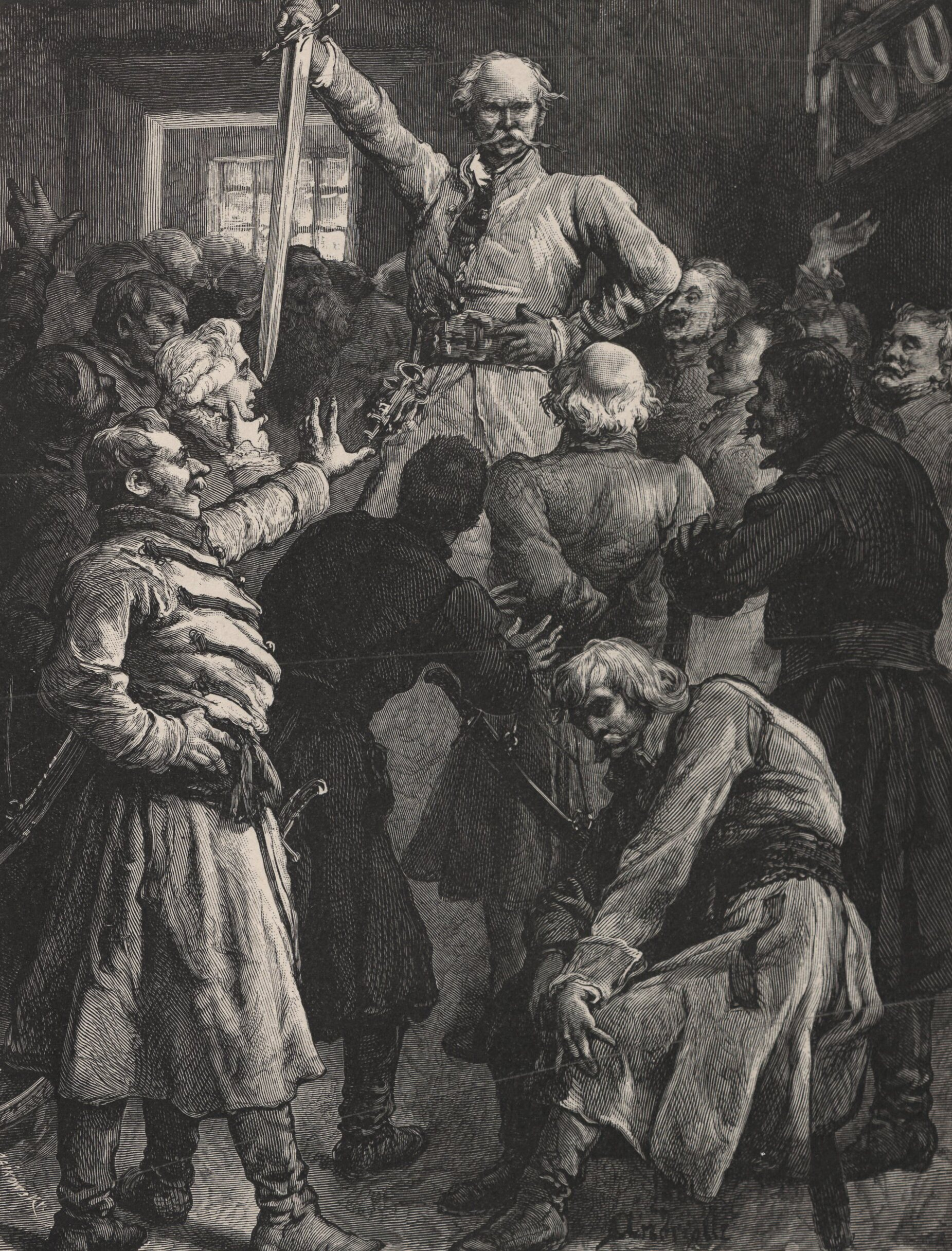
Illustration to Pan Tadeusz commissioned by Altenberg Publishing in 1882 from Michał Elwiro Andriolli

Although exclusively released as Altenberg's limited edition, prints by Andriolli have not been well received by the critics due to preconceived notions about the poem itself. Herman Altenberg besides other classics of Polish literature published also the Fables (Bajeczki) by Józef Ignacy Kraszewski with illustrations by Andriolli, as well as Mohorta by Wincenty Pol with illustrations by Juliusz Kossak. Altenberg was the initiator of a new series called the Polish Classics Library (1882–1909) in which Jan Kochanowski and Stanisław Trembecki were published, and, the Amateur Theatres Library series. He first introduced in Galicia the system of selling books through agents.

After Herman Altenberg's death in 1885 the company was successfully run by his wife, Zuzanna (Susan) née Eber (1851–1921) together with Władysław Bałz. They had published such classics as the Songs of the Legions by Józef Wybicki (author of Poland's national anthem) with illustrations by Kossak as well as Ballady i romanse (Ballads and Romances) collection of widely popular poems by Mickiewicz edited by Ludwik Finkel with illustrations by Andriolli. In 1894, they released the actual illustrated catalog of the books published by Altenberg Publishing for the purpose of sales and promotion. In 1896, the Altenberg Publishing issued a poetic drama Dziady by Mickiewicz, considered one of the great works of European Romanticism. It was the first deluxe edition of Dziady (Forefathers' Eve) illustrated with engravings by Czesław Borys Jankowski, and edited by Wilhelm Bruchnalski.

Within a few years, the Altenberg Publishing run by Zuzanna, received a license to operate bookstores in several different cities including Krynica, Brody, Drohobycz, Jarosław, Rawa Ruska, and Sambor. Zuzanna Altenberg led the company until 1897, when her son Alfred took over the family business.

== Family ownership ==
In 1897 the company was taken over by Alfred Altenberg (born in 1877), the son of Herman Altenberg. Aside from the fine art reproductions, it published books on art and literature including K. Chłędowski, P. Chmielowski, and W. Feldman. As part of a new series of great writers, Alfred Altenberg published also the collections of works by Jan Kasprowicz, Maria Konopnicka, Juliusz Słowacki and more poetry by Mickiewicz. The new series included the Historical Library, the Library of Dramatic Works, and the popular-science Wiedza i Życie ("Knowledge and Life") series. The periodicals included Lamus and satirical Szczutka weekly. Many publications were fitted with high quality hard covers, best paper, carefully selected fonts, formats and illustrations.

In 1907 the company was inherited by Alfred's brother, Maurycy Altenberg who was unable to maintain it. It was saved from bankruptcy in 1912 by the eminent Polish historian and geographer Jan Pawlikowski helped by his own father and a group of concerned publishers, who set it up as a joint venture. In the years 1911–1913 the company was transformed into the H. Altenberg, Seyfarth G, E, Wende & Co. It went on to publish the Księga ubogich (Book of the Impoverished) by Jan Kasprowicz and the Polish Portraits of the 16th to the 19th centuries (Portrety polskie) by Maryia Radziwiłł, edited by Jerzy Mycielski. The company also published the Grześ magazine for children. In 1920 the publishing house sold its bookstore. Soon later, it published (for the first time in full) the epic poem Król Duch (The Spirit King) by Juliusz Słowacki among other things.

After Alfred's death in 1924, the company was run by his wife Jadwiga for the next decade. In 1934 the Altenberg Publishing was liquidated.

== Items released by Altenberg Publishing between 1880 and 1934 ==
=== Literature ===
- Pan Tadeusz by Adam Mickiewicz (1882.1921)
- Fables, Józef Ignacy Kraszewski (1882, 1929)
- Mohort, Vincent de Pol (1883)
- Song of the Legions, Joseph Wybicki (1894, 1910)
- Ballads and Romances, Adam Mickiewicz (1891)
- Dziady, Adam Mickiewicz (1894)
- Uncle Alphonse: Komeda in one act, Stanislaw Dobrzanski (1908)
- Lyrical poetry of Seweryn Goszczyński and Zygmunt Wasilewski (1910)
- Book of poor Jan Kasprowicz (1916) and ed. published by. 3000 copies
- Portraits of Polish sixteenth-nineteenth century Radziwill MJ
- Poetical works of Vincent Fields in two volumes (1921)
- King Spirit Słowacki (1924)

=== Library series ===
- Biblioteki Klasyków Polskich (English, "Polish Classics Library" (1882–1909)
- Biblioteka Teatrów Amatorskich (English, "Library of Amateur Theatre")
- Wielcy pisarze (English, "Great Writers")
- Biblioteka Historyczna (English, "Historical Library")
- Biblioteka Utworów Dramatycznych (English, "Library of Dramatic Works")
- Wiedza i Życie (English, "Knowledge and Life")
- Biblioteka podróży Polskich (English, "Library of Polish Travel")

=== Magazines ===
- Granary
- Szczutka
- Grześ children's magazine (1919–1920)

=== Art albums ===
- Guide to Art: catalog of works of classic and contemporary masters of foreign and Polish reprodukcyach in stock at The Book of H. Altenberg (1903)
- Catalogue of an exhibition of works of Arthur Grottger: decorated efforts bookstore H. Altenberg in Lvov by Marian Olszewski, Wladyslaw Fedorowicz, and with the participation of the City Industrial * Museum in Lviv (1906)
- Catalogue of an exhibition of Mieczyslaw Henry Frederick Pautsch Treter Casimir (1911)

=== Scientific and popular literature ===
- Psychopathic literature in Poland: a contribution to the psychology of creativity by Antoni Jan Mikulski (1908)
- Eliza Orzeszkowa in literature and women's movement: an overview of synthetic Maria Czeslaw Przewoska (1906)
- Konfessya given by members of parliament in the 1555 Piotrkow Louis Finkel (1896)

== Footnotes ==
- Originally it was commissioned to illustrate Kossakowo Julius, but his drawings have not been released and disappeared
- http://literat.ug.edu.pl/dziady/index.htm Example illustration Jankowski
- All the printers in 1920, the Society took over the bookshop Railway Traffic
