= Kazimierz Sosnowski =

Polish geographer

Kazimierz Sosnowski (1875–1954) was a Polish geographer. He designed the western route of the Main Carpathian Trail.
