= Brzegi Górne =

- Village
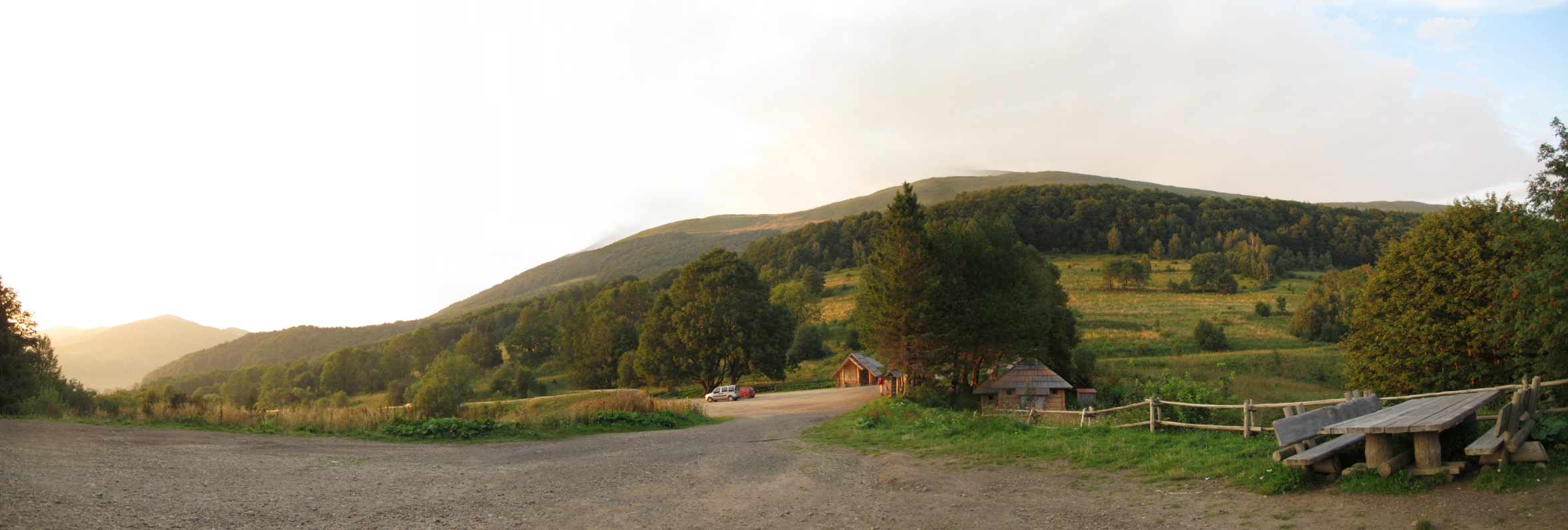
- Brzegi Górne
- Interactive map of Brzegi Górne
- Location within Poland
- Coordinates: 49°8′29″N 22°34′3″E
- Country: Poland
- Voivodeship: Subcarpathian
- County: Bieszczady
- Gmina: Lutowiska
- Elevation: 735 m (2,411 ft)

Population (2020)
  - Total: 6
- Time zone: UTC+1 (CET)
  - Summer (DST): UTC+2 (CEST)

Brzegi Górne [ˈbʐɛɡʲi ˈɡurnɛ], until 1968 Berehy Górne (Береги Горішні) is a village in the administrative district of Gmina Lutowiska, within Bieszczady County, Subcarpathian Voivodeship, in south-eastern Poland, close to the border with Ukraine.
