= Chomiak =

Chomiak is a surname. Notable people with the surname include:

- Dave Chomiak (born 1953), Canadian politician from Manitoba
- María Luisa Chomiak (born 1969), Argentine politician
- Michael Chomiak (1905–1984), Ukrainian lawyer, journalist, and editor
