= Menchul =

Mountain peak in Ukraine

- Менчул
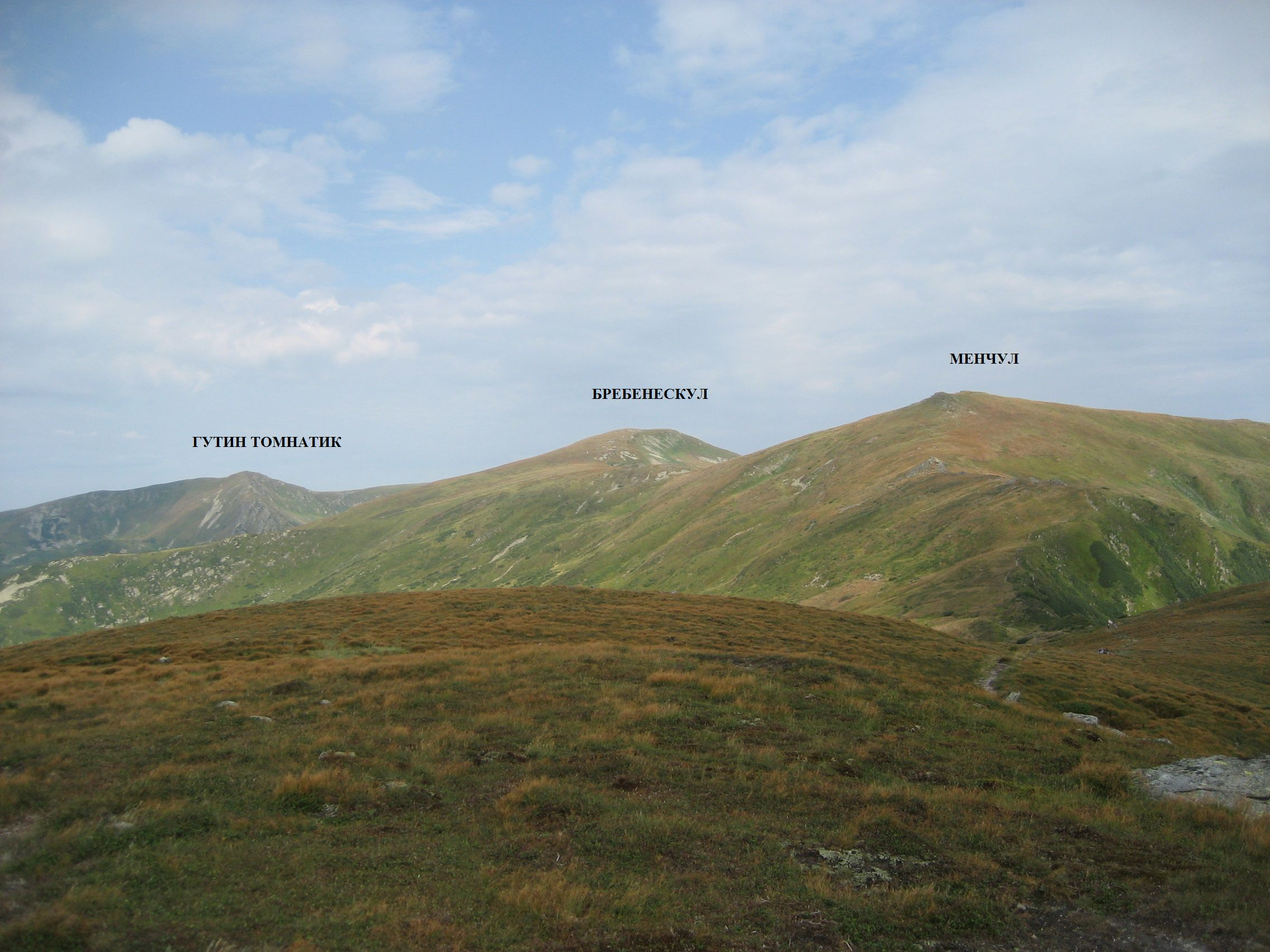

Highest point
- Elevation: 1,998 m (6,555 ft)
- Coordinates: 48°05′30″N 24°35′45″E

Geography
- Location within Ukraine Location within Ivano-Frankivsk Oblast Location within Zakarpattia Oblast
- Country: Ukraine
- Parent range: Carpathian Mountains

Menchul (Ukrainian: Менчул), also Manchul, is a peak in the Chornohora region of Ukraine, with a height of 1,998 meters above sea level. It lies to the southeast of the village of Vilshany in the Uholsko-Shyrokoluzhanskyi Massif of the Carpathian Mountains.
