= Smotrych (mountain) =

Mountain in Ukraine

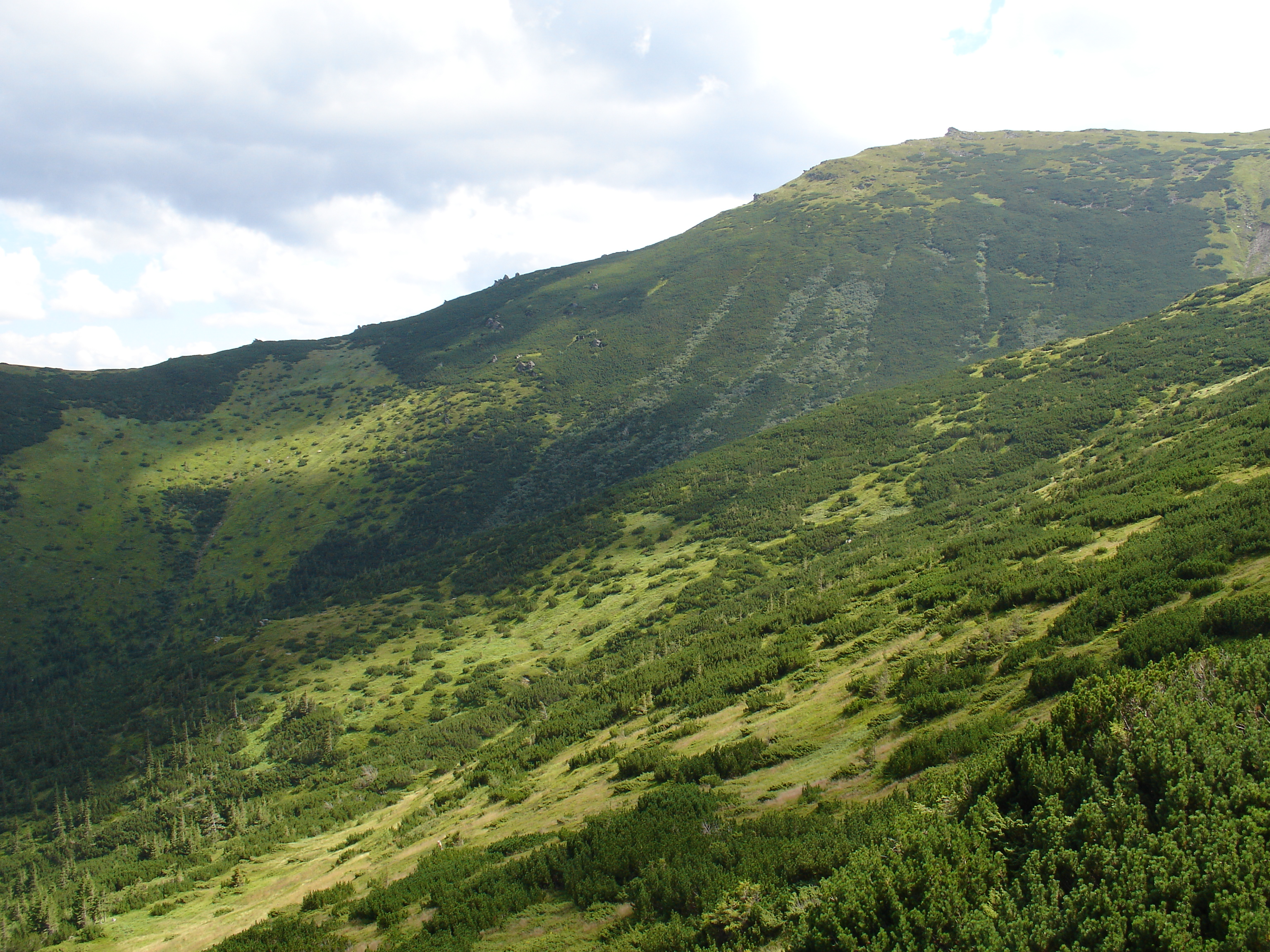
- View of Smotrych

Highest point
- Elevation: 1,898 m (6,227 ft)
- Prominence: 129 m (423 ft)
- Coordinates: 48°04′10″N 24°38′43″E

Geography
- Location within Ukraine
- Location: Ukraine
- Country: Ukraine
- Parent range: Chornohora

Smotrych (Ukrainian: Смотрич) is a 1,898-metre (6,227 ft) peak located in the Chornohora (Чорногора) mountain range of Carpathian Mountains in western Ukraine. It is situated near Dzembronia in Ivano-Frankivsk Oblast.
