= Łukasz Wróbel =

Polish ultramarathon runner

Personal information
- Nickname: Motyla Noga
- Nationality: Polish
- Home town: Leszno
- Occupations: Ultramarathon runner, trail runner, police officer

Sport
- Sport: Ultramarathon

Łukasz Wróbel ("Motyla Noga") – Polish ultramarathon and trail runner and police officer from Leszno. In May 2025 he broke the world record in the Backyard ultra format, running 116 yards (777.896 km) in nearly 5 days (116 hours). Backyard Ultra champion in Poland (2024). He set the Fastest Known Time record on the long distance Main Sudetes Trail and Main Beskid Trail. He is also co-organizer of NiedamiRUN – Sudete Ultramarathon.

== Backyard Ultra ==
=== Polish Championships (2024) ===
In March 2024, Wróbel won the Backyard Ultra Warmia Event, which was his debut in the format. He ran 70 yards (loops that summed to 470 km) in three days despite difficult conditions – it rained with hail for the first 36 hours and the temperature was at 2–4 °C.

=== Suffolk Backyard Ultra (2024) ===
In June 2024 Wróbel won the Suffolk Backyard Ultra in England, running 88 yards (loops), which amounted to 590 km.

=== World record race - Retie, Belgium (2025) ===
Wróbel set a new world record in the Backyard Ultra format in Retie, Belgium during the race that took place from 27 April – 1 May 2025. He ran 116 yards (loops) – for a total of 777.896 km in 115 hours 42 minutes 35 seconds – nearly 5 days. The previous record was 110 yards (loops). Belgian Jan Vandekerckhove was the assist, finishing 115 yards (loops) and 771.19 km.

The record was beaten on June 26, 2025, by Australian runner Phil Gore, who finished Dead Cow Gully in Queensland with 119 yards (loops) amounting to 797 km.

== FKT (Fastest Known Time) ==
=== Main Sudetes Trail ===
In August 2022 Wróbel and Bartosz Fudali ran the Main Sudetes Trail (444 km) self-supported (without assist) in 4 days, 1 hour and 1 minute, running from Prudnik to Świeradowa-Zdrój.

In July 2024 he broke the record again, this time with support, running the distance in 82 hours, 12 minutes (around 3,5 days), sleeping only around 2 hours in this time. He dedicated the run to his son Dawid and through fundraising supported a charity that helps children suffering from cancer, ran by the Przylądek Nadziei hospital in Wrocław.

=== Main Beskid Trail ===
On 29 June 2026 Wróbel set out from Wołosate to run the Main Beskid Trail (about 500 km) in the supported format. He reached the finish in Ustroń on 3 July 2026 in 92 hours, 30 minutes and 46 seconds, improving on the route record of 93 hours, 42 minutes and 22 seconds set by Kamil Leśniak in October 2023. The route has more than 22,000 m of cumulative ascent; Wróbel slept very little during the attempt and afterwards spoke of two severe psychological crises brought on by sleep deprivation.

The attempt doubled as a fundraiser for the "Na Ratunek Dzieciom z Chorobą Nowotworową" foundation, which raised 32,824 zł against a goal of 20,000 zł.
