= Backyard ultra =

Form of ultramarathon

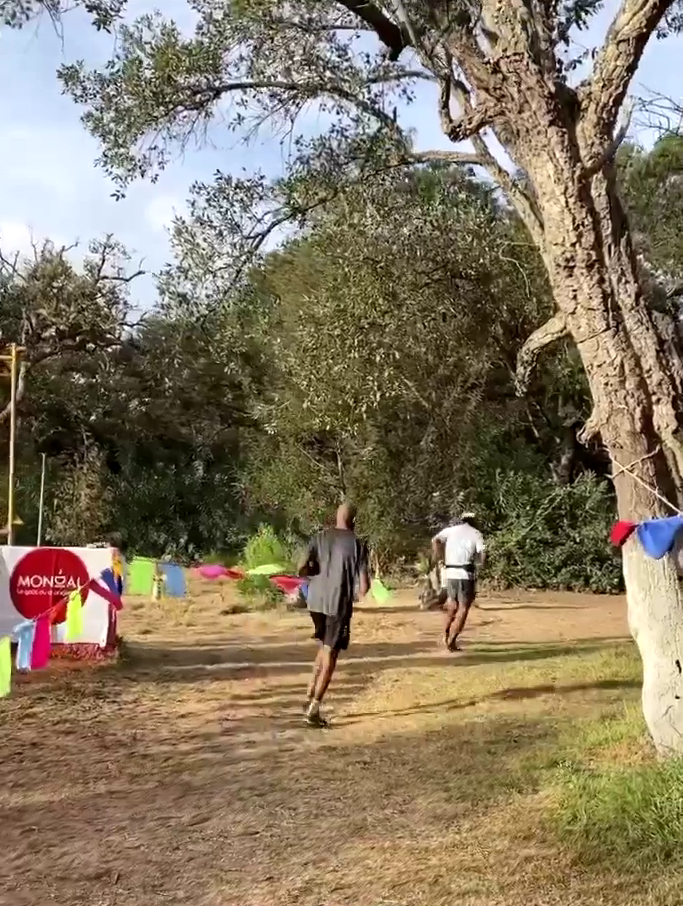
Two finalists starting a new loop

The backyard ultra or last one standing is a form of ultramarathon race where competitors must consecutively run the distance of 6.706 kilometres (4.167 mi) in less than one hour. Each loop, commonly referred to as a "Yard", is ^{100}/_{24} miles, so in 24 hours, a competitor would run 100 miles. They must repeat this every hour until only one person completes a full lap – the last one standing.

The backyard ultra format has gained a reputation for its grueling and unpredictable nature, as well as the camaraderie among participants. Challenges include sleep deprivation, exhaustion, and varying weather conditions.

== History ==
Backyard ultras are the invention of Gary "Lazarus Lake" Cantrell, who is also one of the founders and race directors of the Barkley Marathons.

The original backyard ultra is Big's Backyard Ultra, which is held on Cantrell's property in Bell Buckle, Tennessee, and is named after his dog. First held in 2011, today Big's is an invitational race where the top competitors participate based on wins in a bracket of the various American and international backyard ultras.

== Description ==
A backyard ultra consists of repeated one-hour laps. Each lap begins on the hour and must be completed within that hour. The distance of each lap is set at 4.167 miles (6.706 km), a figure derived to ensure that completing one lap every hour for 24 hours results in exactly 100 miles (160 km) covered in a single day.

The event continues until a single runner completes a lap alone; that runner is declared the winner and the sole official finisher, while all other competitors are recorded as "DNF" (Did Not Finish). If no competitor manages to complete one more lap than the others (for example, if the remaining runners all fail to finish the next lap), the race ends with no winner and all competitors listed as DNF. The competitor who completes the second-most laps is commonly referred to as the "assist".

Rules are strictly enforced across local and championship events; runners must be in the starting corral at the bell, may not receive aid on the course, and cannot leave the course except for restrooms.

The format's published rules also ban artificial aids, trekking poles among them, and bar non-competitors – including runners already eliminated – from accompanying an entrant on the course. The starting corral is measured to hold the entire field and stays the same size for the whole event, and warnings are given three, two and one minutes before each bell.

A shortened variant, the "Backyard 24", is run to a defined finish of up to 24 hours and is named for its length, so that a "Backyard 6" lasts six hours. No winner is declared in these races – participants either finish or are recorded as DNF – and the remaining backyard rules apply unchanged.

== Global growth and impact ==
Since its inception, the backyard ultra format has grown into a global phenomenon. By 2023, events were being held in over 70 countries under an international framework that feeds into a World Championship. Media outlets have noted the format's rapid rise in popularity, attributing it to its accessibility and the "existential" nature of a race with no defined finish line.

The format has also been adapted for virtual events, notably gaining traction during the COVID-19 pandemic when travel was restricted. Beyond the sport itself, the format has drawn attention for its psychological depth; coverage in The New York Times highlighted how the grueling, repetitive nature of the event provided a coping mechanism for Ukrainian runners during wartime.

== Records ==
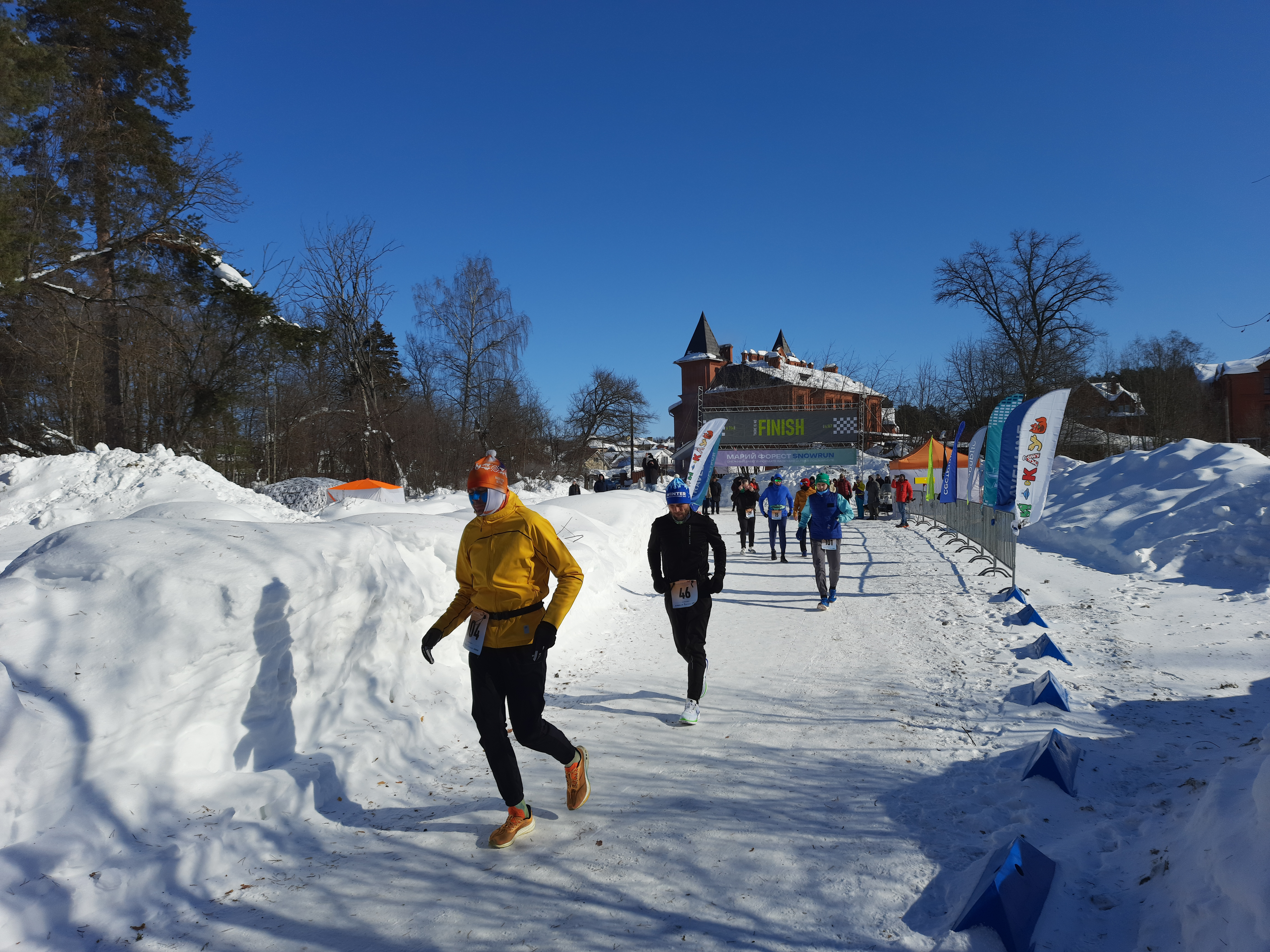
Backyard Ultra Snow Run in Yoshkar-Ola, March 9, 2026. The 49th hour of the race begins

Merijn Geerts and Ivo Steyaert (Belgium) hold the world record of 124 loops (516.67 miles (831.50 km)) at the Backyard Ultra World Team Championship in Retie, Belgium on 22 Oct 2026. This is the third world record set by the pair, and Geerts's fourth world record overall.

The female world record for a backyard ultra performance is 95 laps (395.8 miles (637.0 km)) set by Sarah Perry (United Kingdom) at the 2025 Backyard Ultra World Individual Championship in Tennessee.

Mike Jones (UK) holds the unofficial Tactical Division (10kg weighted vest) world record of 26 loops at the Red On Backyard Ultra, Cheltenham, UK in May 2026.

A Backyard Ultra snow world record of 84 laps was set in Yoshkar-Ola on March 7–10, 2026. Temperatures dropped to −25 °C (−13 °F).

Europes biggest ever Backyard Ultra had 306 participants, held at Cheltenham Race Course by Red On Events in May 2026. The event was won by Jay Stapley with 61 yards (254 miles (408.7km)) completed. The assist was George Jones, with both of them qualifying for the UK Backyard Team Championships.

=== Milestone performances – Men ===
Milestone backyard ultra performances, including world records (WR).

Yards "Loops"	Name	Runner up "Assist"	Date	Event/Place	Notes
124 (WR)	Merijn Geerts (Belgium) and Ivo Steyaert (Belgium)	n/a	22-Oct-2026	Retie, Belgium	Backyard Ultra World Team Championship
119 (WR)	Phil Gore (Australia)	Sam Harvey (New Zealand)	26-Jun-2025	Dead Cow Gully, Qld, Australia	
116 (WR)	Łukasz Wróbel (Poland)	Jan Vandekerckhove (Belgium)	1-May-2025	Legends Backyard Ultra, Retie, Belgium	
110 (WR)	Merijn Geerts (Belgium) , Ivo Steyaert (Belgium) , and Frank Gielen (Belgium)	n/a	24-Oct-2024	Retie, Belgium	Backyard Ultra World Team Championship
108 (WR)	Harvey Lewis (United States)	Ihor Verhys (Canada)	25-Oct-2023	Bigs Backyard Ultra, Tennessee, USA	
102 (WR)	Phil Gore (Australia)	Sam Harvey (New Zealand)	21-Jun-2023	Dead Cow Gully, Qld, Australia	
101 (WR)	Merijn Geerts (Belgium) , Ivo Steyaert (Belgium)	n/a	19-Oct-2022	Kasterlee, Belgium	Backyard Ultra World Team Championship
90 (WR)	Merijn Geerts (Belgium)	Keith Russell (Republic of Ireland)	14-May-2022	Rettert, Germany	

=== Milestone performances – Women ===
Milestone backyard ultra performances, including women's world records (WWR).

Yards "Loops"	Name	Runner up "Assist"	Date	Event/Place	Notes
95 (WWR)	Sarah Perry (United Kingdom)	Megan Eckert (USA) (92 yards)	21-Oct-2025	Tennessee	Backyard Ultra World Championship 2025
87 (WWR)	Megan Eckert (United States)	n/a	24-Oct-2024	Tennessee	Backyard Ultra World Team Championship
77	Megan Smyth (United States)	n/a	24-Apr-2026	Banana Slug Backyard Ultra, Oregon	
74 (WWR)	Jennifer Russo (United States)	n/a	30-May-2023	Capital Backyard Ultra in Lorton, VA	
68 (WWR)	Courtney Dauwalter (United States)	n/a	20-Oct-2020	Bigs Backyard Ultra, Tennessee, USA	
60	Maggie Guterl (United States)	n/a	22-Oct-2019	Bigs Backyard Ultra, Tennessee, USA	Female overall winner
67 (WWR)	Courtney Dauwalter (United States)	n/a	23-Oct-2018	Bigs Backyard Ultra, Tennessee, USA	
30	Katie Wright (New Zealand)	n/a	03-May-2019	Riverhead Backyard Relaps Ultramarathon, New Zealand	Female overall winner

=== Notable events ===
Significant and recurring Backyard Ultra races held around the world.

Event Name	Location	First held	Course record	Elevation (m)	Sources
Big Dog's Backyard Ultra	Bell Buckle, USA	2011	108	100	
Red On Backyard Ultra	Cheltenham, United Kingdom	2026	61	60	
Suffolk Backyard Ultra Festival	Suffolk, United Kingdom	2018	88	15	
Backyard Ultra World Team Championships	Global (simultaneous national events)	2020	124	Dependent on the local course	
Dead Cow Gully Backyard Ultra	Nanango, Australia	2020	119	14	
Herdy's Frontyard Ultra	Herdsman Lake, Australia	2021	57	48	
Legends Backyard Ultra	Retie, Belgium	2022	116	6	
Sydney's Backyard Ultra	St Ives, Australia	2023	81	35	
BPN Go One More Ultra	Liberty Hill, United States	2025	73	44	

== Scientific research ==
Backyard ultras have become the subject of scientific study in recent years. Their demanding nature in both intermittent high intensity exercise and sleep deprivation allows researchers to gain unique insights into cognitive performance under stress. In 2024 a study was published in PLOS One that examined participants in the Suffolk Backyard Ultra to investigate if the backyard ultra would impair cognitive performance and if this impairment could be mitigated by pre-race sleep patterns. Eleven males were tested during and after the event with the following: a 2 Choice Reaction Time test, a Stroop test, and a Tower Puzzle test. The study concluded that the environment of running a backyard ultra impairs cognitive function, however this impairment can be minimized with good sleep quality during the 7 days leading up to the event.

== See also ==
- Biotropika Ultra Trail
