= Biotropika Ultra Trail =

Ultramarathon in Russia

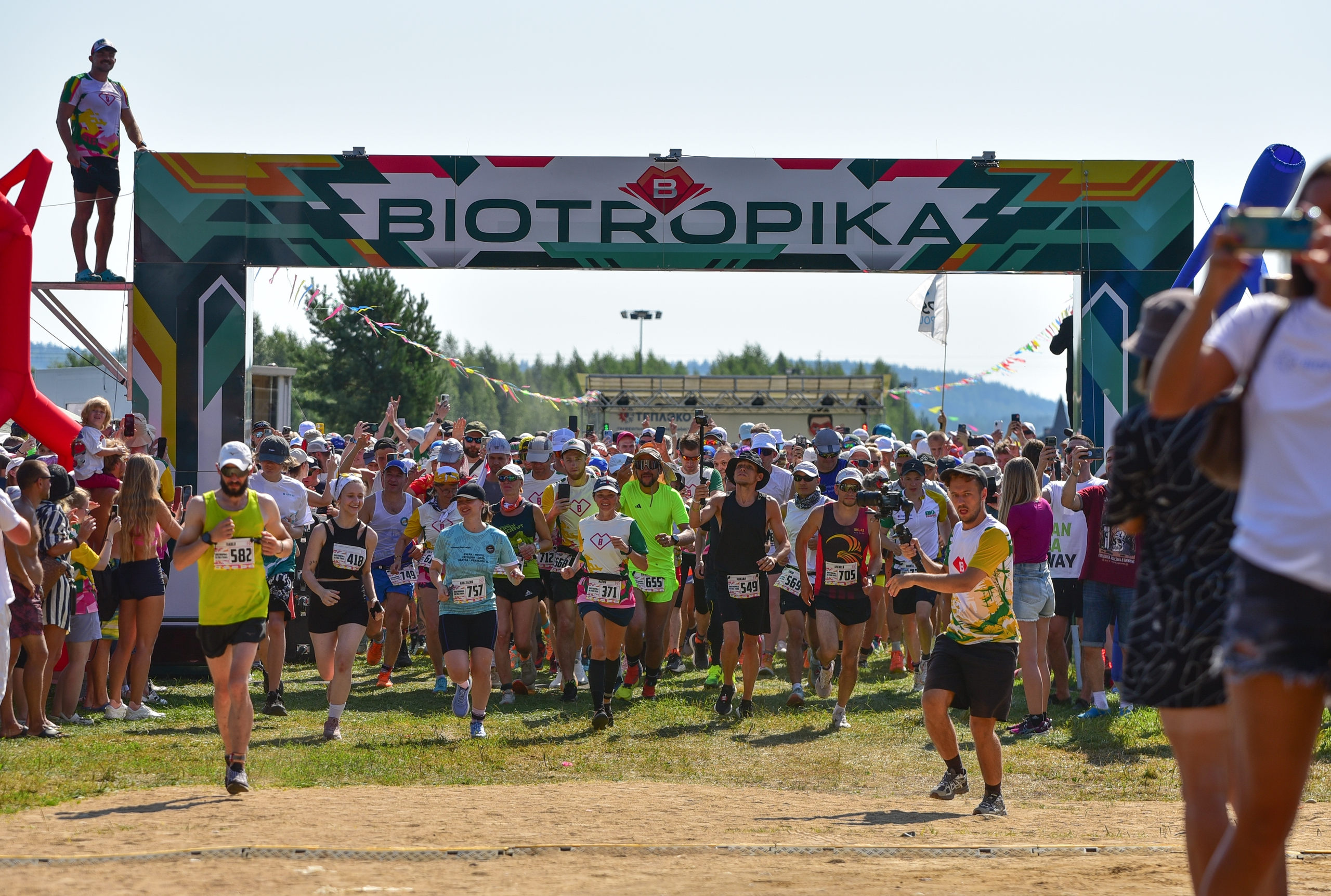
- Date: July
- Location: Russia, Leningrad Oblast, Korobitsyno
- Distance: Ultramarathon
- Primary sponsor: RosKedr
- Established: 2022
- Course records: Ivan Zaborsky (106 laps, 2025)
- Website: https://biotropikaultra.ru/

Biotropika Ultra Trail (BUT) is a Russian ultramarathon. It is part of the international Backyard ultra series.

== Description ==
The race was first held on July 30, 2022, in the village of Korobitsyno in Leningrad region, on the grounds of a ski resort. The organizer is Nikolay Kotenkov, who once set a world record for running a marathon backwards on a treadmill. He is also the founder of the “Sporting Entrepreneurs” club and the company RosKedr.

The rules of the race follow those established for the Backyard ultra series: participants run a lap of 6.7 km each hour; anyone who fails to complete the lap within one hour is DNF. A new start begins each hour until only one winner remains.

All participants who complete more than 30 laps earn the title BUTMAN and receive commemorative statuettes. Those who complete 60 laps become Grand Masters BUTMAN, those who complete 90 laps earn the title of Super BUTMAN.

== Results ==
=== BUT 2022 ===
The race from July 30 to August 1, 2022. The champion was Vasily Korytkin (Champion of Russia in 24-hour running (2021)). He completed 46 laps. Among women, the best result was by Irina Masanova, who ran 45 laps. Both of these became new Russian records in the Backyard Ultra format. A total of 148 athletes participated.

Top overall results:

1. Vasily Korytkin — 46 laps (308.476 km)
2. Irina Masanova — 45 laps (301.77 km)
3. Alexey Belousov — 38 laps (254.828 km).

=== BUT 2023 ===
The race started on July 29, 2023, with 213 participants at the start. The winner was again Vasily Korytkin, running 42 laps.

=== BUT 2024 ===
July 27, 2024, winner - Ildar Kamaletdinov, he completed 81 laps, setting a new Russian record.

=== BUT 2025 ===
On July 26, 2025, the fourth Biotropika Ultra Trail took place. A total of 560 participants started the race — the largest number in the backyard discipline to date. The winner and new Russian record holder was Ivan Zaborsky, who completed 106 laps.

=== BUT 2026 ===
On June 20, 2026, the fifth Biotropika Ultra Trail took place. The winner was Dmitriy Klimov, who completed 123 laps.

The next edition of Biotropika Ultra Trail is scheduled for June 26, 2027.
