= Lazarus Lake =

American endurance race designer

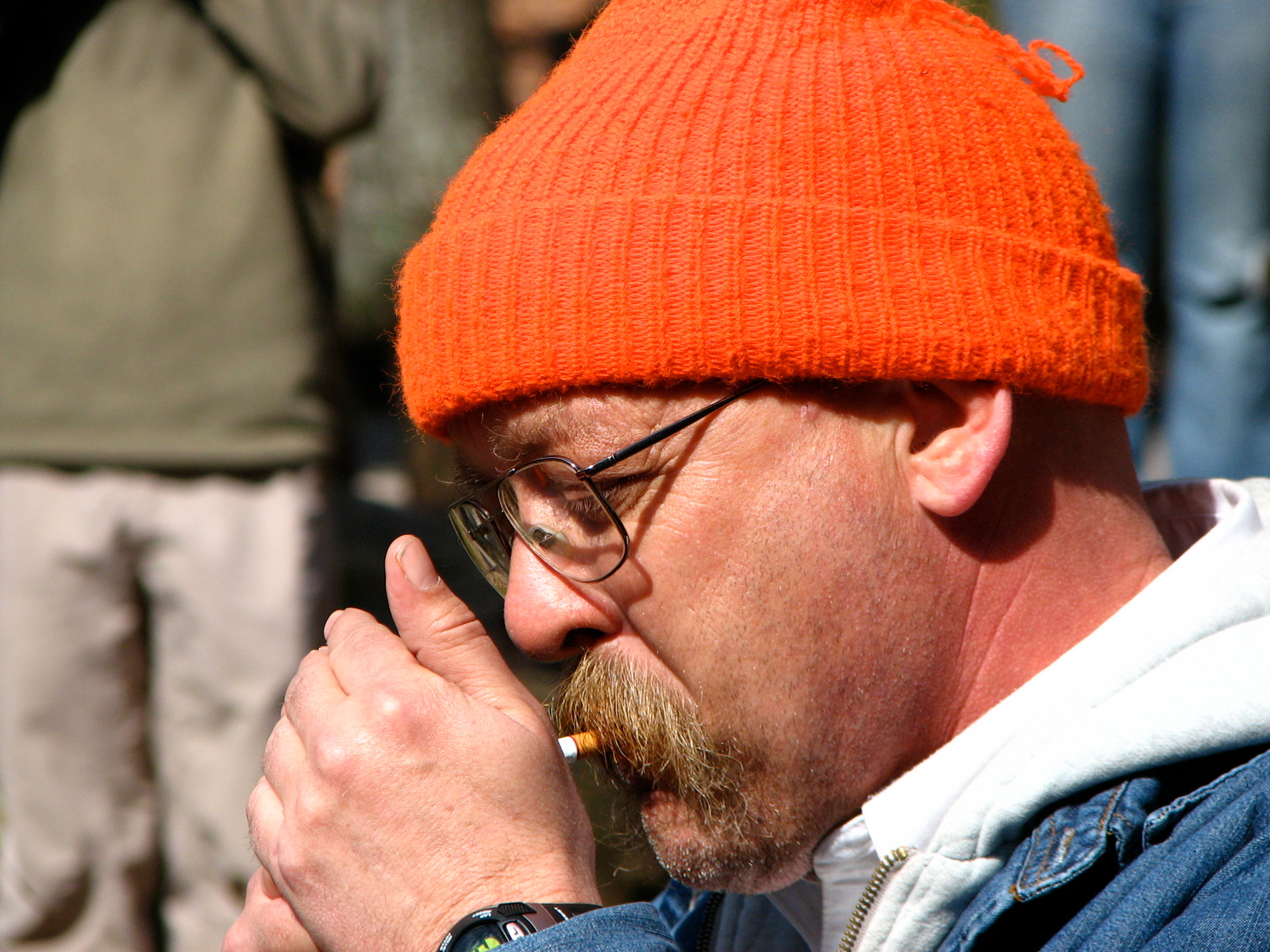
- Lake lighting a cigarette to signal the start of 2009 Barkley Marathons
- Born: Gary Cantrell
- Education: Middle Tennessee State University
- Occupations: Endurance race designer and director
- Spouse: Sandra Cantrell
- Children: 3

Gary Cantrell, known as Lazarus Lake, is an American endurance race designer and director. His races, including the Barkley Marathons, the Big's Backyard Ultra, the Last Annual Heart of the South, the Strolling Jim 40, and the Last Annual Vol State Road Race are known for their extreme challenge.

A largely fringe figure known only within the world of ultrarunning, Cantrell gained worldwide recognition following a 2014 documentary called The Barkley Marathons: The Race That Eats Its Young. Lake has developed a cult following.

== Career ==
In 1979, Lake organized his first ultramarathon, known as The Strolling Jim 40. The race was named after the first Tennessee Walking Horse to win best of his breed at the Tennessee Walking Horse National Celebration. The race is still held annually and is one of the oldest ultramarathons in the Southern United States.

In 1986, Lake created the Barkley Marathons, a 100 mile ultramarathon that has elements of orienteering and off-trail scrambling. The race has developed a reputation for its difficulty and is often referred to as "the race that eats its young". According to Lake, the Barkley Marathons are meant to test the limits of human endurance.

In 2012, Lake created the backyard ultra, where participants run a 4.167-mile (6.706 km) loop every hour, on the hour and are eliminated if they fail to complete the loop in time. The distance of each loop is equal to 100 miles divided by 24 hours, so that a competitor would run 100 miles for a full day of competition. The winner is the competitor who finishes one extra loop after all the other runners have dropped. The length of the event can range from 24 hours to four and a half days.

In 2020, Lake held the first Big Dog's Backyard Satellite Team Championship, where 25 countries competed against one another remotely from their respective homelands. Each team was allowed 15 runners and a team score would be the accumulation of the loops of each runner. By 2022, the number of countries participating had ballooned to 37 countries, which The New York Times called "an international battle royale", encompassing "qualifiers, hype videos and a livestream broadcast".

== Media appearances ==
Lake has appeared in several documentaries, including the 2014 The Barkley Marathons: The Race That Eats Its Young and 2017's Where Dreams Go To Die. In 2021, Lake appeared on episode 27 of Real Sports with Bryant Gumbel, where he was interviewed by Mary Carillo.

Lake has been featured in Sports Illustrated, The New York Times, and The Guardian.

Trail Runner Magazine called him an "evil genius", "The Leonardo da Vinci of pain", and "a master of sadomasochistic craft". The Bitter Southerner magazine described Cantrell as a "Bearded Saint" and "The Godfather of the Woods".

In 2025, journalist Jared Beasley published The Endurance Artist: Lazarus Lake, the Barkley & a Race with No End, a biography of Cantrell.

== Personal life ==
In 2018, Lake covered the United States on foot, starting in Rhode Island and ending in Oregon.

In 2023, Lake was inducted into the American Ultrarunning Hall of Fame. He lives with his wife Sandra in Bell Buckle, Tennessee.
