= Big's Backyard Ultra =

Ultramarathon in Bell Buckle, Tennessee

- Status: Active
- Genre: Trail racing
- Date: October
- Frequency: Annually
- Locations: Bell Buckle, Tennessee, U.S.
- Inaugurated: 2011
- Founder: Lazarus Lake

Big Dog's Backyard Ultra, often referred to as Big's Backyard Ultra, is the original backyard ultra, invented by Gary "Lazarus Lake" Cantrell of Bell Buckle, Tennessee. Participants run a 4.167-mile loop every hour, and are eliminated if they fail to complete a loop in an hour. The path of the loop is on trails during the day and along a road after dark. The distance of each loop is equal to 100 divided by 24, so that a competitor runs 100 miles for a full day of competition. There is no predefined finish. The winner is the competitor who completes a loop that no other competitors complete. If no competitor outlasts every other competitor, there is no winner.

== Past results ==
Year	Winner	Laps	Assist	Notes
2011	Tim Englund	18	Dave Carver	
2012	Joe Fejes	28	Marcy Beard	
2013	Tim Englund	35	Keith Knipling	
2014	(no winner)	49	Johan Steene / Jeremy Ebel	Both runners dropped out after 49 loops. (Note: When Steene dropped out to catch his flight back to Sweden, Ebel chose to drop out as well.)
2015	(race not held)			
2016	Babak Rastgoufard	29	Andy Pearson	
2017	Guillaume Calmettes	59	Harvey Lewis	
2018	Johan Steene	68	Courtney Dauwalter	
2019	Maggie Guterl	60	William Hayward	First female winner.
2020	Courtney Dauwalter	68	Harvey Lewis	U.S. winner. (Note: In 2020, the COVID-19 pandemic precluded international competitors from travelling to Tennessee, so the race was replaced by satellite events in various countries. The world title winner was Karel Sabbe in Belgium, with 76 laps.)
2021	Harvey Lewis	85	Chris Roberts	
2022	Piotr Chadovich	76	Harvey Lewis	
2023	Harvey Lewis	108	Ihor Verys	World record.
2024	Scott Snell	88	Megan Eckert	Female world record.
2025	Phil Gore	114	Ivo Steyaert	Female world record.

== See also ==
- Barkley Marathons
