= Teddy Keizer =

American mountain climber

Teddy Keizer, aka Cave Dog, is an Oregon record holder in the world of speed hiking/climbing. He is perhaps best known for his record time in completing the Colorado Mighty Mountain Megamarathon, which he did in 10 days, 20 hours, and 26 minutes in September 2000. After many failed attempts by others, his record was finally broken after 15 years by Andrew Hamilton. Keizer also has held speed records for the New York Adirondack 46 High Peaks, the New York Catskills 35, the New Hampshire White Mountain Four Thousand Footers and The Barkley. Keizer has appeared in national media outlets including the New York Times and the Outdoor Life Network.

== Background ==
Keizer grew up in Coos Bay, Oregon, USA. His family enjoyed outdoor adventures such as hiking and skiing. Keizer attended and graduated from Brown University with degrees in Political Science and Biology.

== Hiking and climbing speed records ==
After graduating from college, Keizer had the option of moving to Washington, D.C. to work as a staffer in Patrick Kennedy's office. However, friends convinced him that he needed more real world experience if he wanted to be an effective politician. Keizer spent the next several years traveling around the United States taking a variety of jobs so that he could better understand how people live. During his travels he moved to Crested Butte, Colorado to work at the Grand Butte Hotel as an accountant. Since he was only working a few hours each week, Keizer made a minimal amount of money and slept in snow caves to reduce his expenses. At that time, one of his good friends went by the name Scurvy Dog. Because of his connection to Scurvy Dog and habit of sleeping in snow caves, Keizer got the nickname Cave Dog, by which he is still commonly referred.

=== Mighty Mountain Megamarathon ===
While working at the Grand Butte, Keizer learned about Colorado's highest set of peaks that sit at or above 14,000 feet above sea level. These peaks are commonly referred to as '14ers. Keizer also learned about the Mighty Mountain Megamarathon, in which a climber attempts to summit all of the Colorado 14ers in the least amount of time. The Mighty Mountain Megamarathon requires climbers to summit each peak under his or her own power and also ensures a certain amount of vertical elevation is gained for each summit.

Keizer gained an interest in making an attempt to break the Mighty Mountain Megamarathon record and began planning and training for the race in 1998. During his preparations, Keizer consulted with well-known Colorado mountaineer Gerry Roach, who detailed commonly used routes others had used when attempting the record.

Keizer climbed extensively in preparation for his record attempt, summiting 14ers over 200 times before attempting the record in 2000. In addition to route planning and physical training, Keizer spent much of his effort laying out detailed driving directions to and from each trailhead. In early September 2000, Keizer, with the help of his team (known as the ‘Dog Team'), set out to break the Mighty Mountain Megamarathon record. During his record-breaking attempt, Keizer unintentionally fell asleep on the trail three times. Despite these minor setbacks, Keizer completed the Megamarathon and broke the record with a time of 10 days, 20 hours, and 26 minutes. Keizer's final peak during the record breaking run was Long's Peak, which is also the last time he ever summited a 14er.

=== Other hiking speed records ===
After breaking the Mighty Mountain Megamarathon record, Keizer attempted to break several other speed hiking records. He was able to achieve new speed records for the New York Adirondack 46 High Peaks, the New York Catskills 35 and the 48 New Hampshire White Mountain Four Thousand Footers. The New Hampshire White Mountain record was subsequently broken by Tim Seaver and the New York Catskill record was broken by Mike Siudy. Keizer also become only the fourth finisher ever of the gruelling Barkley Marathons in 2003 in what was a then record of 56 hours, 57 minutes, and 52 seconds. This record has since been beaten twice.

== Media and television appearances ==
Keizer's hiking accomplishments have led to appearances on television and in magazine and newspaper articles. Shortly after breaking the Mighty Mountain Megamarathon record Keizer was featured in a New York Times article. He also was featured on an Outdoor Life Network documentary in which he was challenged to do a 50 km hike in all 50 states in 100 days.

== Political career ==
Keizer's political aspirations date back to his time at Brown where he was elected student body president and worked on Patrick Kennedy's first congressional campaign. Keizer campaigns on a green platform. He unsuccessfully ran for the Oregon House of Representatives in 2014.
