= Stożek Wielki =

Mountain in Poland and the Czech Republic

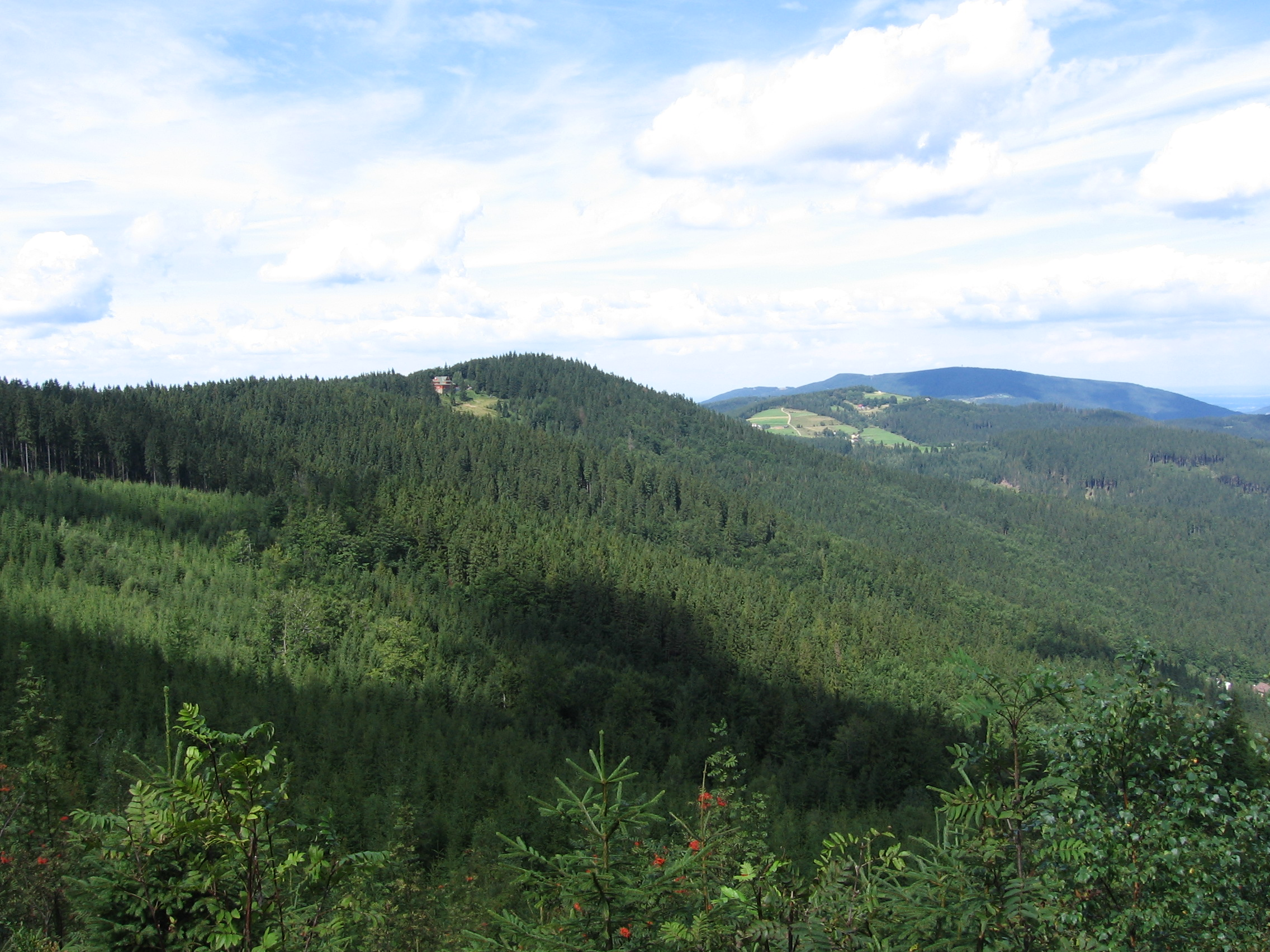
- Stożek Wielki

Highest point
- Elevation: 978 m (3,209 ft)
- Listing: Mountains of Poland
- Coordinates: 49°36′20″N 18°49′23″E

Geography
- Location within Poland Location within Czech Republic
- Location: Poland / Czech Republic
- Parent range: Silesian Beskids

Climbing
- Easiest route: Hike

Stożek Wielki (Czech: Velký Stožek; literally "big cone") is a mountain in the Silesian Beskids mountain range on the border of Poland and the Czech Republic . It reaches a height of 978 metres (3,209 ft).

The peak of the mountain has a characteristic conical shape and on its slopes grow beech and coniferous trees. It used to host a border crossing, which was eliminated in 2007 due to both countries entering the Schengen Area.

The mountain hut, located around 140 metres (460 ft) from the peak, was built from the initiative of Polskie Towarzystwo Turystyczne "Beskid" (Polish Touristic Society "Beskid"). It was opened on 9 July 1922, with over four thousand visitors, national and regional government representatives, and hiking clubs in attendance.

Stożek Wielki can be accessed by hiking trails from the nearby municipalities from both sides of the border. There is also a ski resort on the mountain, which skiers can reach using the chairlift.

Through a number of hiking routes it is possible to reach other summits such as Kubalonka, Czantoria Wielka, Soszów Wielki and towns, down into Wisła, Wisła-Głębce, Istebna, Jaworzynka and Jablunkov.

The Main Beskid Trail (Polish: Główny Szlak Beskidzki), the major long distance hiking trail in the region, also crosses the peak.

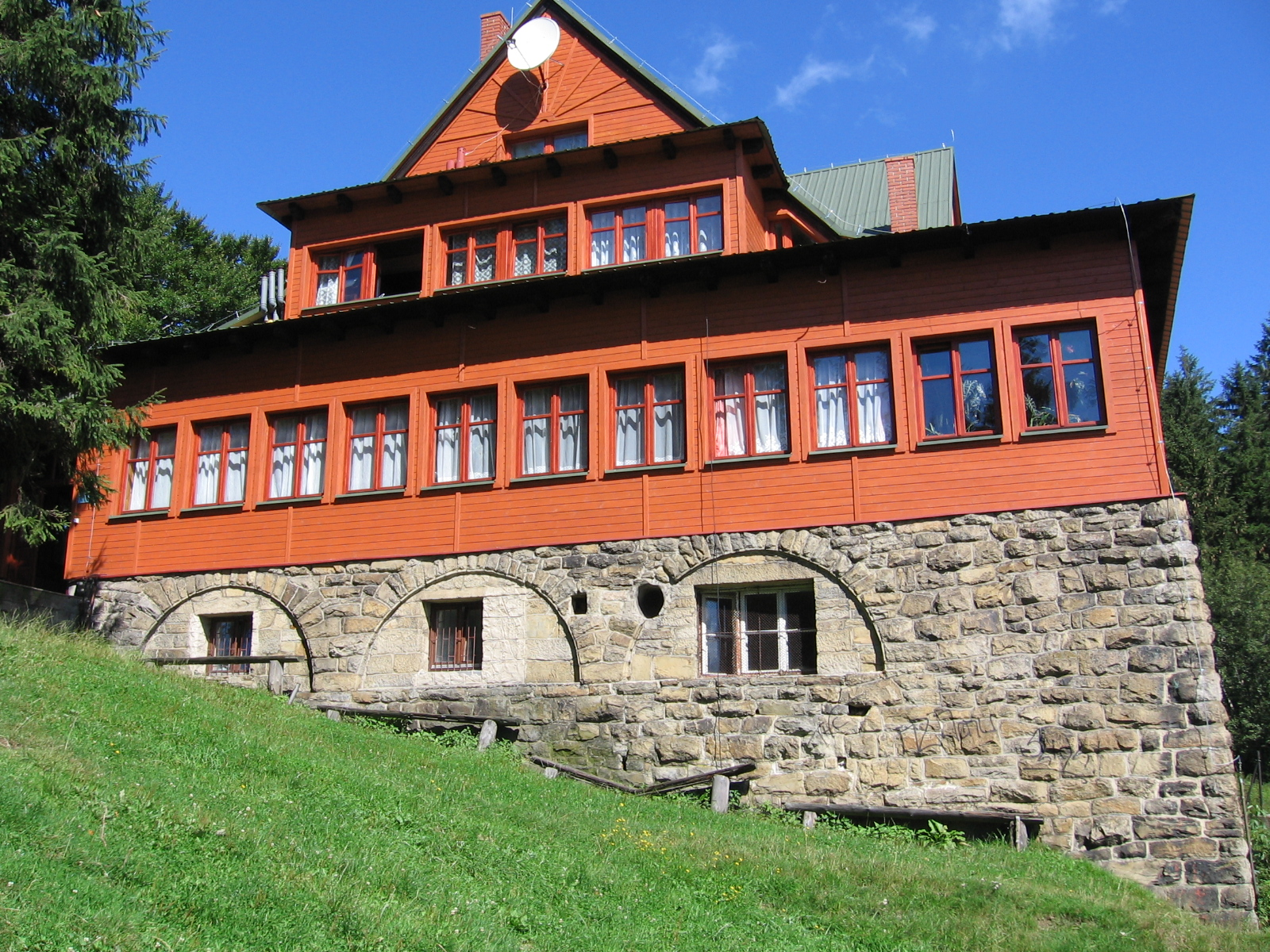
Mountain hut on Stożek

== See also ==
- Cieszyn Silesia
- Trans-Olza
