= Karel Sabbe =

Belgian ultrarunner

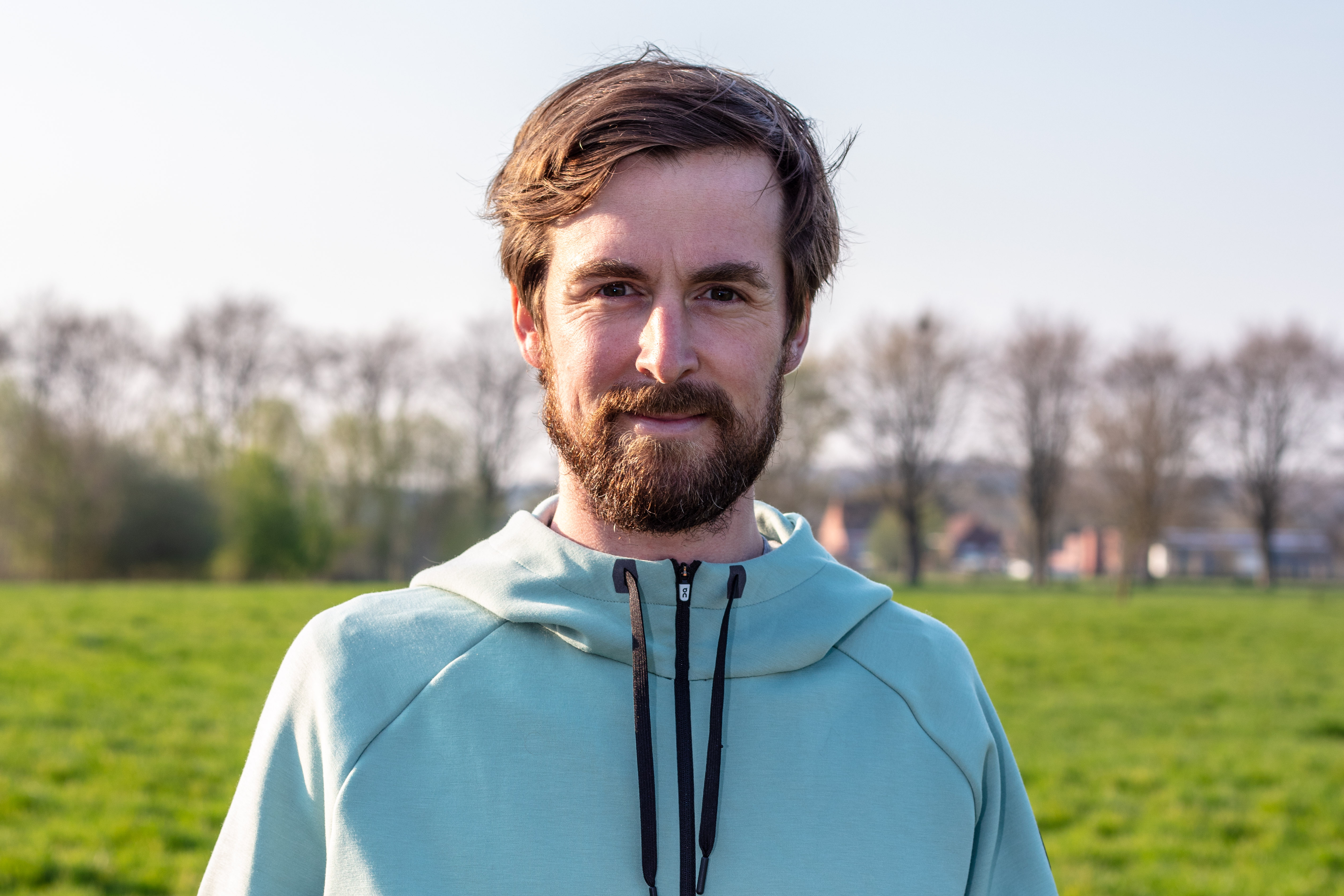
- Sabbe in his home town of Anzegem

Personal information
- Nationality: Belgian
- Born: 23 October 1989 (age 36) Waregem

Sport
- Country: Belgium
- Sport: Ultramarathons

Karel Sabbe (born in Waregem in 1989) is a Belgian dentist and ultrarunner. While Sabbe is not a professional athlete, he has repeatedly set several speed records on prominent trails and completed elite races such as Barkley Marathons.

== Life ==
Sabbe is a professional dentist. During his youth and student days, he mainly played football and tennis. In 2014 he ran his first marathon. Without any background in running he participated in the Coast to Coast-race in New Zealand consisting of a 36km trail run, 67km kayaking and 140km cycling.

This was followed by the Marathon des Sables (2016) in preparation for the Pacific Crest Trail (2016), where he finished 38th out of 1,200 starters. He eventually finished the 4,300km long Pacific Crest Trail in 52 days, dethroning world record holder Joe McConaughy. He also smashed the record on the Appalachian Trail (2018), which was also previously held by Joe McConaughy, by more than 4 days. It took him 41 days. For both records he is listed in the Guinness Book of Records.

In the summer of 2020 he became the record holder on the Alta Via 2 in the Italian Dolomites. In October he became world champion Big's Backyard Ultra in a new world record of 75 laps (502km in 75 hours).

During the summer of 2021 he set the new speed record on the Via Alpina, a long-distance hiking trail through the Alps. He completed the red trail, the longest of the network, in 30 days, 8 hours and 40 minutes.

In 2023, Sabbe became the 17th person to complete the Barkley Marathons.

During the Pacific Crest Trail, Appalachian Trail and the Barkley Marathons, he was logistically supported and guided by his brother-in-law and physiotherapist, Joren Biebuyck. During the Via Alpina record attempt, Biebuyck was joined by friends of Sabbe.

In the city of Ghent, a hill was named after him, the Karel Sabbeberg, after Sabbe climbed this hill a thousand times as part of his training.

In February 2025, Sabbe claimed the fastest known time for a supported run of Te Araroa, completing it in 31 days, 19 hours and 40 minutes, beating the previous record by over 17 days. During their traverse of New Zealand, Sabbe and his team were attacked by wild dogs, sustaining bite wounds and broken limbs.

In August 2026, he set a new world record, on the HexaTrek in France. The over 3,000 kilometres long route runs through the mountain ranges Vosges, Jura, Alps, Massif Central and Pyrenees, and has 140,000 altitude metres. Sabbe finished the HexaTrek in 33 days, 13 hours and 48 minutes, breaking the previous record of 42 days.

== Records ==
- 2016 — Fastest known time (FKT) on the Pacific Crest Trail
- 2018 — FKT on the Appalachian Trail northbound
- 2020 — World Champion Big's Backyard Ultra (in a new world record - 75 laps for a total of 502km)
- 2021 — FKT on the Via Alpina red trail
- 2023 — reclaimed the FKT on the Pacific Crest Trail
- 2025 — FKT on Te Araroa
- 2026 — FKT on the Hexatrek in 33 days, 13h and 48min.
