= Main Beskid Trail =

Hiking trail in Poland

Kazimierz Sosnowski Main Beskid Trail
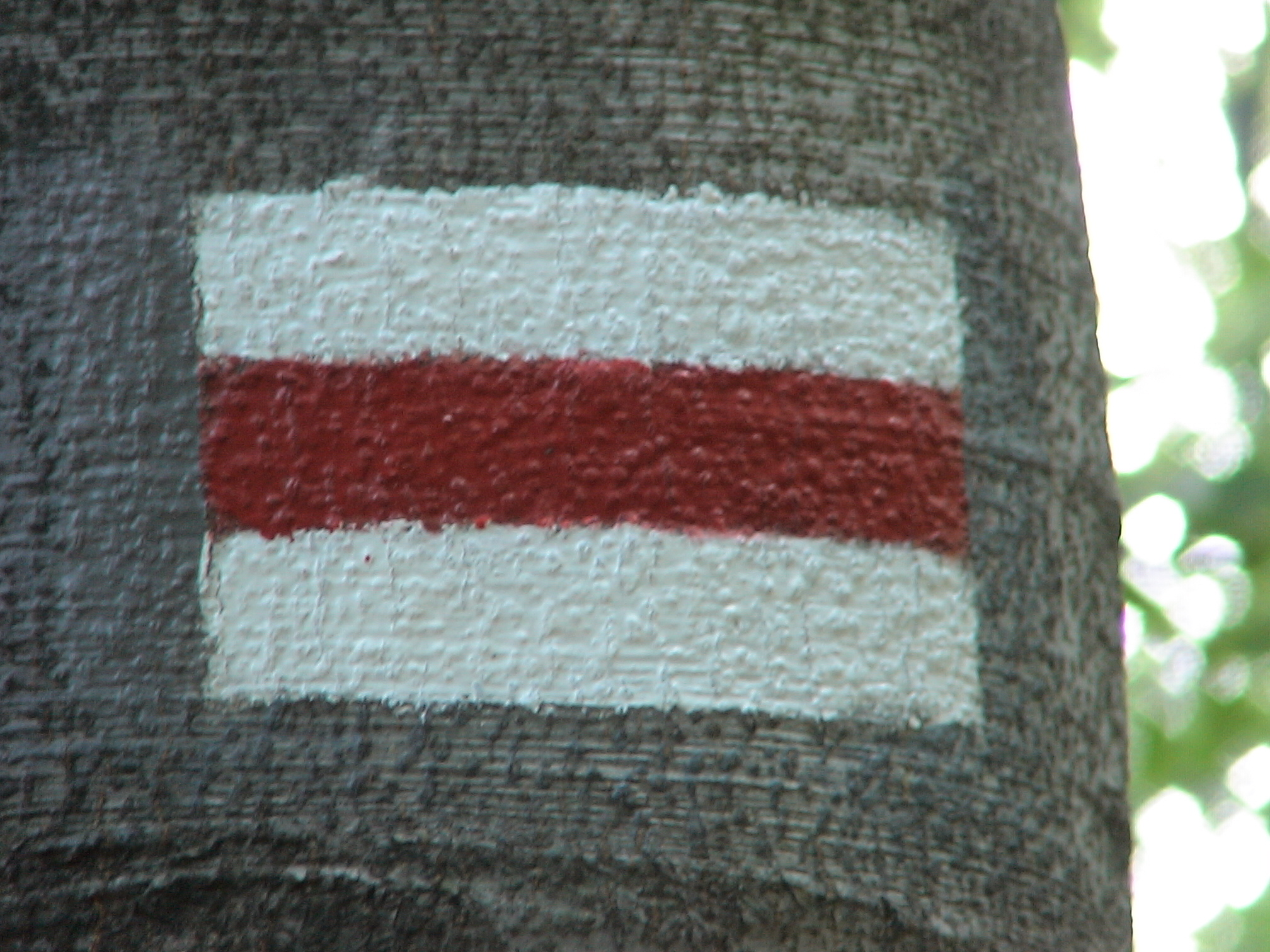
- Trail blazing
- Length: 496 km (308 mi)
- Location: Beskids, Poland
- Trailheads: Ustroń 49.716667°N 18.816667°E; Wołosate 49.067222°N 22.679722°E
- Use: Hiking
- Highest point: 1,725 metres (5,659 ft)
- Season: All year

Trail map
- Main Beskid Trail

The Kazmierz Sosnowski Main Beskid Trail (Polish Główny Szlak Beskidzki imienia Kazmierza Sosnowskiego, "GSB") is a long-distance trail marked in red that leads from Ustroń in the Silesian Beskids to Wołosate in the Bieszczady Mountains.

At about 496 kilometres (308 mi), it is the longest trail in the Polish mountains. It crosses the Silesian Beskid, the Żywiec Beskid (Beskid Żywiecki), the Gorce Mountains, Beskid Sądecki, the Low Beskids (Beskid Niski) and the Bieszczady Mountains. Covering the highest parts of the Polish Beskids, it crosses peaks such as Stożek Wielki (Velký Stožek in Czech ), Barania Góra, Babia Góra, Polica, Turbacz, Lubań, Przehyba, Radziejowa, Jaworzyna Krynicka, Rotunda, Cergowa, Chryszczata, Smerek and Halicz as well as towns such as Ustroń, Węgierska Górka, Jordanów, Rabka-Zdrój, Krościenko nad Dunajcem, Rytro, Krynica-Zdrój, Iwonicz-Zdrój, Rymanów-Zdrój, Komańcza, Cisna and Ustrzyki Górne.

The trail was created during the interwar period. The route of the western part (Ustroń-Krynica) was designed by Kazimierz Sosnowski and it was finished in 1929. The eastern was designed by Mieczysław Orłowicz. It was completed 1935 and it led to Chornohora which, at the time, was located within the borders of Poland. Between 1935 and 1939, the trail was named after Józef Piłsudski.

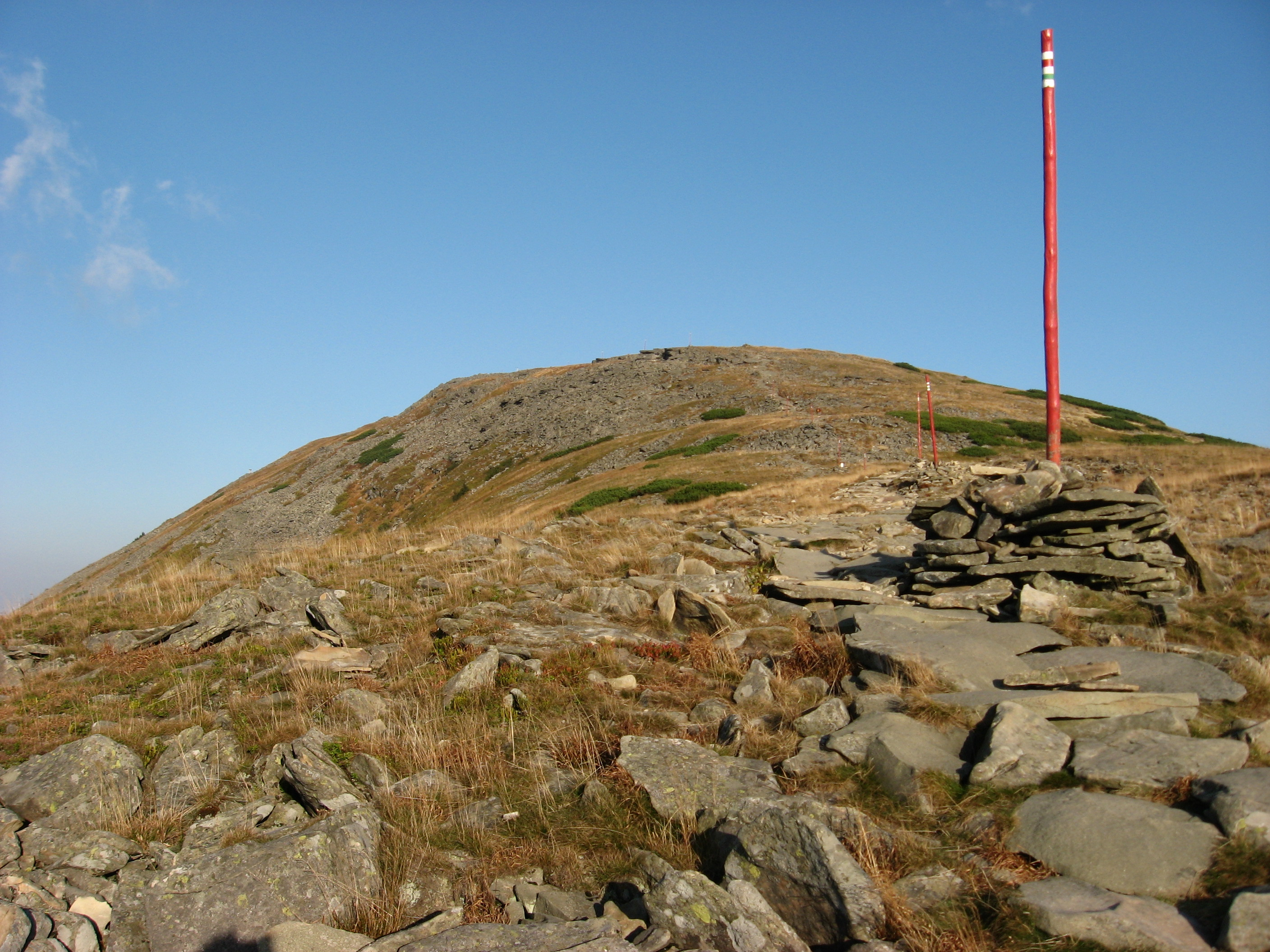
The summit of Babia Góra (1725 m, the highest point of the trail)

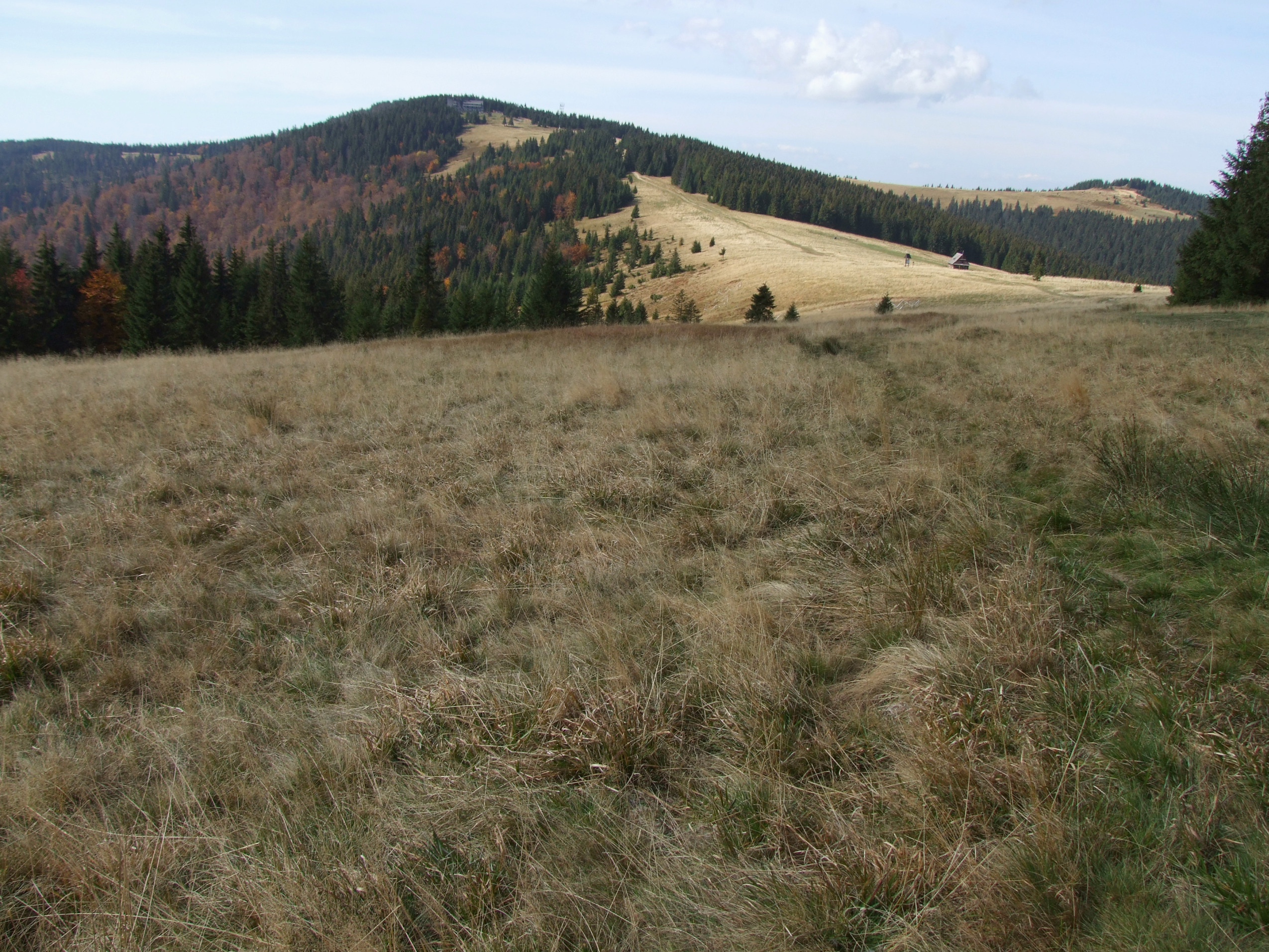
Turbacz and Hala Długa ("the long alp")

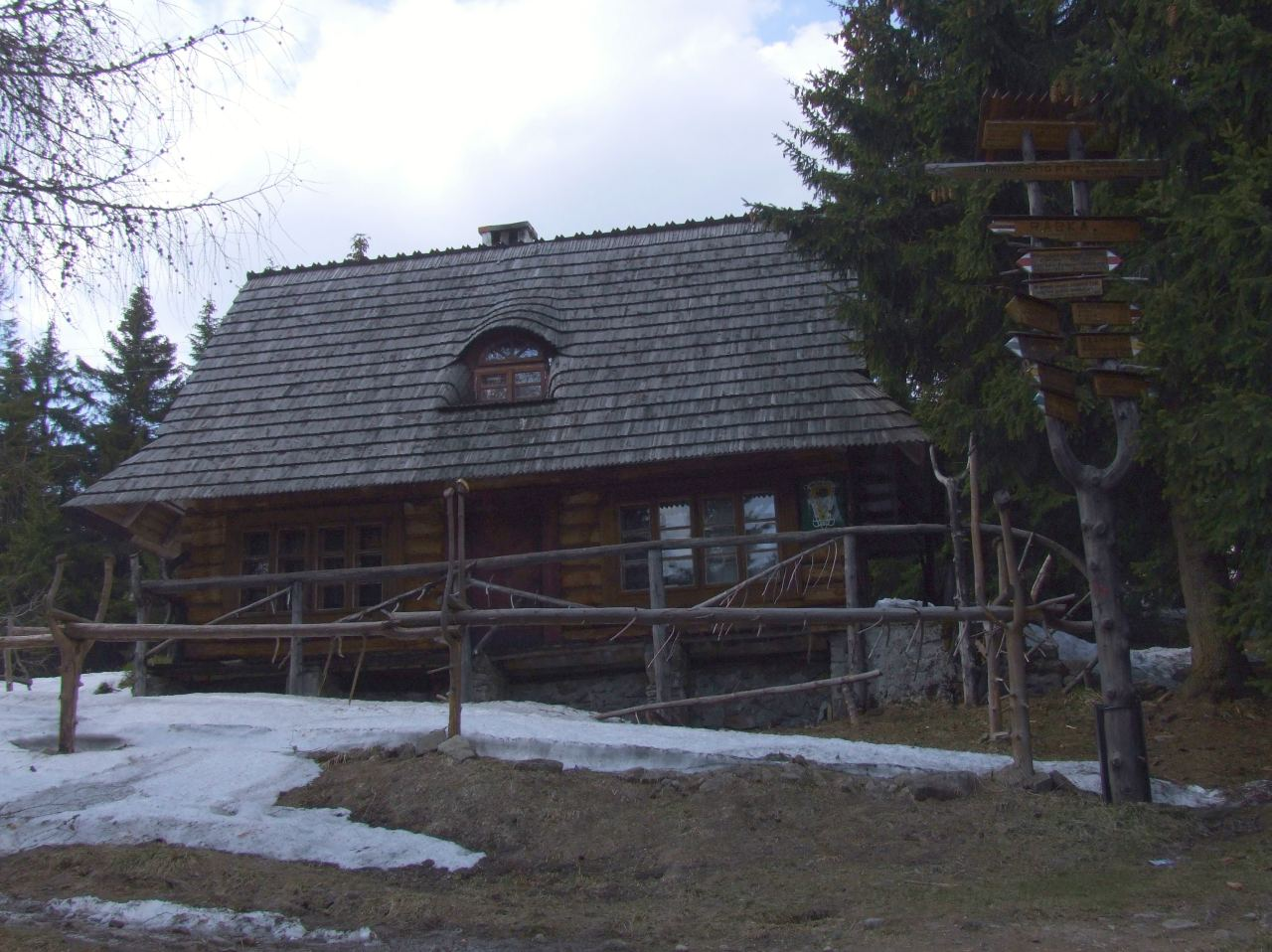
The building of PTTK (Polish Tourist Association) on Turbacz (the Gorce Mountains)

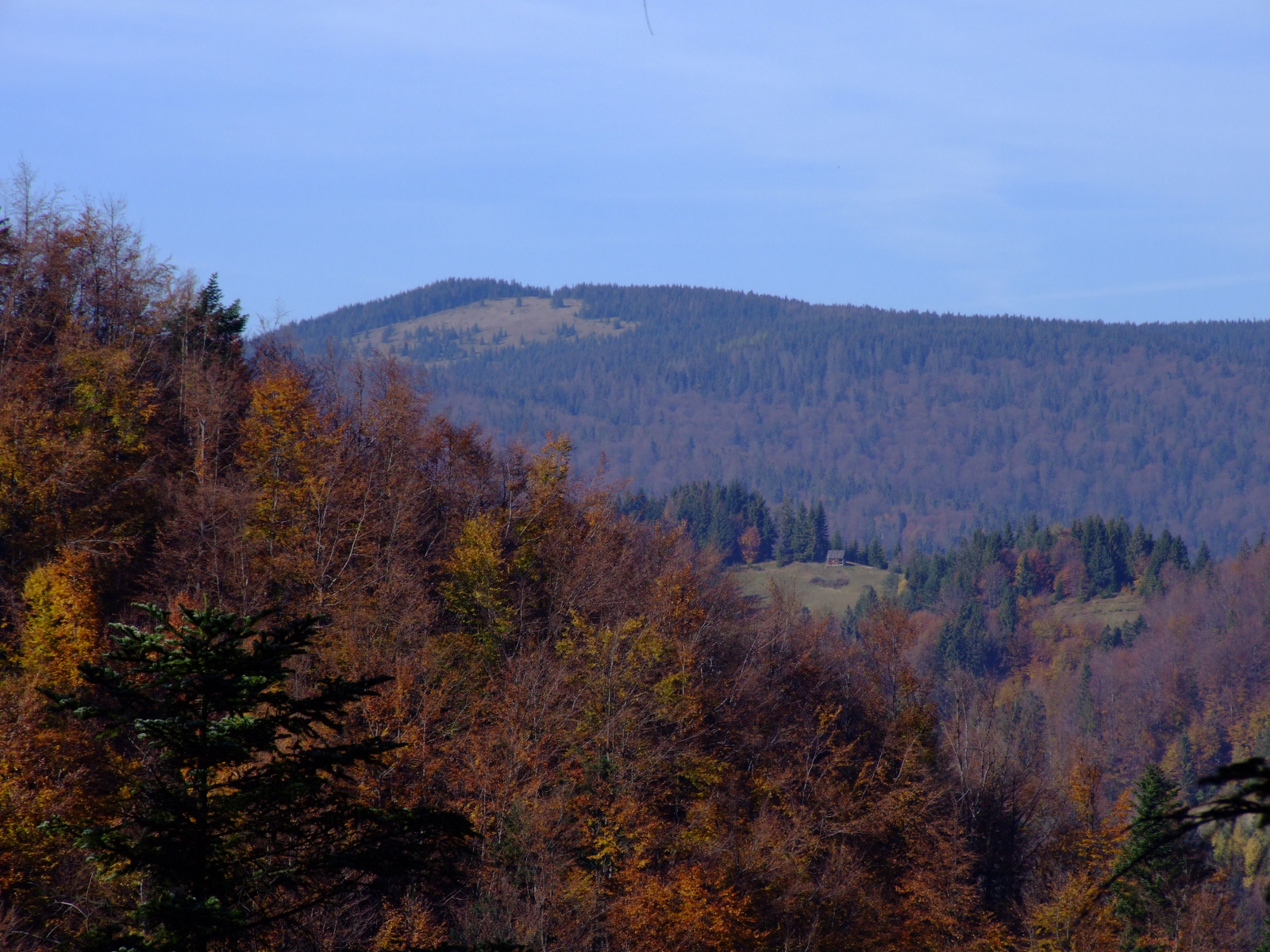
View of Kiczora from the ridge of Lubań

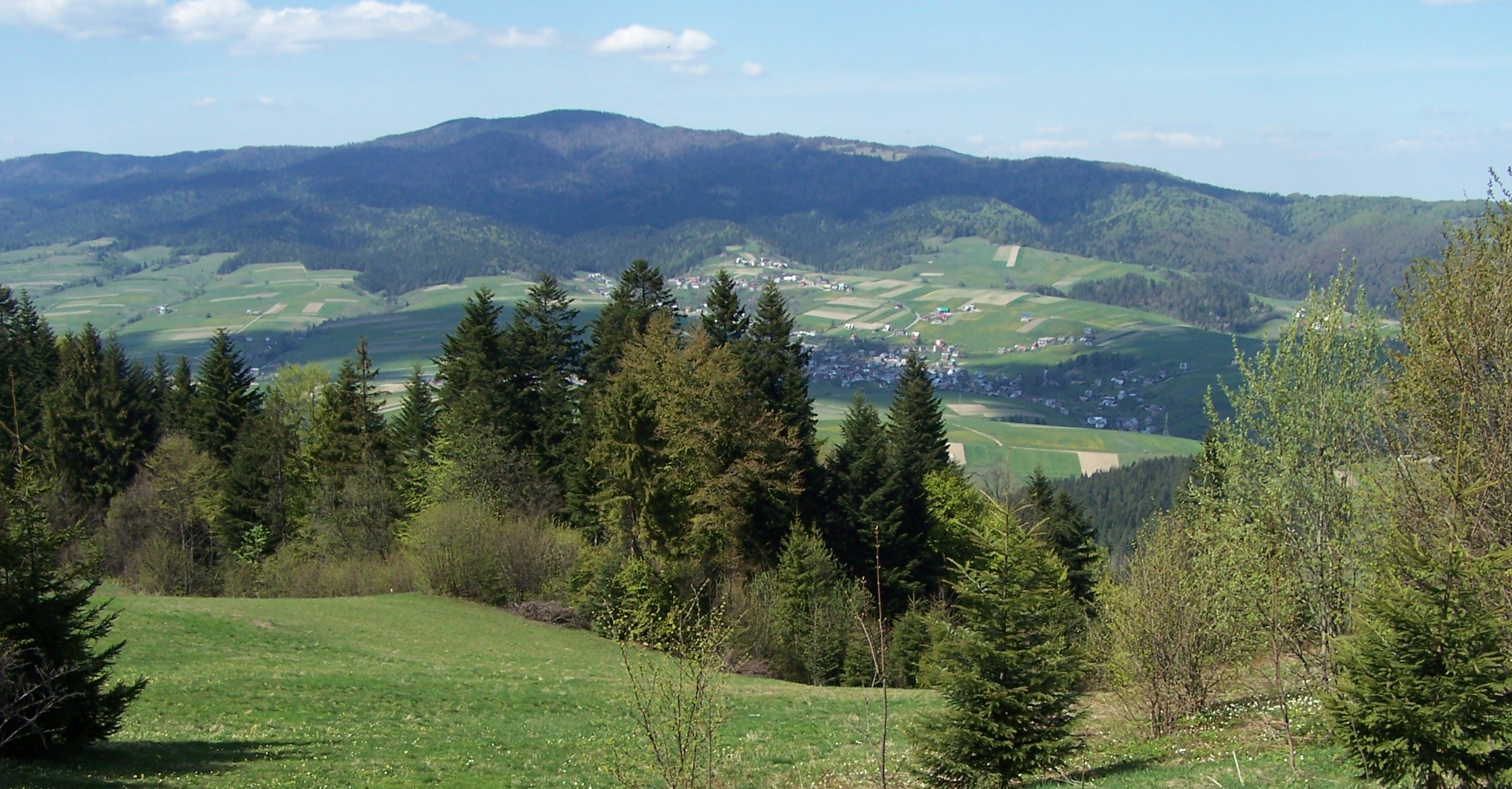
Ridge of lubań seen from the Pieniny Mountains

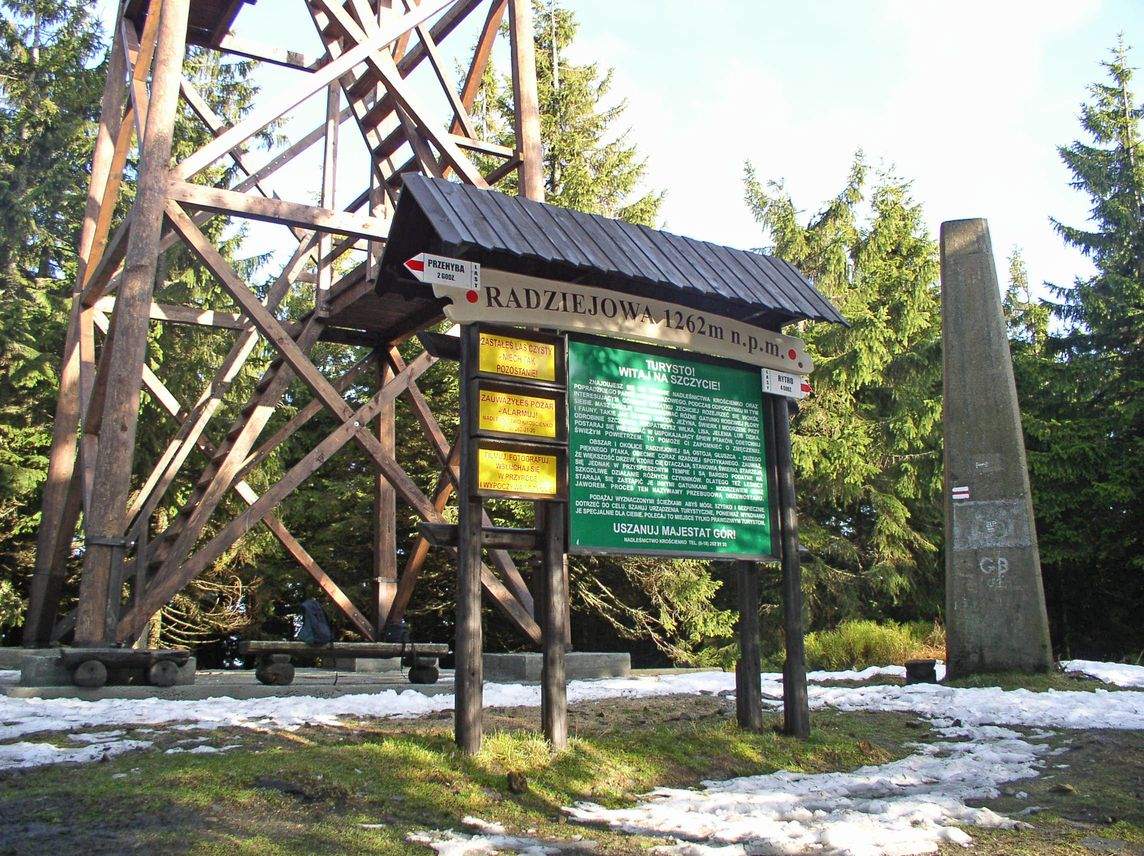
The summit of Radziejowa

== Records ==
Many Polish ultrarunners have attempted to set new records on the trail. The current fastest known time on the trail belongs to Kamil Leśniak, who covered the trail in 93 hours, 42 minutes, and 22 seconds, beating the prior record by just under two minutes. This was a supported run, which means that the athlete could work with an external support team.

== See also ==
- the Mieczysław Orłowicz Main Sudetes Trail from Świeradów Zdrój to Prudnik.
