= Harvey Lewis (ultrarunner) =

American ultrarunner

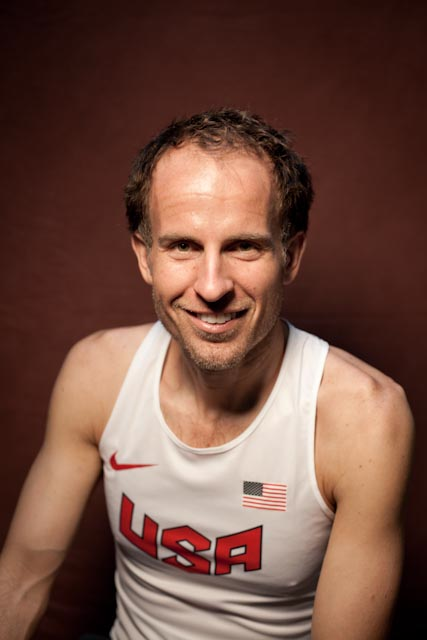

Personal information
- Born: April 13, 1976 (age 49) Wheeling, West Virginia
- Height: 6 ft (1.8 m)
- Weight: 169 lb (77 kg)

Sport
- Country: United States
- Event: Ultramarathon

Harvey Lewis (born April 13, 1976) is an American ultrarunner.

== Early and personal life ==
Lewis was born in Wheeling, West Virginia and spent much of his childhood in Berea, Ohio. He is a high school teacher and has lived in Cincinnati, Ohio.

Lewis is a vegan. He believes that his plant-based diet contributes significantly to his endurance and recovery as an ultramarathon runner.

== Running career ==
Lewis represented Team USA at the International Association of Ultrarunners (IAU) 24 Hour World Championship in 2012, 2013, 2014, and 2017.

In July 2014, Lewis won the Badwater Ultramarathon in just under 23 hours and 53 minutes. In the same year, he tied for second place at the Arrowhead 135. In October 2023, Harvey broke the Backyard Ultra record by completing 108 laps (450 miles) over five days of running.

== Race results ==
=== Winner ===
Winner, Big Dog's Backyard Ultra (354.16 miles) October 2021

Winner, Badwater Ultramarathon (135 miles) 23:52:55 July 2014

Winner, SC24, Spartanburg, SC, March 16, 2014: 154.590 miles

=== Course records ===
Backyard Ultra, World Record of 108 laps completed (450 miles) over 5 days, October 2023

== Activism ==
In 2008, Lewis earned a grant to retrace the steps of Mahatma Gandhi's famous 1930 Salt March, a nonviolent protest to the salt tax. Gandhi and his followers walked 241 miles from his home (Harijan Ashram) to the coastal city of Dandi. In 2009, Lewis retraced Dr. Martin Luther King Jr.'s Selma to Montgomery march. Lewis also met with the 99-year-old Amelia Boynton Robinson after his run, who told Lewis "I believe God kept me alive 99 years so I can share my story with young people".
