= Barkley Marathons =

Ultramarathon trail race in Tennessee

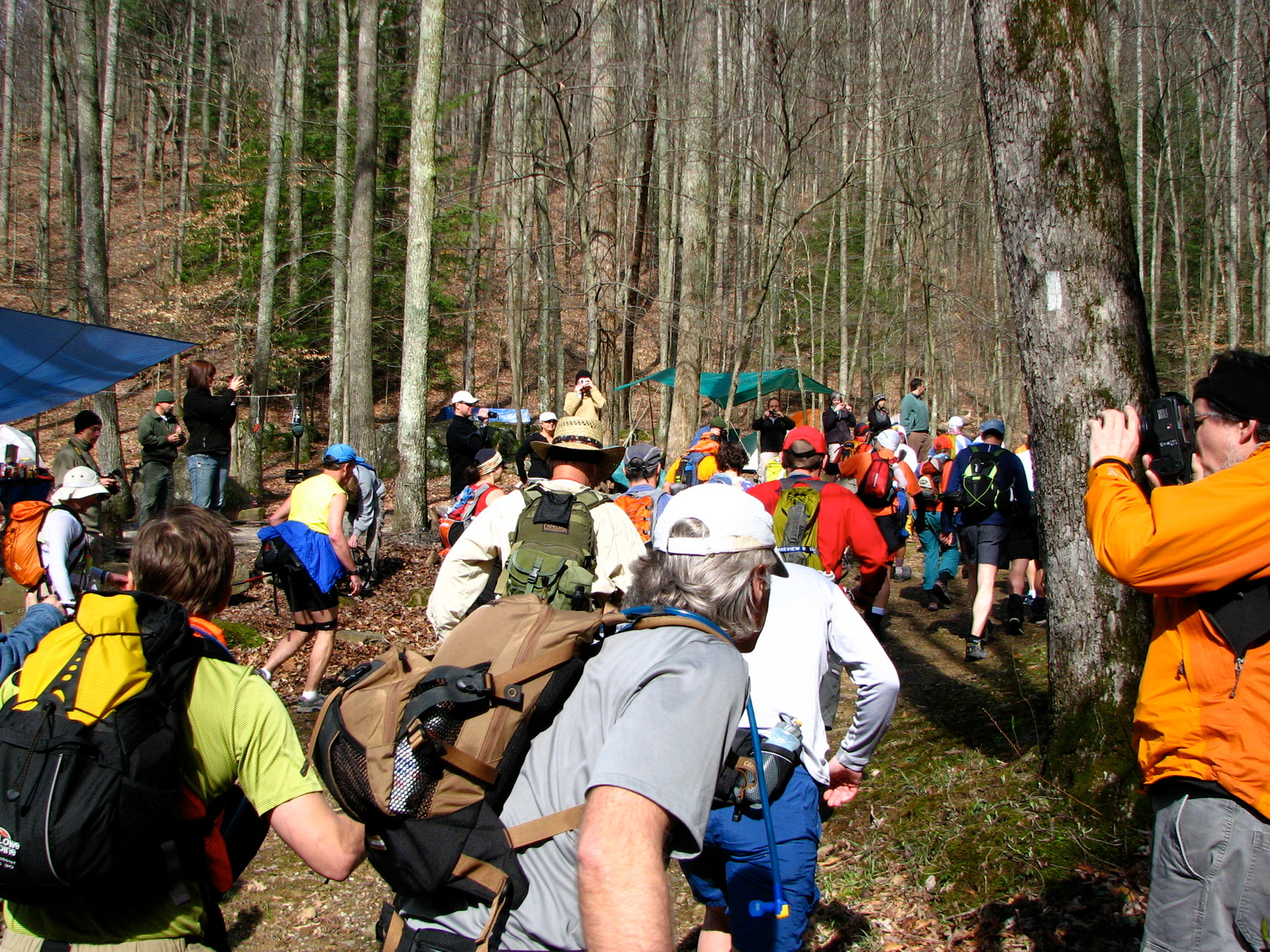
- The start of the 2009 Barkley Marathons
- Date: Varies; usually near April Fools' Day
- Location: Frozen Head State Park, Tennessee, U.S. 36.126°N 84.501°W
- Event type: Trail racing
- Distance: 100 miles (160 km) (5 laps of 20 miles (32 km))
- Established: 1986
- Organizer: Gary "Lazarus Lake" Cantrell
- Course records: Men: 52:03:08, Brett Maune (2012); Women: 59:58:21, Jasmin Paris (2024)
- Participants: 40

The Barkley Marathons is an ultramarathon trail race held each year in Frozen Head State Park in Morgan County, Tennessee, United States. Described as "The Race That Eats Its Young", it is known for its extreme difficulty, purposefully difficult application process, and many strange traditions, having been completed only 26 times by 20 runners since 1995.

The course, which varies from year to year, consists of five loops of 20 miles (32 km) of off-trail course for a total of 100 miles (160 km) of harsh terrain. The race is limited to a 60-hour period from the start of the first loop, and takes place usually between mid-March and early April each year, though the actual start date and time is a closely held secret until shortly before the race begins. A "fun run" ultramarathon, which consists of three of the loops for a total of 60 miles, can be run within the larger race.

== History ==
=== 1985–1994: Creation, first races and initial changes ===
The Barkley course was the brainchild of Gary "Lazarus Lake" Cantrell and Karl "Raw Dog" Henn, who often hiked Frozen Head together. The idea for the race was inspired by the 1977 escape of James Earl Ray, who was convicted for the assassination of Martin Luther King Jr., from nearby Brushy Mountain State Penitentiary. Ray covered only about 8 miles (13 km) after escaping for 54 hours. Mocking Ray's low mileage, Cantrell said to himself, "I could do at least 100 miles". Thus, the Barkley Marathons were born. Cantrell named the race for his longtime neighbor and running companion, Barry Barkley. Barkley died in 2019 at age 70.

The race was first run in 1986. For the early years, the Barkley course was approximately 50–55 miles (80–89 km), with about 25,000–27,000 feet (7,600–8,200 m) of climbing, in a 24-hour time limit. No runners came close to finishing, which Cantrell called "a rousing success all around." In 1988, "Frozen" Ed Furtaw, from North Carolina, became the first to finish the original short version of the course with a time of 32:14. In 1989, the course was extended. The 55-mile (89 km) version was referred to as “the short one” and the 100-mile (160 km) version, “the long one.”

=== 1995–present: Current iteration ===
In 1995, the race's current 20-mile lap system was introduced, and the cut-off was extended to 60 hours, its current form. That year, Mark Williams of the United Kingdom became the first participant to finish the full longer version of the Barkley Marathons with a time of 59:28:48.

No race took place in 2002, due to the temporary closure of Frozen Head State Park. In 2009, Brushy Mountain State Penitentiary closed, allowing it to eventually become part of the Barkley course including a tunnel under the prison and a pass by the wall through which Ray escaped. By 2013, nearly 800 runners had competed in the race, with only twelve people finishing that version of the race. In 2017, Gary Robbins of North Vancouver, British Columbia, reached the finishing gate a mere six seconds after the 60-hour cut-off, almost becoming the 16th runner ever to complete the Barkley. However, he had taken a wrong turn in the final stages of the race, thus cutting two miles off the course; he would have been disqualified even if he had been faster. "The time, in that situation, is meaningless," Cantrell said of the six-second time overage.

In 2013, the application for the Barkley had taunted that women were "too soft" to complete the race. In 2023, British runner Jasmin Paris became the fourth woman to complete the 3 loop 'Fun Run' and only the second to start the 4th loop. Sue Johnston previously started the fourth loop in 2001. Previous women to have completed the 3-loop 'Fun Run' are Suzi Thibeault (1991, 1994), Nancy Hamilton (1991, 1993), Sue Johnston (2000, 2001) and Beverley Anderson-Abbs (2012, 2013). They have all completed the 3 loop 'Fun Run' twice. In 2024, Paris became the first woman to complete all five loops within the time limit, finishing the event 99 seconds before the 60-hour cut-off.

The 2020 event was cancelled due to the COVID-19 pandemic.

== Race description ==
=== Registration ===
The Barkley is limited to 35 to 40 runners, largely due to restrictions by Tennessee park officials. Registration and application for the race is purposefully difficult; Cantrell has stated that "anything that makes it more mentally stressful for the runners is good." Requirements and times to submit an entry application are a closely guarded secret with no details advertised publicly and no official website.

Potential entrants must send an email to the correct address at the correct time, and pay a $1.60 application fee, representing one penny per mile for both the 60-mile and 100-mile races. Additionally, an entry form must also be completed which includes bizarre and irrelevant questions. These have included questions such as "What is the most important vegetable group?", "What will be the 119th element on the periodic table?", and "Write the Gettysburg Address in Sawveh." This is followed by a written essay on "Why I Should be Allowed to Run in the Barkley." Only after this are 40 runners accepted and given the date of the race.

If accepted, an entrant receives a "letter of condolence" from Cantrell's pseudonym Lazarus Lake which warns them that they have a "very bad thing waiting." Cantrell also picks at least one "sacrificial virgin," or "human sacrifice," who, based on their answers in the essay and test, he believes has no chance of finishing the race. He has stated that this pick is always an accomplished runner, and that he only picks them if they do not want to be the "human sacrifice".

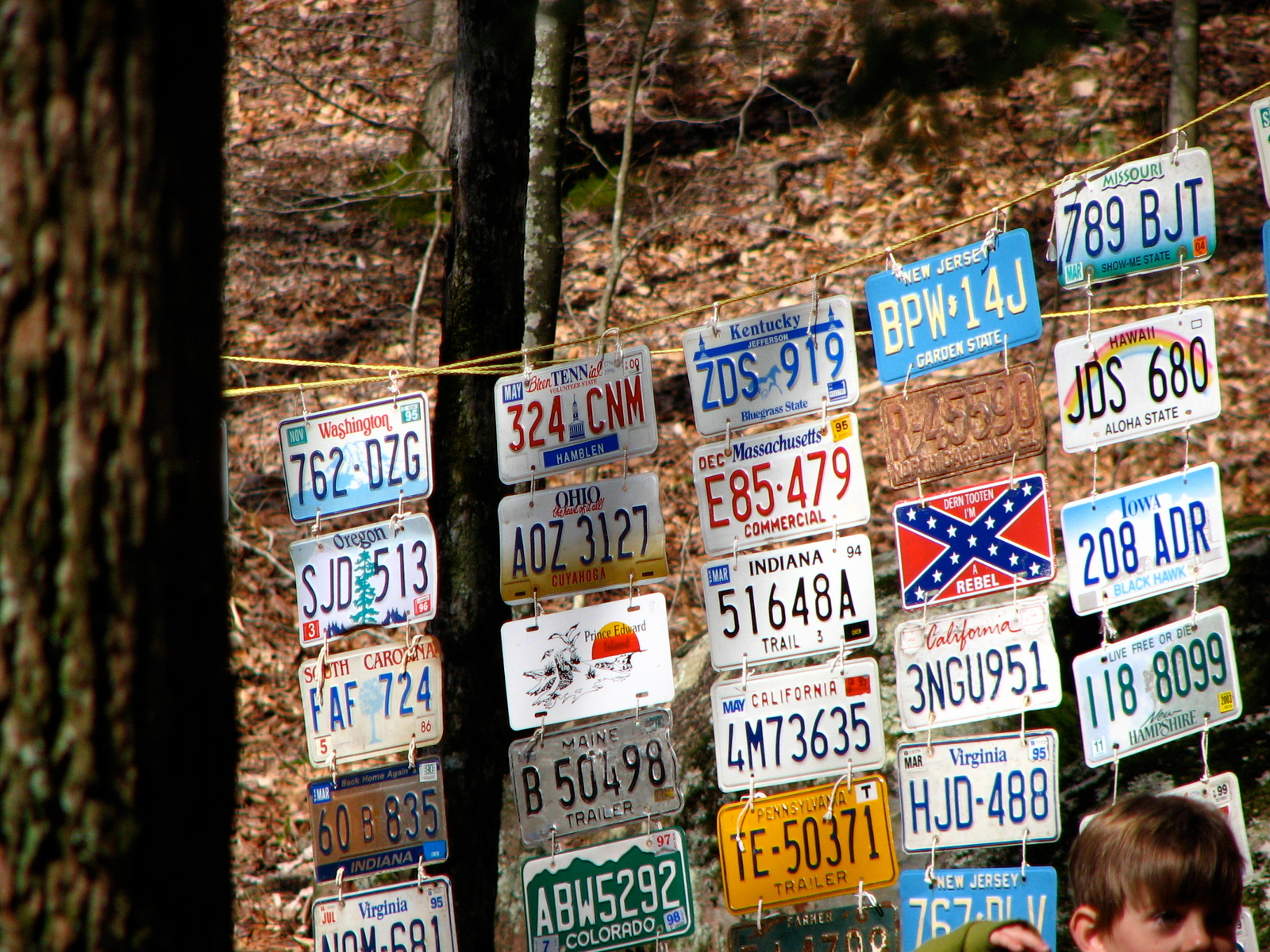
License plates at the 2009 Barkley Marathons, including a since-removed one with the confederate battle flag

Upon arriving, first-time Barkley runners, known as virgins, are required to bring a license plate from their state or country as part of the entrance fee, which are hung from the trees each year as mementos. This has led to some controversy due to the inclusion of the confederate flag on one of the plates, which was subsequently taken down. Previous racers are required to bring an item of clothing which in the past has included things such as a white shirt, socks, and a size 18 flannel shirt, as a donation for being a non-finisher. These clothing donations are apparently based on the current needs of Cantrell at the time. Prior finishers of the marathon who return to run again must submit a pack of Camel cigarettes as part of the registration fee.

=== Course ===
The course itself has changed distance, route, and elevation many times since its inaugural run; Cantrell modifies it to ensure it remains "at the very horizon of human potential", making it more difficult each time someone finishes. It currently consists of an unmarked loop, which must be navigated twice clockwise, twice counter clockwise, and once in a direction determined by the leading runner. As the course has changed over the years the length of the loop has increased with the current estimate being around 25 miles (40 km) per loop while "officially" the loop is still stated to be 20 miles (32 km). Within the loop are various landmarks that are comically named, including the names "Checkmate Hill," "Hillpocolypse," "Little Hell," "Meatgrinder," "Rat Jaw," and "Testicle Spectacle." The loop begins and ends at a yellow road gate. There are no aid stations, except water in two places.

Runners of the 100-mile version run this loop five times, taking a counterclockwise direction for loops two and four, followed by each runner alternating direction on loop five, after the first-placed runner's choice. Runners who complete three circuits of the loop (60 miles) are said to have completed a "fun run". The loop is estimated to be as long as 26 miles (42 km), yielding 130 miles (210 km) for the full race and 78 miles (126 km) for the "fun run."

A course map and a set of printed directions are available before the race begins, which runners must study and copy onto their own maps prior to the race, navigating by their own notes alone once the race begins. This has led to runners getting lost; in 2006, a 75-year-old runner became lost for 32 hours after covering just two miles of the course, eventually entering a different county.

=== Timing and other requirements ===
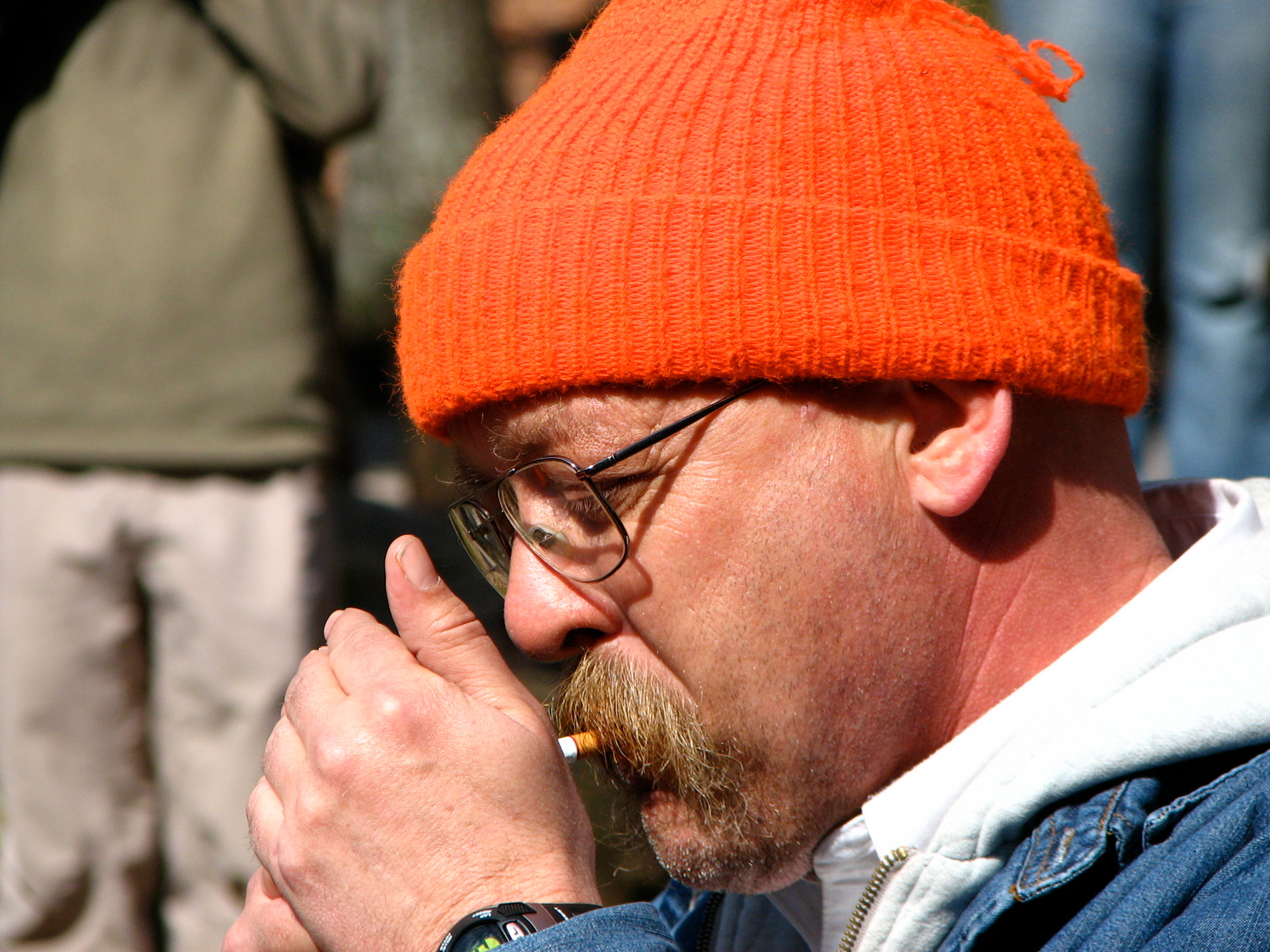
Cantrell lights a cigarette to signal the start of the Barkley Marathons in 2009.

The Barkley starts any time from 11 p.m. to 11 a.m. on the first day of the race. Traditionally the date of the race is a closely guarded secret, taking place anytime between mid-March and early April; the earliest the race has been held is the 2026 edition, which was started on February 14th at 6 am local time, the first time the event has started in February. A one-hour countdown to the start of the race is signaled by blowing a conch, and the race officially begins when Cantrell lights a cigarette.

In addition to running, competitors must find between 9 and 15 books along the course (the exact number varies each year) and remove the page corresponding to the runner's race number from each book as proof of completion. Because of this, competitors are only issued odd numbers. Competitors get a new race number, and thus a new page requirement, at the start of each lap. The books' titles often contain themes of death and darkness, such as Death Walks the Woods, Heart of Darkness, and A Time to Die in 2013. If a page is lost, the runner is disqualified. By 2023, Cantrell, due to ailing health, was placing only one of the 13 books for the event, having placed all of the books around the course in years prior. A day hiker removed one of the books that year, causing some confusion.

The cut-off time for the 100-mile race is 60 hours overall, or an average of 12 hours per loop, and the cut-off for the 60-mile version of the race is 40 hours overall, which averages out to 13 hours and 20 minutes per loop. This also includes any rest/food time between loops. Once a competitor has started a loop (noted by the time they touch the yellow gate after collecting their bib) they are not allowed to receive any assistance, other than from fellow runners, until they have finished that loop. However, in 2006, nobody finished even the 60-mile "fun run" in under 60 hours. Prior to Jasmin Paris's finish in 2024, as well as her 2023 performance (getting to the 9th book on the 4th lap), the best women's achievement was Sue Johnston's 66 miles (106 km) in 2001. More than 30 competitors failed to reach the first book (two miles). Some runners who get far enough in the race experience sleep deprivation and hallucinations, with little time to spare for sleep.

When a runner drops out of the race, a bugler plays "Taps" upon their return to the start/end point. Cantrell has said that the call "rings out all night long on the first night."

== Reputation ==
The race, known as "The Race That Eats Its Young", has been referred to as a "satanic running adventure." It is considered a countercultural event, particularly due to its low monetary cost to enter and its eccentricities. Cantrell himself has been described as "definitely a character" by finisher John Kelly, who stated that Cantrell's persona Lazarus Lake "comes off as a sadist that's out to torture people and watch them fail, but he loves nothing more than to watch people succeed." Cantrell argues that most runners should fail to complete the race, as failure is essential to growth.

=== In media ===
In 2013, race veterans wanted the race to remain obscure, and thus were opposed to news reporting about it, while younger athletes were more likely to want the race to receive recognition. In 2014, documentary film The Barkley Marathons: The Race That Eats Its Young was released, covering the 2012 edition of the race. This documentary caused a large rise in its popularity, despite the number of entrants staying around 40.

== Finishers ==
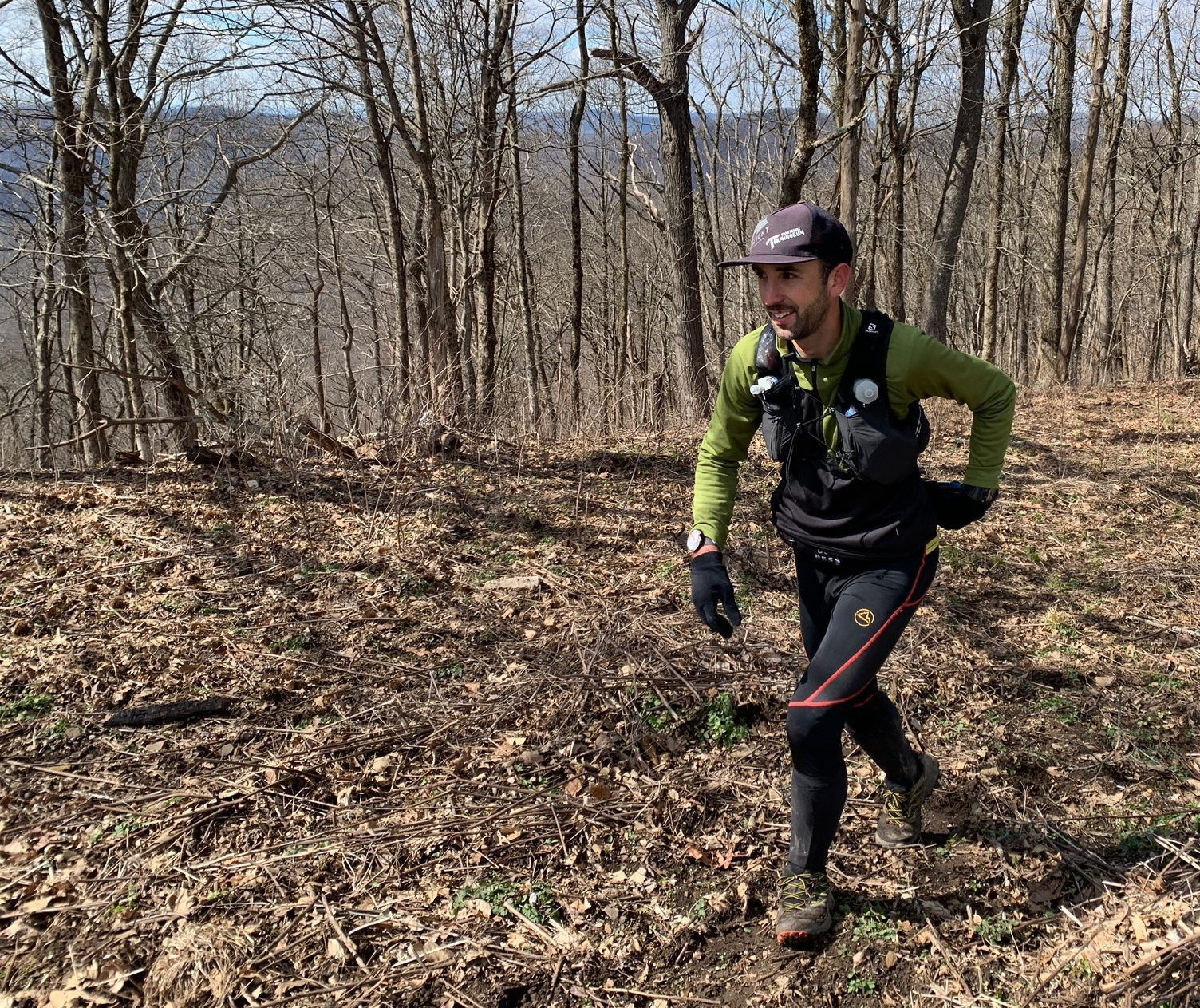
Aurélien Sanchez finished in 2023 with a time of 58:23:12.

The race is considered to be one of the most challenging ultramarathons held in the United States, if not the world. Cantrell stated in 2013 that most of these finishers had a science or engineering background, and that all except one had an advanced degree. As of 2026, about 63% of the races had ended with no finishers.

As of the end of the 2026 event, the full, five-loop race has been completed within 60 hours a total of 26 times by 20 runners. There were no finishers in 2026.

Official finishers of the Barkley Marathons
Year	Name	Time	Notes
1995	Mark Williams	59:28:48	First finisher
2001	David Horton	58:21:00	New record
2001	Blake Wood	58:21:01	
2003	Teddy Keizer	56:57:52	New record
2004	Mike Tilden	57:25:18	
2004	Jim Nelson	57:28:25	
2008	Brian Robinson	55:42:27	New record
2009	Andrew Thompson	57:37:19	
2010	Jonathan Basham	59:18:44	
2011	Brett Maune (1)	57:13:33	
2012	Brett Maune (2)	52:03:08	Current record
2012	Jared Campbell (1)	56:00:16	
2012	John Fegyveresi	59:41:21	
2013	Nick Hollon	57:39:24	
2013	Travis Wildeboer	58:41:45	
2014	Jared Campbell (2)	57:53:20	
2016	Jared Campbell (3)	59:32:30	
2017	John Kelly (1)	59:30:53	
2023	Aurélien Sanchez	58:23:12	
2023	John Kelly (2)	58:42:23	
2023	Karel Sabbe	59:53:33	
2024	Ihor Verys	58:44:59	
2024	John Kelly (3)	59:15:38	
2024	Jared Campbell (4)	59:30:32	
2024	Greig Hamilton	59:38:42	
2024	Jasmin Paris	59:58:21	First female finisher

== Berkeley Marathons ==
In the United Kingdom, a tribute race known as the Berkeley Marathons is held annually in Berkeley, Gloucestershire. The event was established by race director Paul Breen following a suggestion from Lazarus Lake, who encouraged the location-based pun (Note: The British English pronunciation of "Berkeley" is essentially identical to the American English pronunciation of "Barkley".) during a meeting at the 2019 National Running Show.

Modeled closely on the Tennessee original, the British iteration requires runners to complete five loops of approximately 26 miles (42 km) each, navigating via map and compass to locate paperback books and tear out pages as proof of passage. Unlike the 60-hour limit of the original, the Berkeley Marathons enforces a strict 24-hour cumulative cut-off for the roughly 130 miles (210 km) distance. As of late 2025, no runner had successfully finished the full five-loop course.

== See also ==
- The Art O'Neill Challenge, an ultramarathon event in Dublin, Ireland which was also inspired by a jailbreak
- The Chartreuse Terminorum, a Barkley-inspired event in France
- Big's Backyard Ultra
