= Main Sudetes Trail =

Hiking trail in Poland

Mieczysław Orłowicz Main Sudetes Trail Polish: Główny Szlak Sudecki im. Mieczysława Orłowicza
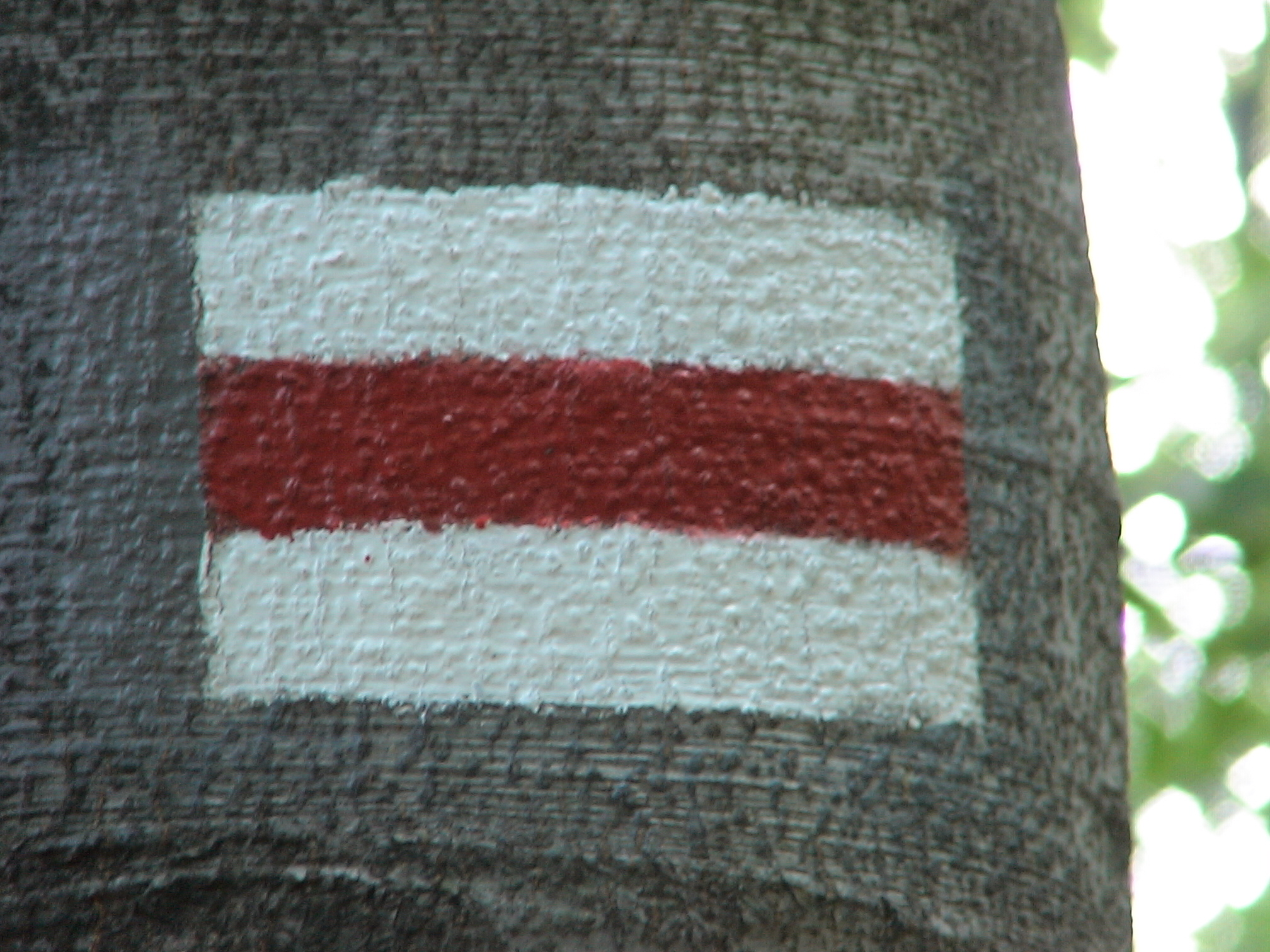
- Trail blazing
- Length: 443 km (275 mi)
- Location: Sudetes, Poland
- Trailheads: Świeradów-Zdrój 50.908333°N 15.333333°E; Prudnik 50.319722°N 17.579167°E
- Use: Hiking
- Highest point: 1,509 metres (4,951 ft)
- Season: All year

Trail map
- Main Sudetes Trail

Mieczysław Orłowicz Main Sudetes Trail (Polish: Główny Szlak Sudecki im. Mieczysława Orłowicza, GSS) is a public hiking trail in Poland running along the Sudetes. The total length of this route is 443 km and the approximate time to cover it is about 120 hours. The trail was constructed in 1947 and throughout its history has been several times modified. It is blazed red.

== Towns and landmarks on the trail ==
The trail starts in Świeradów Zdrój in the Jizera Mountains. In Szklarska Poręba it enters the Giant Mountains, the highest mountain range on its way. For the next 20 km it merges with the Polish–Czech Friendship Trail at Szrenica and runs on the main ridge along Polish and Czech border, to reach its culminating point, Sněžka, the highest peak in the Sudetes. The path then descends to Karpacz and leads through another mountain range, the Rudawy Janowickie. Having passed Krzeszów, the Stone Mountains and Owl Mountains, the trail enters the area of the Kłodzko Valley and runs along the ridge of the Table Mountains with its reserves, spas such as Polanica-Zdrój, Duszniki-Zdrój and Kudowa-Zdrój and the Stołowe Mountains National Park, one of the youngest national parks in Poland. Then it inclines to the north to run through the Sněžník Mountains, the second highest point on the route, then along the Golden Mountains. The trail finishes in Prudnik to include the Opawskie Mountains as part of Sudetes, although until 2009 it used to finish in Paczków.

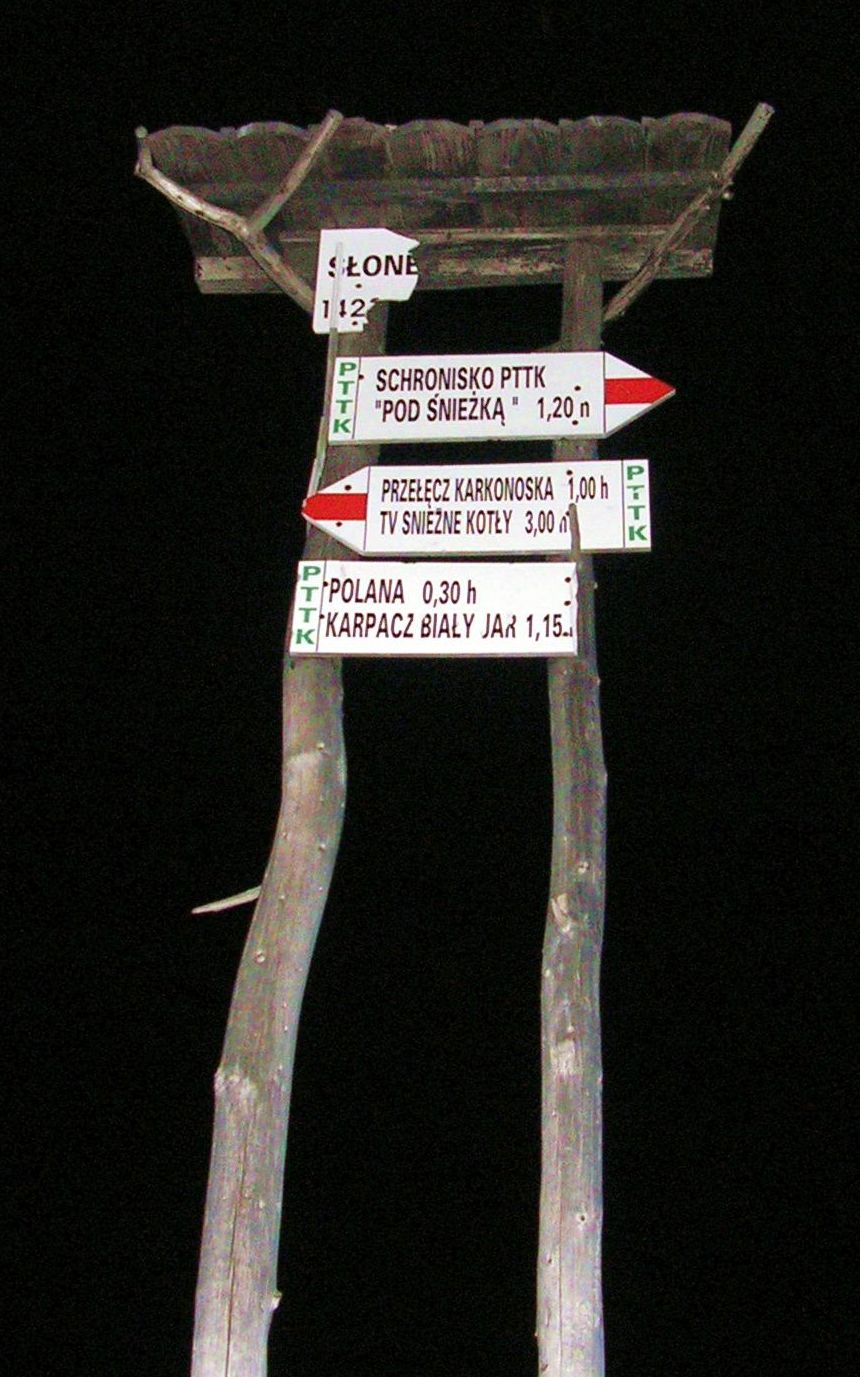
Trail blazing at the summit of Słonecznik 1,420 metres (4,660 ft)

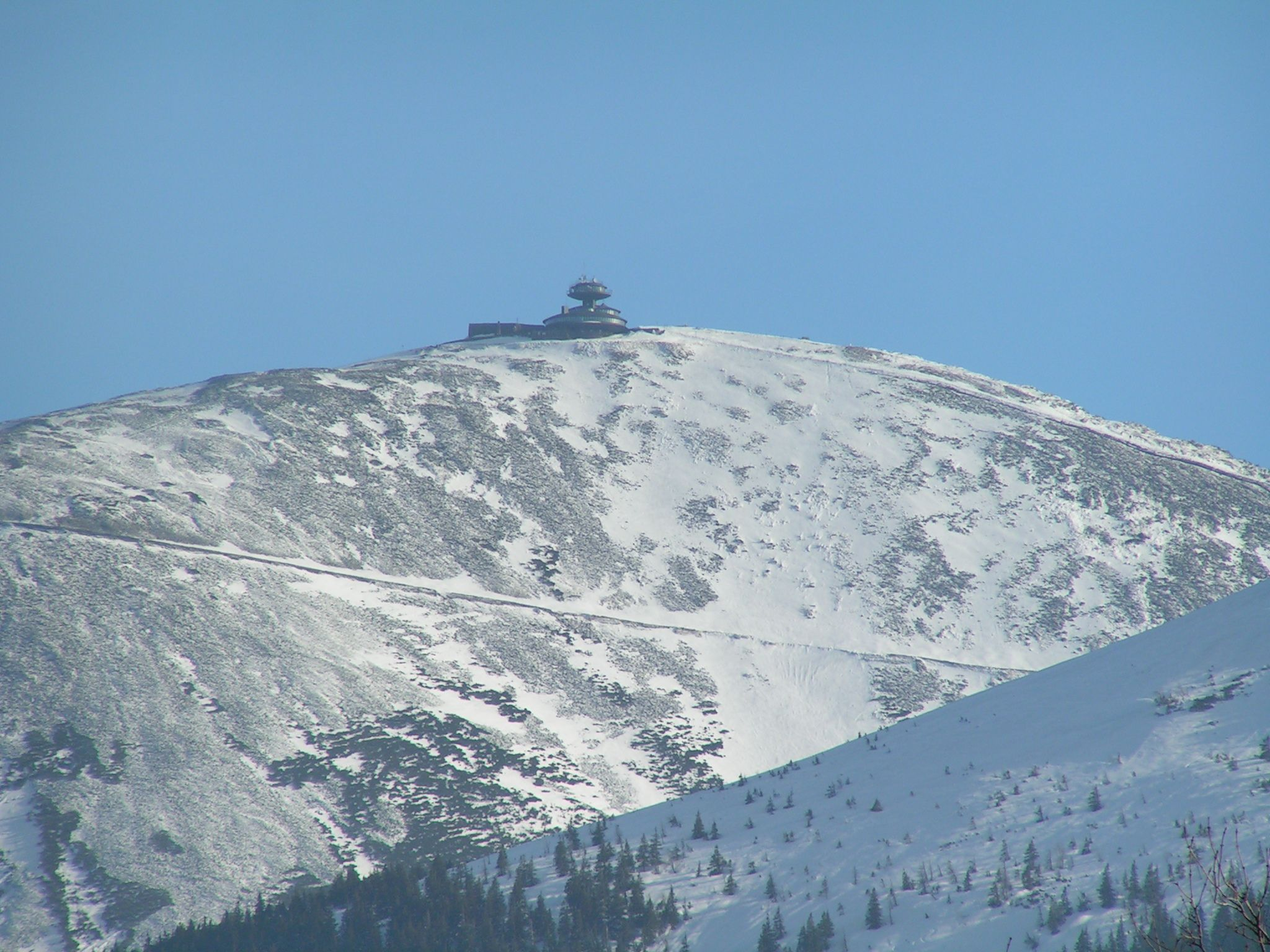
Sněžka - the highest summit next to the trail

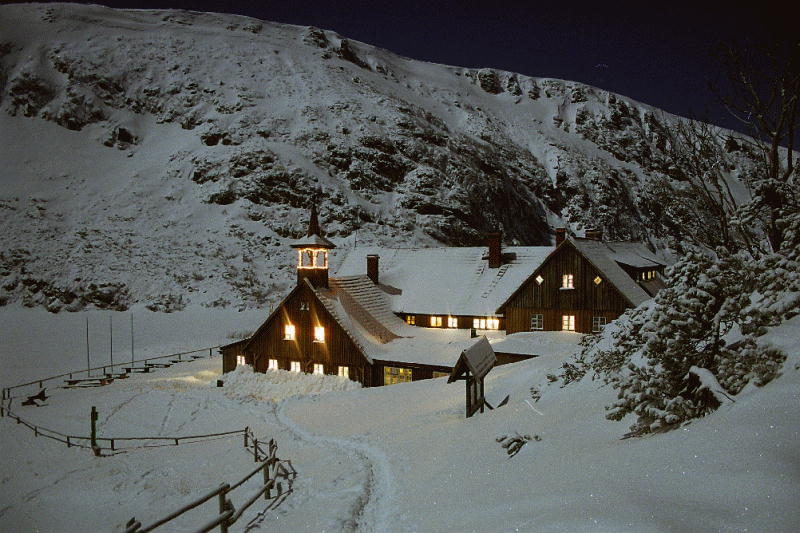
Samotnia - mountain hut in the Giant Mountains

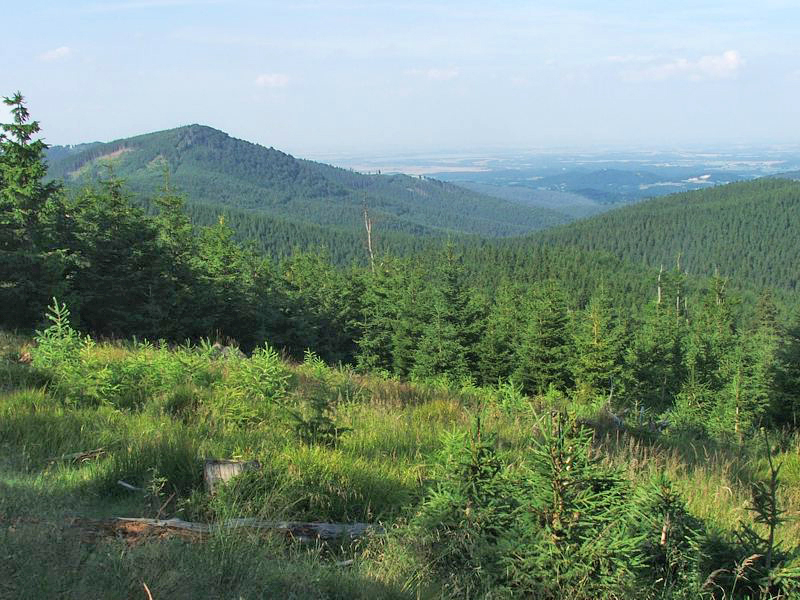
The Golden Mountains in the eastern part of the trail

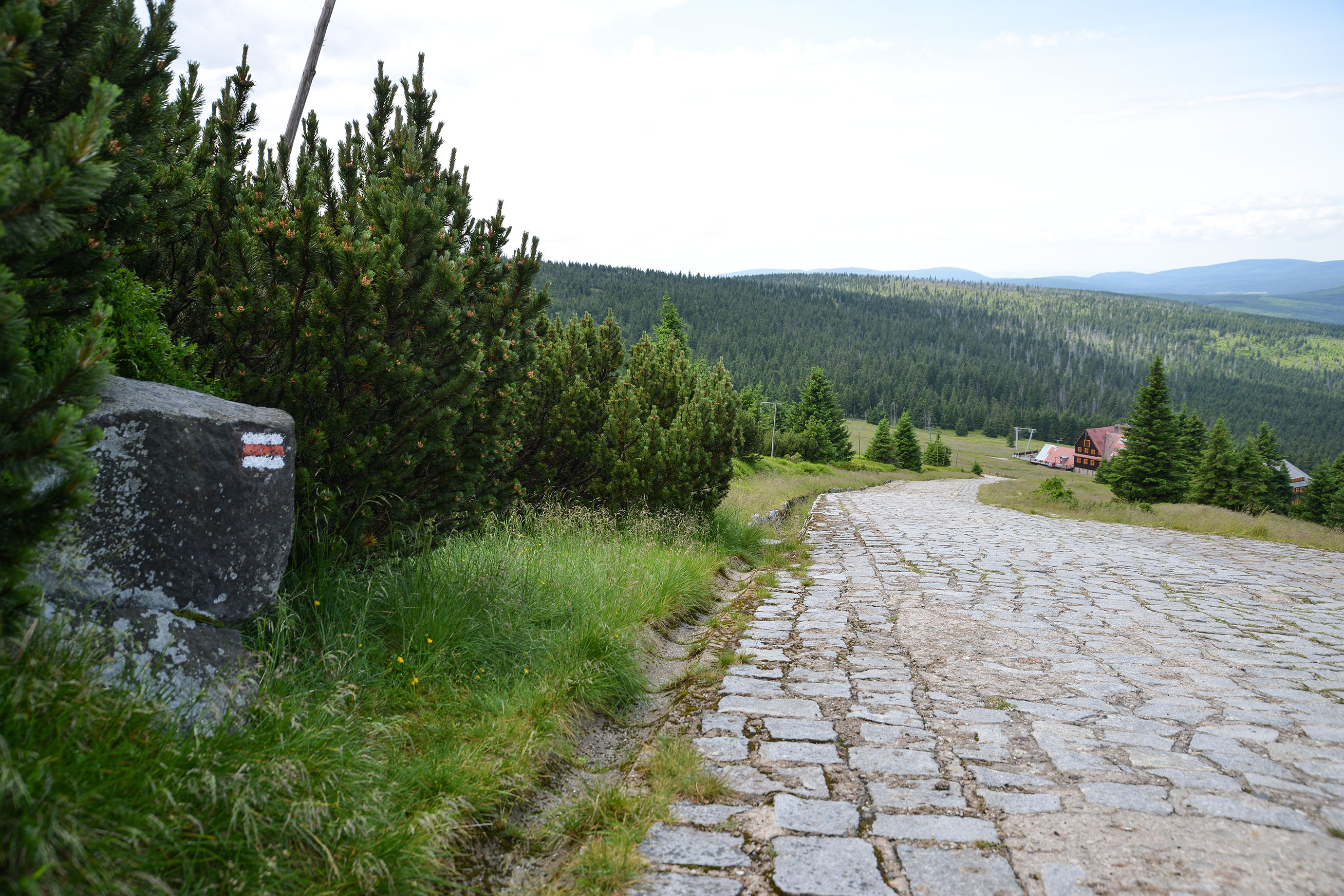
Trail towards Hala Szrenicka

== Tourism and hiking ==
The trail is accessible the whole year, although parts of it may be closed in winter due to the possibility of avalanches (Giant Mountains) as well as dangerous marshes (Stołowe Mountains). It does not involve any kind of advanced climbing, neither the mountain ranges are steep; nevertheless the long-distance hiking requires advance preparations. In the most difficult parts climbing aids are provided. The trail has numerous junctions with other trails and public paths. In the Giant Mountains, it is accessible through chairlifts from both the Polish and Czech sides.

There are many mountain huts and small hotels, especially in the western and middle parts, although some of them offer only common sleeping rooms and refreshments. Polish mountain huts are obliged to overnight each person who is not able to find any other place before sunset or in an emergency. Booking in advance is recommended. Most of the huts are run by the PTTK (Polish National Tourist Society). Refreshments and organised forms of catering are available on each part of the trail, although it is recommended to bring one's own food.

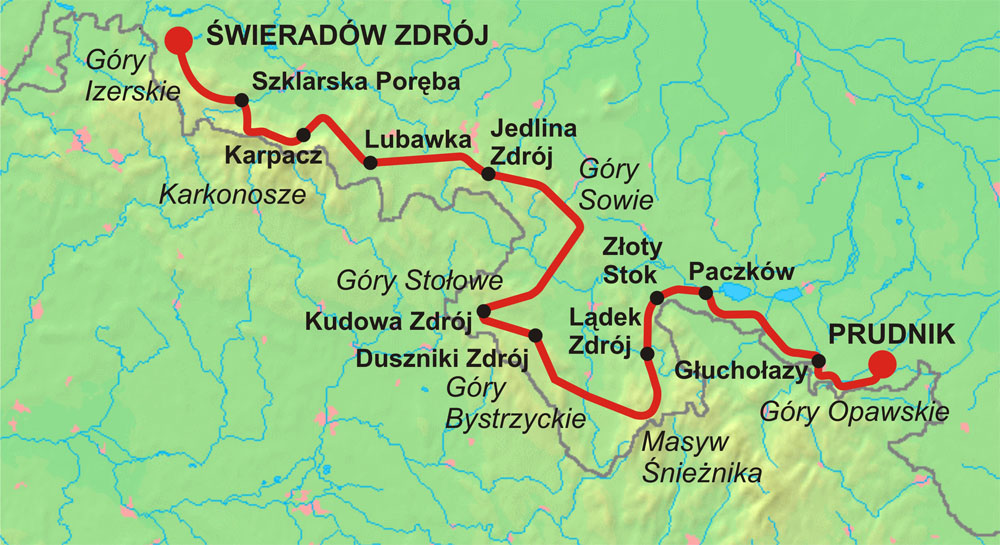
Main Sudetes Trail as seen on the map of the mountains
