= Bohdan rural hromada =

Rural hromada in Zakarpattia Oblast, Ukraine

Bohdan rural hromada Богданська сільська громада
- Hromada
- Location within Zakarpattia Oblast Location within Ukraine
- Coordinates: 48°02′09″N 24°20′35″E
- Country: Ukraine
- Oblast (province): Zakarpattia Oblast
- Raion (district): Rakhiv Raion

Area
  - Total: 488.0 km^{2} (188.4 sq mi)

Population (2023)
  - Total: 12,215
- Website: bogdanska-gromada.gov.ua

Bohdan rural territorial hromada (Ukrainian: Богданська сільська територіальна громада, romanized: Bohdanska silska terytorialna hromada) is one of the hromadas of Ukraine, located in Zakarpattia Oblast's eastern Rakhiv Raion. Its capital is the village of Bohdan.

The hromada has an area of 488.0 km^{2} (188.4 mi^{2}), as well as a population of 12,215 (as of 2023).

== Composition ==
In addition to its administrative centre, Bohdan, the hromada includes five other villages:

- Breboia
- Hoverla
- Luhy
- Roztoky
- Vydrychka

== Geography ==
Bohdansk rural territorial community is located in the Ukrainian Carpathians, in the southeast of Rakhiv Raion. The community is located in the valley of the White Tisza River (a tributary of the Tisza, Danube basin) and on the slopes of the Chornohora and Rakhiv mountains. The relief of the highlands shows signs of ancient glaciation - cirque and trough valleys.

The area of the district is 488.0 km^{2}.

The climate in Bohdan rural territorial hromada is moderately continental. The average temperature in January is −4.8 °C, in July - +18.0 °C, the average annual temperature is 7.4 °C. The average annual precipitation is 1212 mm, the maximum of which falls on June-July. With increasing altitude above sea level, the air temperature decreases and the amount of precipitation increases.

The community has lakes of glacial origin: Brebeneskul and Lakes Chornohory.

The Carpathian Biosphere Reserve is located in the Bohdan rural territorial hromada. The unique virgin forests and high-altitude meadows of this reserve belong to the most valuable ecosystems on the planet and are part of the UNESCO International Network of Biosphere Reserves. This territory is home to large predators such as the bear, wolf, and lynx. Branches of the national park are located on the territory of the community: Marmaros Reserve Massif and Chornohira Reserve Massif.
