= Rakhiv urban hromada =

Urban hromada in Zakarpattia Oblast, Ukraine

Rakhiv urban hromada Рахівська міська громада
- Hromada
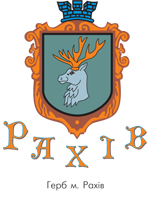
- Seal

- Location within Zakarpattia Oblast Location within Ukraine
- Coordinates: 48°03′00″N 24°12′00″E
- Country: Ukraine
- Oblast (province): Zakarpattia Oblast
- Raion (district): Rakhiv Raion

Area
  - Total: 252.5 km^{2} (97.5 sq mi)

Population (2023)
  - Total: 23,601
- Website: rakhiv-mr.gov.ua

Rakhiv urban territorial hromada (Ukrainian: Рахівська міська територіальна громада, romanized: Rakhivska miska terytorialna hromada) is a hromada of Ukraine, located in the country's western Zakarpattia Oblast. Its administrative centre is the city of Rakhiv.

Rakhiv urban hromada has a total area of 252.5 km^{2} (97.5 mi^{2}). Its population is 23,601 (as of 2023).

== Settlements ==
In addition to one city (Rakhiv), the hromada includes the following six villages:

- Bilyn
- Vilkhovatyi
- Dilove
- Kostylivka
- Kruhlyi
- Khmeliv

== Geography ==
Rakhiv urban territorial hromada is located in the Ukrainian Carpathians, in the north of Rakhiv district, in the middle and lower parts of the Black Tisza river valley (a tributary of the Tisza). The community is located in the valley of the Black Tisza River, on the slopes of the Svydovets, Chornohora and Rakhiv mountains. The relief of the highlands shows signs of ancient glaciation - cirque and trough valleys.

The area of the district is 252.5 km^{2}.

The climate in Rakhiv urban territorial hromada is moderately continental. The average temperature in January is -4.8 °C, in July - +18.0 °C, the average annual temperature is 7.4 °C. The average annual precipitation is 1212 mm, the maximum of which falls on June-July. With increasing altitude above sea level, the air temperature decreases and the amount of precipitation increases.

The Black Tisza, a left tributary of the Tisza River (Danube basin), begins in the Rakhiv urban territorial hromada.

Gold deposits (Sauljak deposit) and marble deposits (Trybushanske deposit) are being developed in the community.

The Carpathian Biosphere Reserve is located in the Rakhiv urban territorial hromada. The unique virgin forests and high-altitude meadows of this reserve belong to the most valuable ecosystems on the planet and are part of the UNESCO International Network of Biosphere Reserves. This territory is home to large predators such as the bear, wolf, and lynx.

== Transport ==
The national highway H-09 passes through the territory of the hromada, which begins in the city of Mukachevo, passes through the community and ends in the city of Lviv. Also, a railway line has been laid through the territory of the hromada, which passes through the settlements of the Yasinyansk territorial community to Kyiv, Odessa, and Dnipro.
