= Kosivska Poliana =

Kosivska Poliana Косівська Поляна Cosăuți
- Village
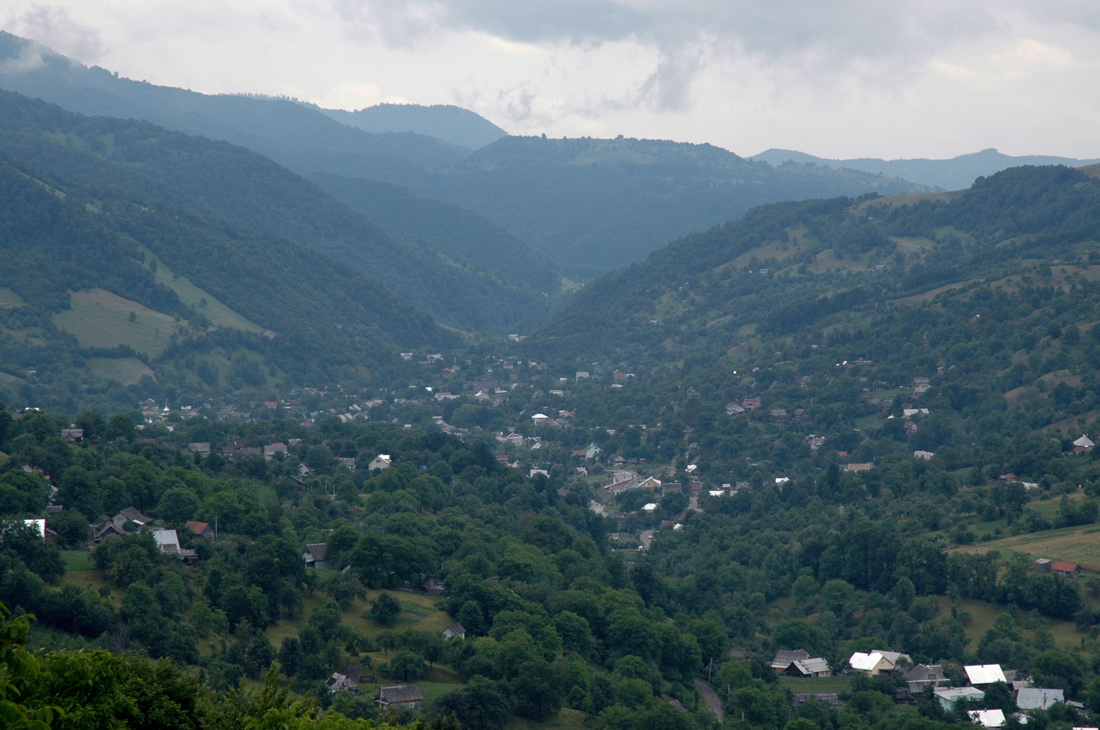
- Interactive map of Kosivska Poliana
- Location within Zakarpattia Oblast Location within Ukraine
- Coordinates: 47°57′13″N 24°03′42″E
- Oblast (province): Rakhiv Raion

Area
  - Total: 11,290 km^{2} (4,360 sq mi)

Population
  - Total: 4,222

Kosivska Poliana (Ukrainian: Косівська Поляна, Hungarian: Kaszómező, Yiddish: פאליען-קוסוביצקי, romanized: Polien-Kosovitzki) is a village in the Rakhiv Raion (district) of Zakarpattia Oblast (province) of western Ukraine.

== Geography ==
The village is spread out on the slopes of two ridges in the Svydivets Massif . Not far from the village are two passes of local importance: to the northeast - Rakhivskyi pass, to the west - Kobyletskyi pass. The village is located on the western slope of Kobila (1177 m).

The distance to the regional center of Uzhhorod from the village is 189 km, and to the community center of the village of Velyky Bychkiv - 13 km.

The climate in Kosivska Poliana settlement hromada is moderately continental. The average temperature in January is -4.8 °C, in July - +18.0 °C, the average annual temperature is 7.4 °C. The average annual precipitation is 1212 mm, the maximum of which falls on June–July. With increasing altitude above sea level, the air temperature decreases and the amount of precipitation increases.

The Shopurka River, a right tributary of the Tisza, flows through the village. Not far from the southern outskirts of the village of Kobyletskaya Polyana on the river is the Kobyletsky Guk cascade waterfall, with a total height of 22 m.

The territory of the village is located next to the Carpathian Biosphere Reserve, namely the Kuziya reserve massif, which is part of the transboundary natural object Ancient and Primeval Beech Forests of the Carpathians and Other Regions of Europe.

On the slope of Mount Kobyla, east of the village of Kobyletska Polyana, there is the Arnica Botanical Reserve, which protects the growth area of mountain arnica, a valuable medicinal plant.

The community's economy is represented by forestry, agriculture, and manufacturing industry.
