= Velykyi Bychkiv settlement hromada =

Settlement hromada in Zakarpattia Oblast, Ukraine

Velykyi Bychkiv settlement hromada Великобичківська селищна громада
- Hromada
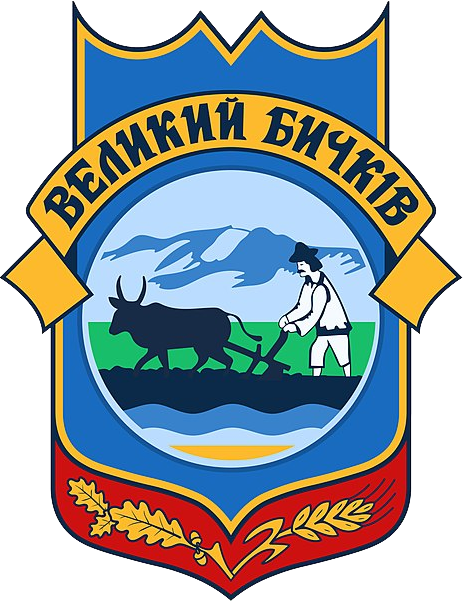
- Coat of arms

- Location within Zakarpattia Oblast Location within Ukraine
- Coordinates: 47.9667°N 24.015°E
- Country: Ukraine
- Oblast (province): Zakarpattia Oblast
- Raion (district): Rakhiv Raion

Area
  - Total: 574.6 km^{2} (221.9 sq mi)

Population (2023)
  - Total: 29,521
- Website: bychkivrada.gov.ua

Velykyi Bychkiv settlement territorial hromada (Ukrainian: Великобичківська селищна територіальна громада, romanized: Velykobychkivska selyshchna terytorialna hromada) is a hromada of Ukraine, located in Rakhiv Raion within the country's western Zakarpattia Oblast. Its capital is the rural settlement of Velykyi Bychkiv.

The hromada has an area of 574.6 km^{2} (221.9 mi^{2}), as well as a population of 29,521 (as of 2023).

== Composition ==
Formed on June 12, 2020 by merging the Velykobychkivska and Kobyletsko-Polyanska settlement councils, as well as the Verkhnyovodyanska, Vodytska, Kosivsko-Polyanska, Luzhanska and Rosishkivska village councils of the Rakhiv district.

In addition to two rural settlements (Velykyi Bychkiv and Kobyletska Poliana), the hromada includes seven villages:

- Kosivska Poliana
- Luh
- Plaiuts
- Rosishka
- Strymba
- Verkhnie Vodiane
- Vodytsia

== Geography ==
The area of the district is 574.6 km^{2} (221.9 mi^{2}). The territorial community is located near the border of Ukraine with Romania. The territory of the community is located in the Ukrainian Carpathians, among broad-leaved forests, on the right bank of the Tysa River.

The climate in Velykyi Bychkiv settlement hromada is moderately continental. The average temperature in January is -4.8 °C, in July - +18.0 °C, the average annual temperature is 7.4 °C. The average annual precipitation is 1212 mm, the maximum of which falls on June-July. With increasing altitude above sea level, the air temperature decreases and the amount of precipitation increases.

Velykyi Bychkiv settlement hromada has tourist resources - mountain meadows, mineral springs, waterfalls.On the territory of the Velykyi Bychkiv settlement hromada there are about 15 mineral springs of various chemical composition (carbon dioxide and hydrogen sulfide springs).

The mineral resources of Velykyi Bychkiv settlement hromada are green tuff.

The community's economy is represented by forestry, agriculture, and manufacturing industry.
