= Kobyla (mountain) =

Mountain in Ukraine

- Гора Кобила
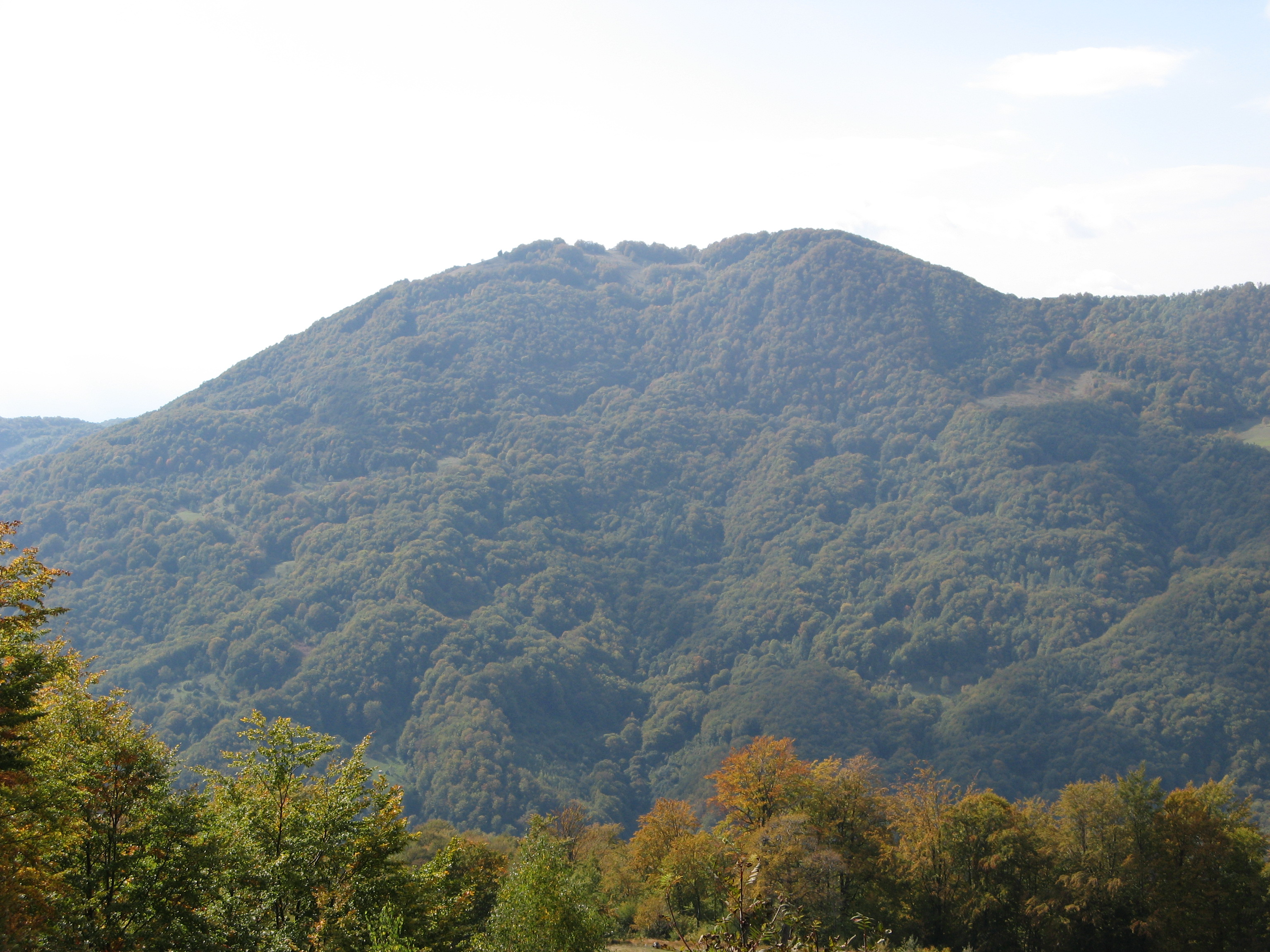
- Kobyla Mountain

Highest point
- Elevation: 1,177 m (3,862 ft)
- Coordinates: 48°2′12″N 24°5′38″E

Geography
- Location within Ukraine
- Country: Ukraine
- Parent range: south of Svydovets (Carpathian Mountains)

Kobyla is a mountain in the Ukrainian Carpathians within Rakhiv Raion, Zakarpattia Oblast.

Its peak height is 1,177 meters (3,862 ft) above sea level. The western, southern and eastern slopes of the mountain are very steep, while the north slope just passes in a gentle continuing ridge that extends north to the Svydovets range. Although its slopes are forested, the top is covered in meadow.

At the foot of the mountain village lie Kobyletska Poliana (northwest) and Kosivska Poliana village (south-east). To the south of the summit is Kobyletska pass.

== Legend ==
In the village of Kobyletska Poliana there is a legend of its founders. People say that the village was named after the mare that while Robin in the area went to the summit with four bags of gold. Past it were Hungarians, who at that time fought with Opryshky. Opryshky died, and the mare went to the cave with bags of gold and never returned.

Since Kobyletska Polyana village called, and the mountain is called mares.

== Tourism ==
In the vicinity Mountain Hotel and tourist facilities, built cable car ski type length 500 m.

Each month, the mountain attracts 20 to 30 (sometimes up to 100) tourists. The mountain built a small house for tourists and shepherds and sheep. On the mountain there are still buildings from the time of World War II, which are already beginning to crumble. Example: House for soldiers and dilapidated headquarters of Ukrainian partisans at the end of the mountaintop.

== Photos ==
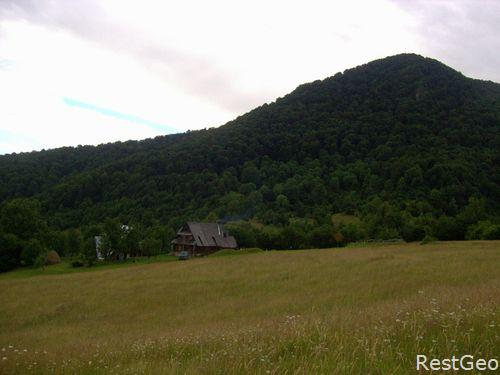
View of the mares with Kobyletska pass

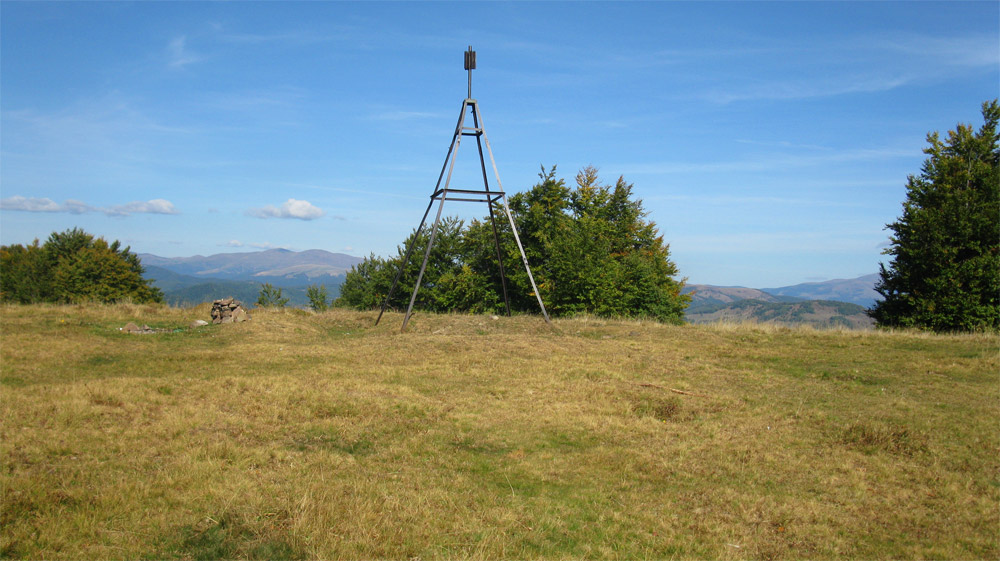
At the top of the mountain
