= Svydovets Protected Massif =

Protected area in the Ukrainian Carpathians

- Ukrainian: Свидовецький заповідний масив
- IUCN category Ia (strict nature reserve)
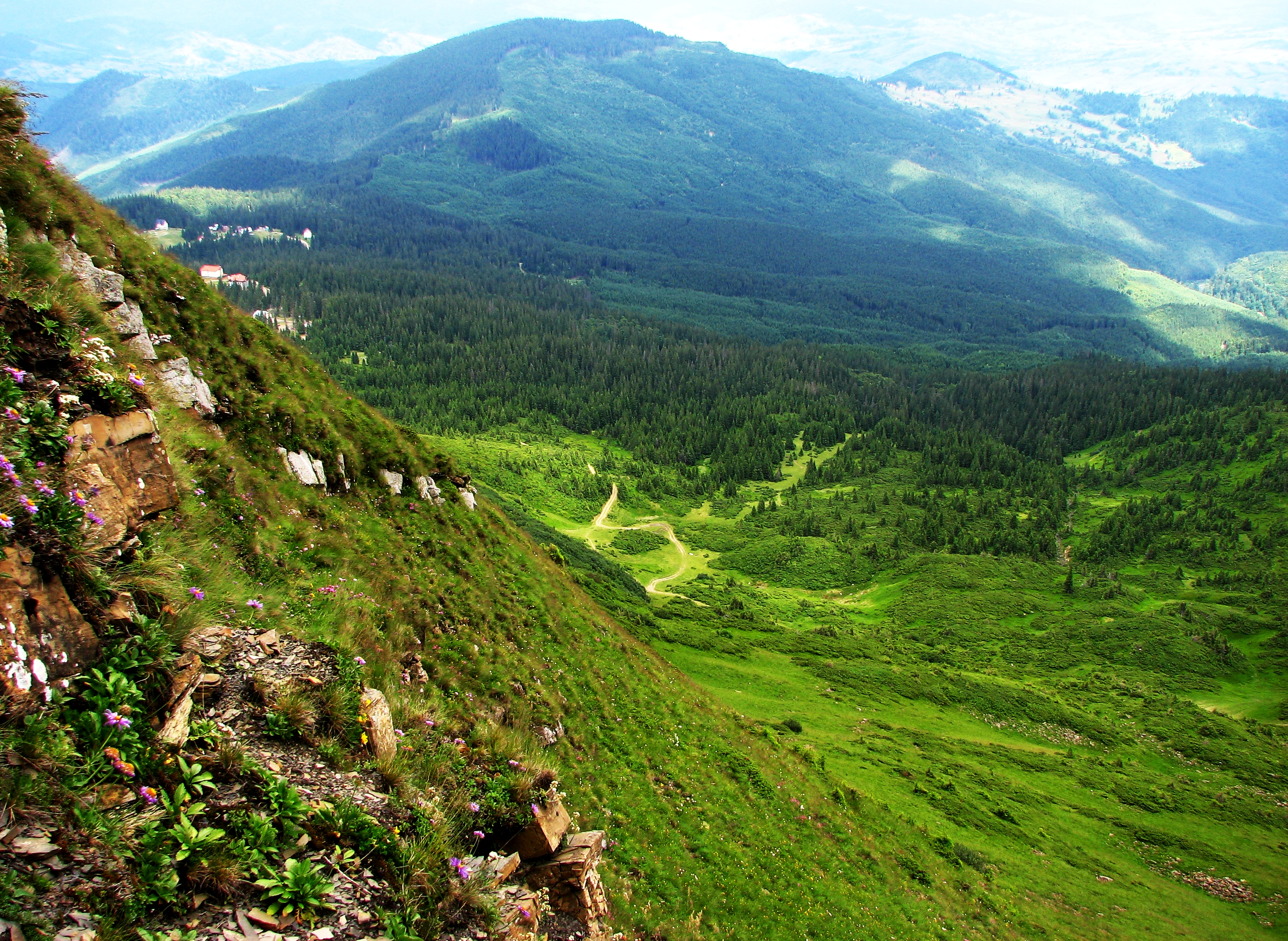
- Svydovets landscape

- Location within Ukraine
- Location: Ukraine
- Nearest city: Rakhiv
- Coordinates: 48°09′N 24°12′E
- Area: 6,580 hectares (16,300 acres)
- Max. elevation: 1883 m.a.s.l.
- Min. elevation: 600 m.a.s.l.
- World Heritage site: 2007
- Website: https://kbz.in.ua/en

UNESCO World Heritage Site
- Official name: Svydovets
- Part of: Ancient and Primeval Beech Forests of the Carpathians and Other Regions of Europe
- Criteria: Natural: ix
- Reference: 1133
- Inscription: 2007 (31st Session)

Svydovets Protected Massif (Ukrainian: Свидовецький заповідний масив) is a protected area in the Ukrainian Carpathians near Rakhiv in the Zakarpattia Oblast. The protected massif has an area of 6,580 hectares (16,300 acres) and is located at an elevation of 600–1883 m.a.s.l. in the highest region of the Svydovets mountain range.

== Status ==
Svydovets Protected Massif is included in the Carpathian Biosphere Reserve, that is part of the World Network of Biosphere Reserves of UNESCO. It is listed with the UNESCO World Heritage Sites as part of the Ancient and Primeval Beech Forests of the Carpathians and Other Regions of Europe.

It is protected under the Emerald Network of environmentally important conservation areas established by the Council of Europe. The Natura 2000 network apply there.

== See also ==
- List of World Heritage Sites in Ukraine
