= Mickola Vorokhta =

Ukrainian artist-painter (born 1947)

- Микола Ворохта (Ukrainian)
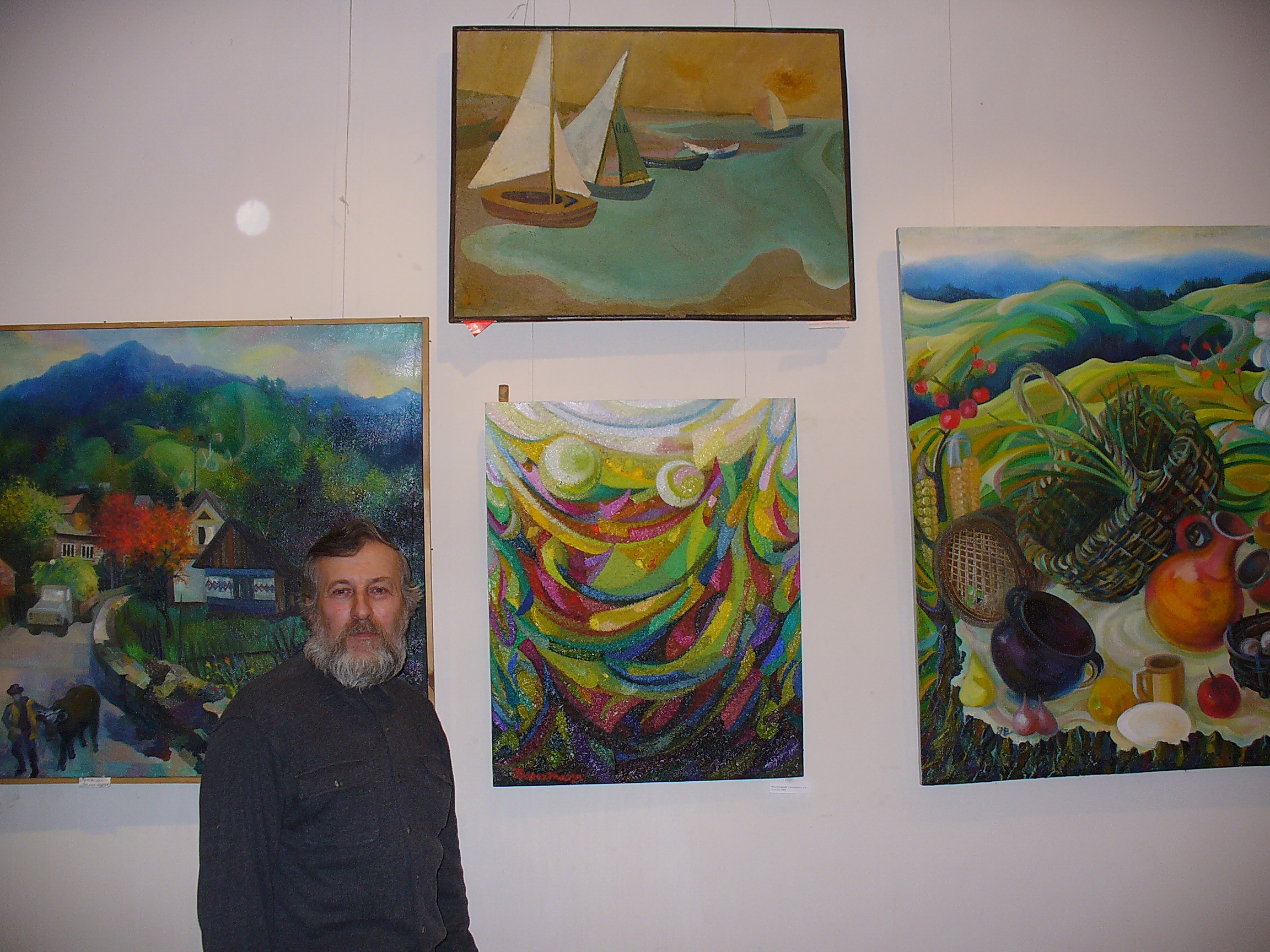
- Vorokhta at his exhibition in 2010
- Born: 18 July 1947 (age 79); Rakhiv, Ukrainian SSR, Soviet Union
- Known for: Painting, graphics
- Spouse: Alla Vorokhta
- Awards: Merited Artist of Ukraine
- Website: www.vorokhta.com

Mickola Vorokhta (Ukrainian: Микола Ворохта, born 18 July 1947) is a Ukrainian painter who lives and works in Odesa. In 2014, he was awarded the status of Merited Artist of Ukraine.

Mickola Vorokhta finished his education in 1971 at the Art Faculty of Odesa Pedagogical Institute (maître V. G. Efimenko). From 1974 to 1998 he was a lecturer at the art department of Odesa State Academy of Civil Engineering and Architecture. Since 1995 he has been a member of the National Union of Artists of Ukraine.

His artworks are held in collections at the Culture Ministry of Ukraine, the Slovak Museum of Ukrainian and Russian Culture, Historical Museum "Palanok", Odesa Museum of Western and Eastern Art and the Illichivsk Art Museum. They are also housed in private collections in Ukraine, Russia, the United Kingdom, the United States, France, Japan, Switzerland, Norway, Italy, Portugal, Germany, China and other countries. He was the founder and head of the artist group "Zgurt" and was awarded а Diploma of Honor for his services to art and culture by the Odesa Regional Council.

== Personal life ==
His wife Alla Vorokhta was a famous Ukrainian illustrator, graphic artist and educator.

== Bibliography ==
- https://web.archive.org/web/20160304110219/http://rakhiv-adm.org.ua/wp-content/uploads/2012/09/zr_53-54.pdf
- http://zakarpattya.net.ua/News/98157-U-Mukachevi-vidbulasia-personalna-vystavka-odeskykh-khudozhnykiv-FOTO
- http://www.japigia.com/dilloallarete.shtml?DA=eventi08
