= Alla Vorokhta =

Ukrainian illustrator and graphic artist (1946–2025)

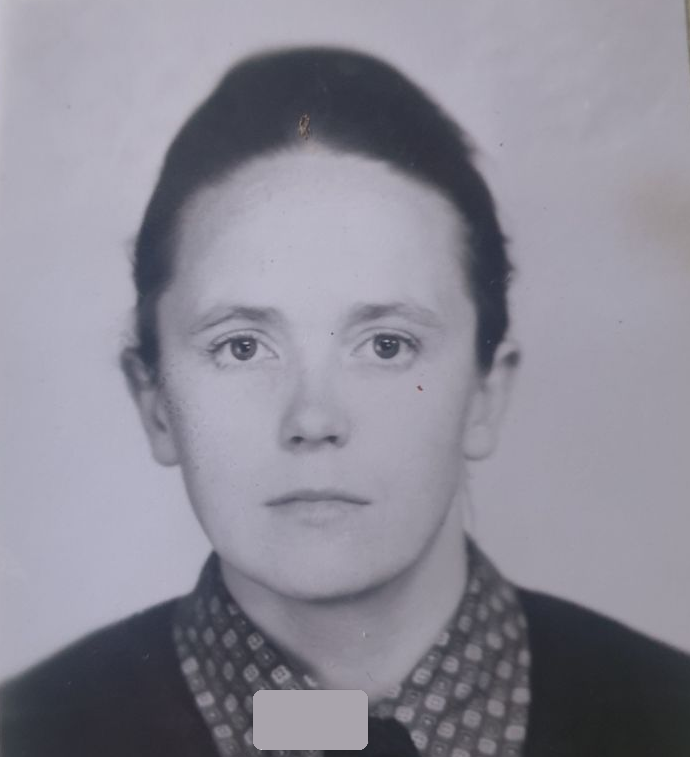
- Portrait by Mickola Vorokhta, 1997
- Born: Alla Efremova; 13 December 1946; Odesa, Ukrainian SSR, USSR
- Died: 17 February 2025; Odesa, Ukraine

Alla Ivanovna Vorokhta (Алла Іванівна Ворохта; 13 December 1946 – 17 February 2025) was a Ukrainian artist and educator who worked in the fields of graphic art, book illustration, painting, and decorative and applied arts (macrame, thread graphics, art dolls, batik, artistic painting).

== Biography ==
Alla Vorokhta was born on December 13, 1946, in the city of Odesa. She studied at an art school under Mykola Zaitsev. In 1971, she graduated from the art and graphics faculty of the Odesa Pedagogical Institute named after K. D. Ushynsky. Her professional mentor was Viktor Yefymenko.

For over 50 years, she taught at the Ushynsky Pedagogical Institute and at the Grekov Odesa Art School. Among her students are renowned Ukrainian artists such as Oleksandr Bilozor, Ivan Shyshman, Nataliia Aksyonova, Victor Korenyok, Serhii Tkachenko, Serhii Paprotskyi, Nataliia Popova, Halyna Karaman, and others. She was a member of the National Union of Artists of Ukraine since 2008.

== Artistic Work ==
Alla Vorokhta was a regular participant in prestigious international exhibitions, including the International Biennial of Drawing in Plzeň (2012) and the 12th Florence Biennale (2019). Her artworks are held in national museums and private collections in Ukraine and in 67 countries worldwide.

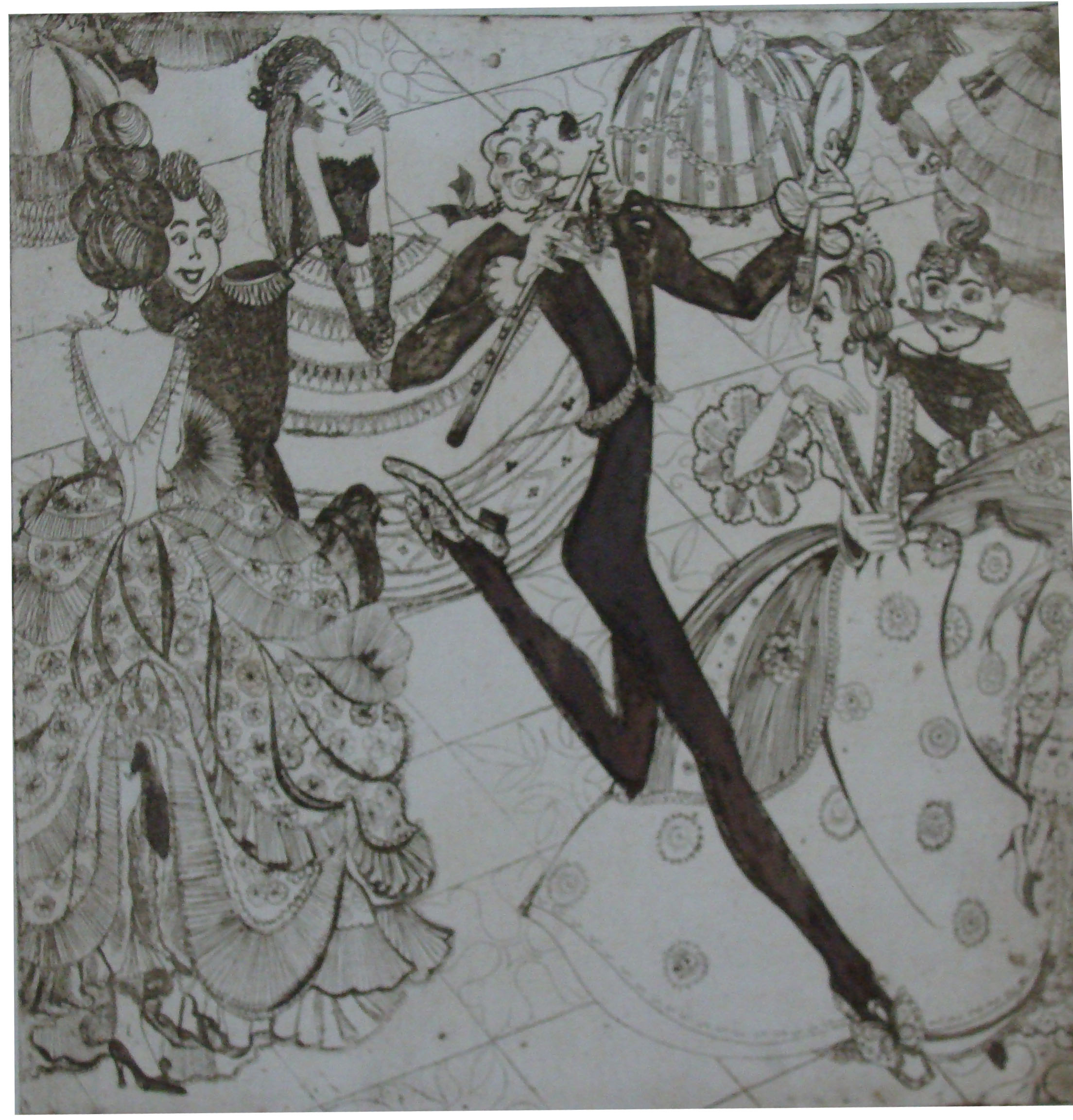
Dance teacher Razdvatris. (Illustration for Yury Olesha’s fairy tale Three Fat Men). Etching. 20×20 cm, 1977 (in the collection of the Literary Museum, Odesa).

Vorokhta's graphic works are noted for their refined lines, complex gradations of black and white, and a velvety texture. Her graphics are deeply poetic, each piece filled with a precisely articulated plastic idea. She mastered all graphic techniques equally well: etching, pen drawing, silverpoint, graphite pencil, sepia, sanguine, pastel, gouache, and watercolor.

She did not confine herself to a single genre, which is evident in her paintings, macrame panels, art dolls, batik, and decorative painting.

== Personal life ==
She was married to Mickola Vorokhta, an Honored Artist of Ukraine.

== Exhibitions ==
- Verweile doch!, O. M. Bilyi Museum of Fine Arts, Illichivsk, 2010
- Graphic Biennial, Plzeň, Czech Republic, 2012
- Dreams and Memories, Mukachevo – Odesa, 2012
- Urbi & Orbi, Odesa, 2013
- E pluribus unum, Potocki Palace, Lviv, 2016
- A Moment as Long as a Life, Odesa, 2016
- Linea tenera et aspera, Odesa, 2019
- XII Florence Biennale, Florence, Italy, 2019
- The Line of Life, Odesa, 2021–2022
