= Bohdan, Zakarpattia Oblast =

Village in Zakarpattia Oblast, Ukraine

Bohdan Богдан Tiszabogdány
- Village
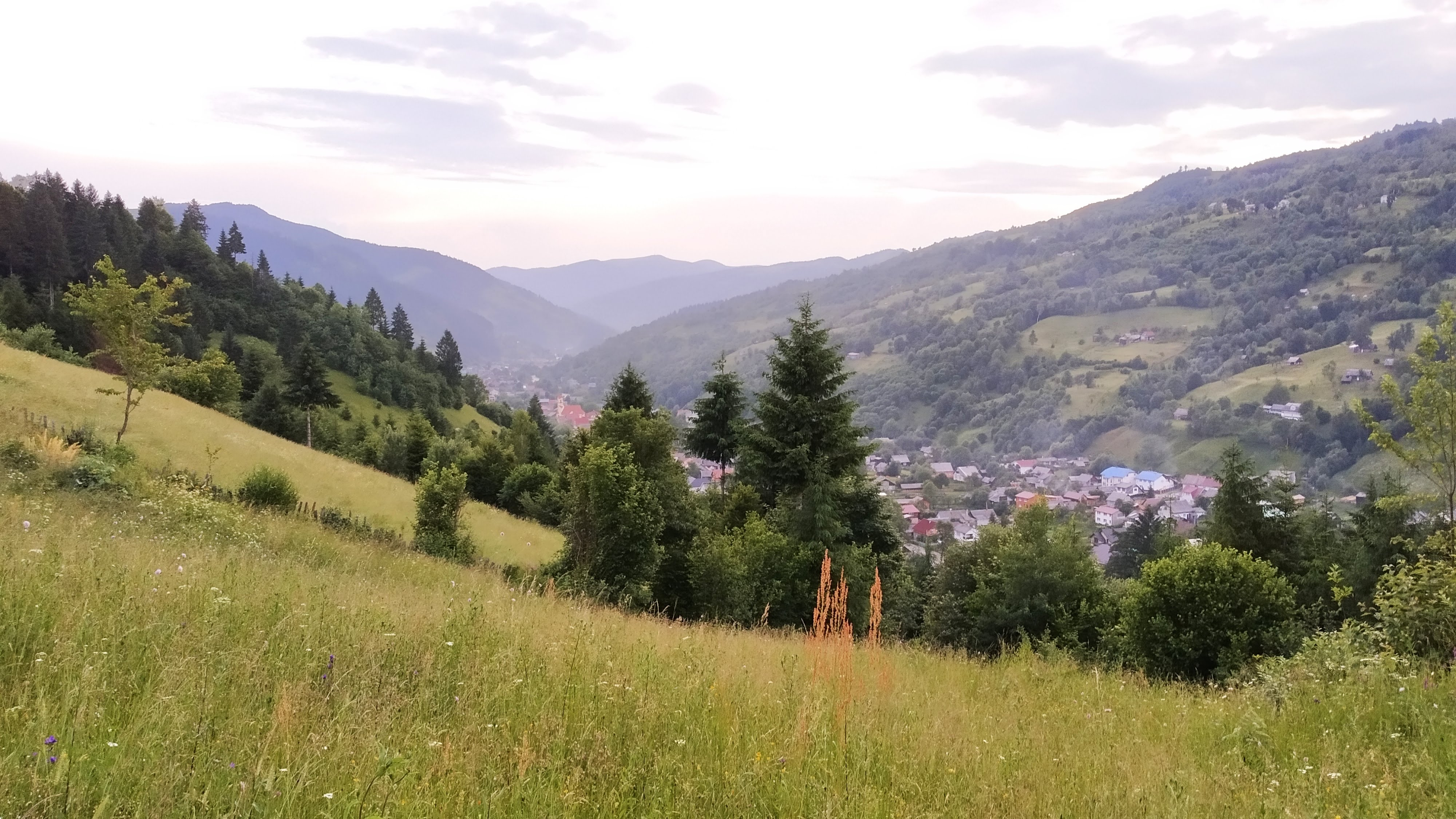

- Location of Bohdan in Zakarpattia Oblast Location of Bohdan in Ukraine
- Coordinates: 48°02′09″N 24°20′35″E
- Country: Ukraine
- Oblast: Zakarpattia Oblast
- Raion: Rakhiv Raion
- First mentioned: early 18th century

Population (2023)
  - Total: 3,971

Bohdan (Ukrainian: Богдан; Hungarian: Tiszabogdány) is a village in Rakhiv Raion, Zakarpattia Oblast, Ukraine. It is the centre of Bohdan rural hromada, one of the hromadas of Ukraine. Its population is 3,971 (as of 2023).

== History ==
Mentions of Bohdan date back to the early 17th century. The village's original population largely comprised runaway criminals and ethnic Ukrainians whose homes had been taken over by German colonists, as well as others who had migrated to be closer to their work. The village also contains the remains of a Jewish cemetery.

== Geography ==
The village of Bohdan is located in the Ukrainian Carpathians, in the center of the Rakhiv District of the Zakarpattia Oblast. The village is located on the floodplain of the White Tisza River (a tributary of the Tisza, the Danube basin), in the valley between the Chornohora and Rakhiv Mountains.

The climate of the village is moderately continental. The average temperature in January is −4.8 °C, in July - +18.0 °C, the average annual temperature is 7.4 °C. The average annual precipitation is 1212 mm, the maximum of which falls on June–July. With increasing altitude above sea level, the air temperature decreases, and the amount of precipitation increases.

Near the village of Bohdan, on Mount Borshchevytsia, there is a ski complex with a track of medium difficulty, 1500 m long.

== Demographics ==
According to the 2001 Ukrainian census, 3,277 people lived in Bohdan. 97.03% of this population spoke Ukrainian, with another 2.29% speaking Hungarian, 0.48% speaking Russian, 0.12% speaking German, and 0.03% each speaking Belarusian and Romanian (under the name of Moldovan).

== Notable residents ==
- Mykhailo Marfich, Ukrainian senior sergeant killed during the War in Donbas
- Vágner Lajos, Hungarian botanist
