= Rakhiv =

City in Zakarpattia Oblast, Ukraine

Rakhiv Рахів
- City
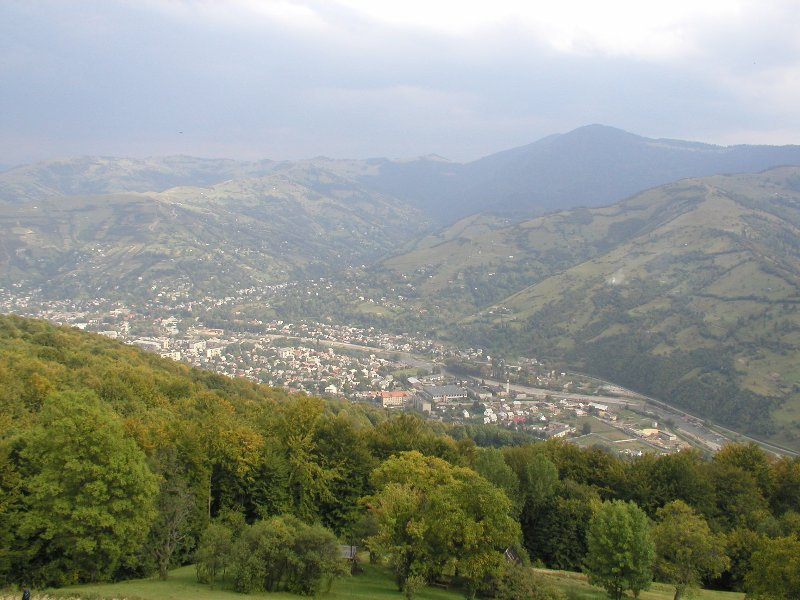
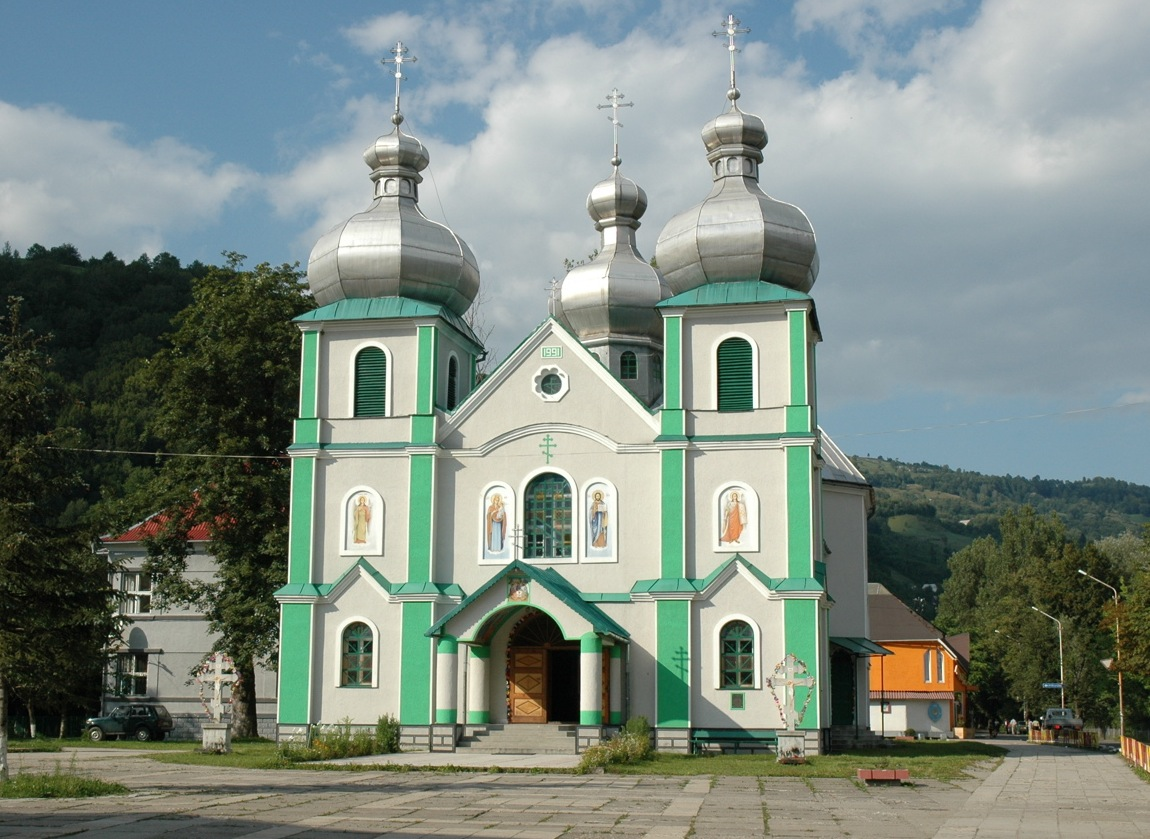
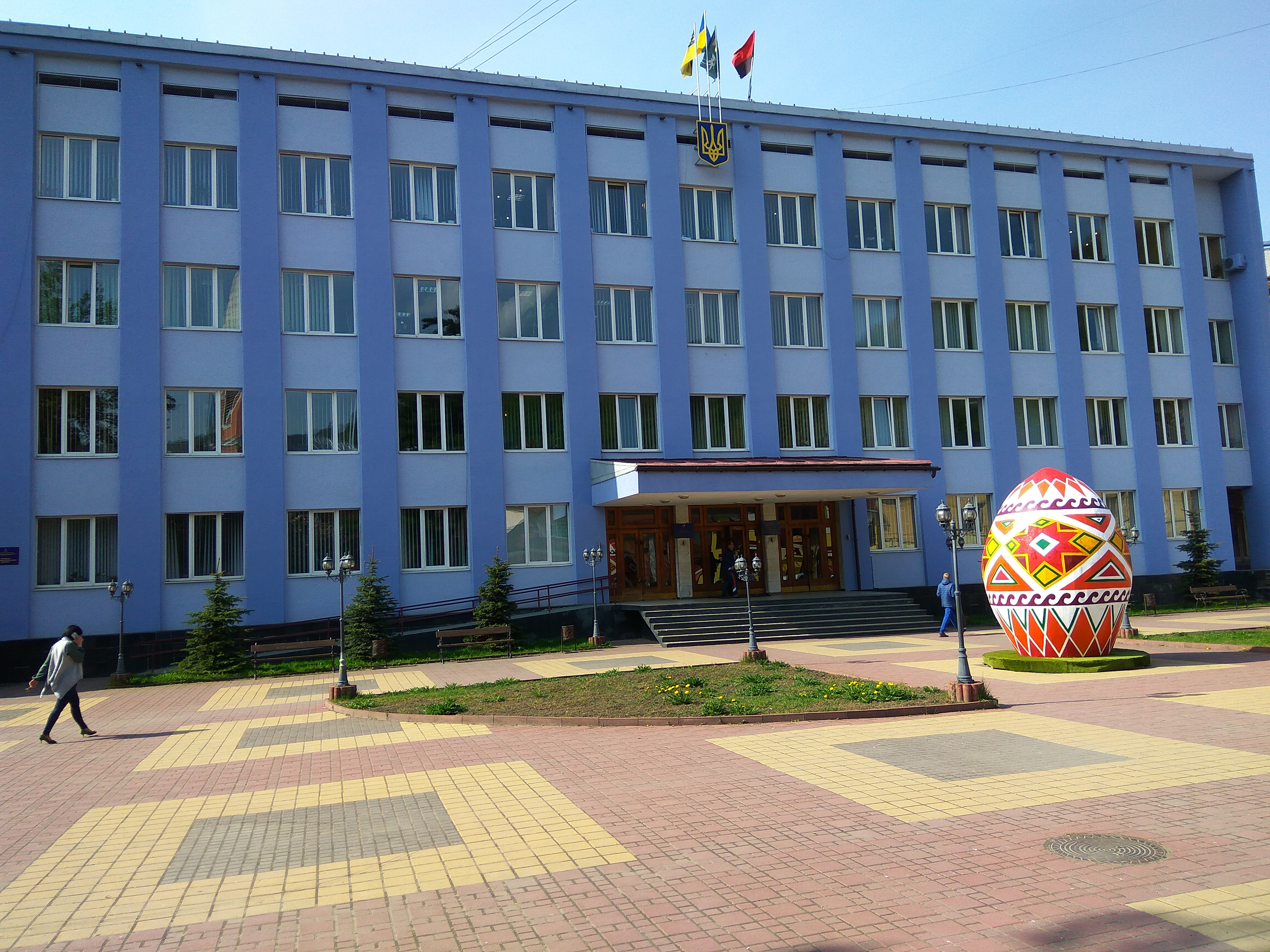
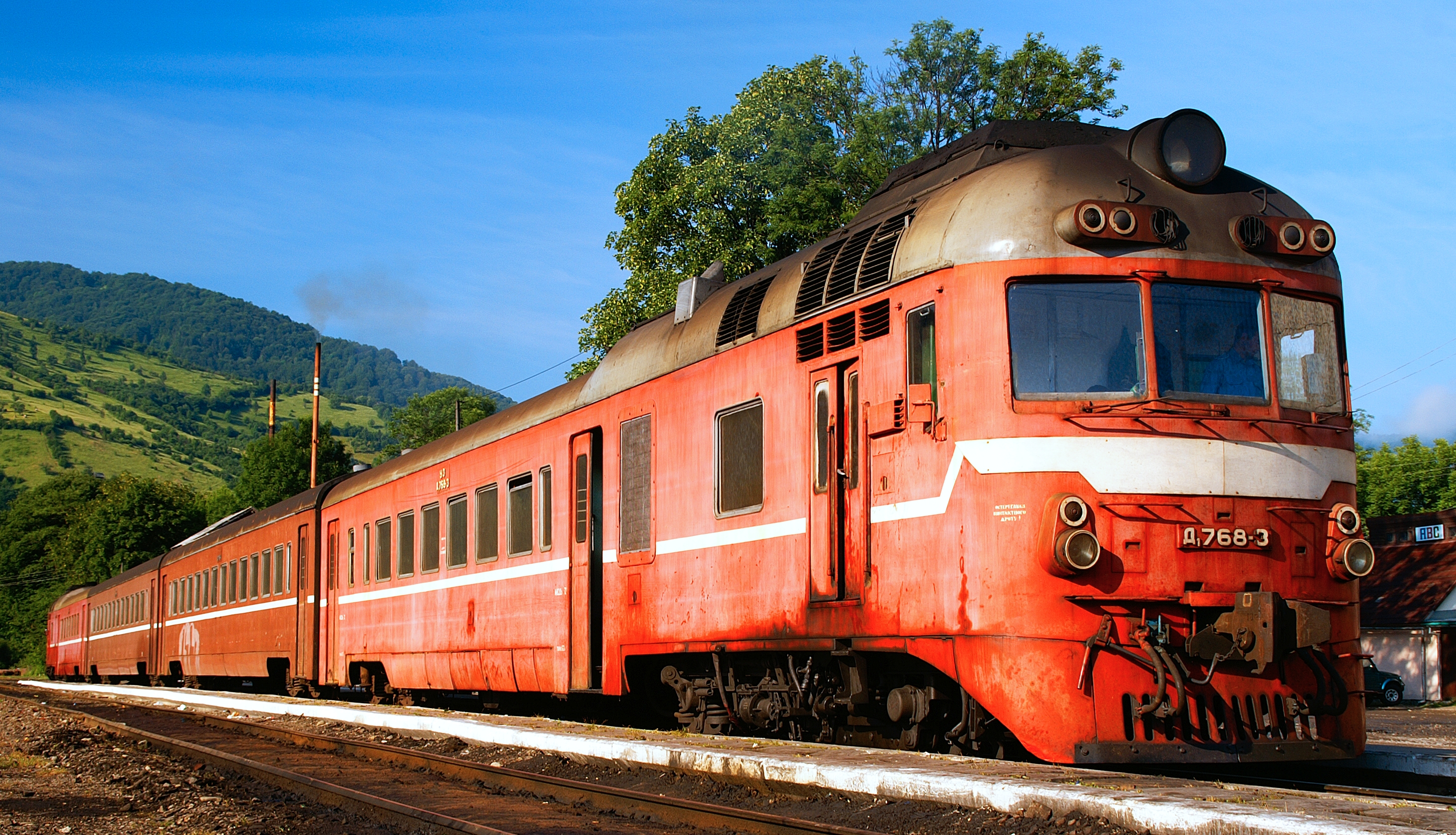
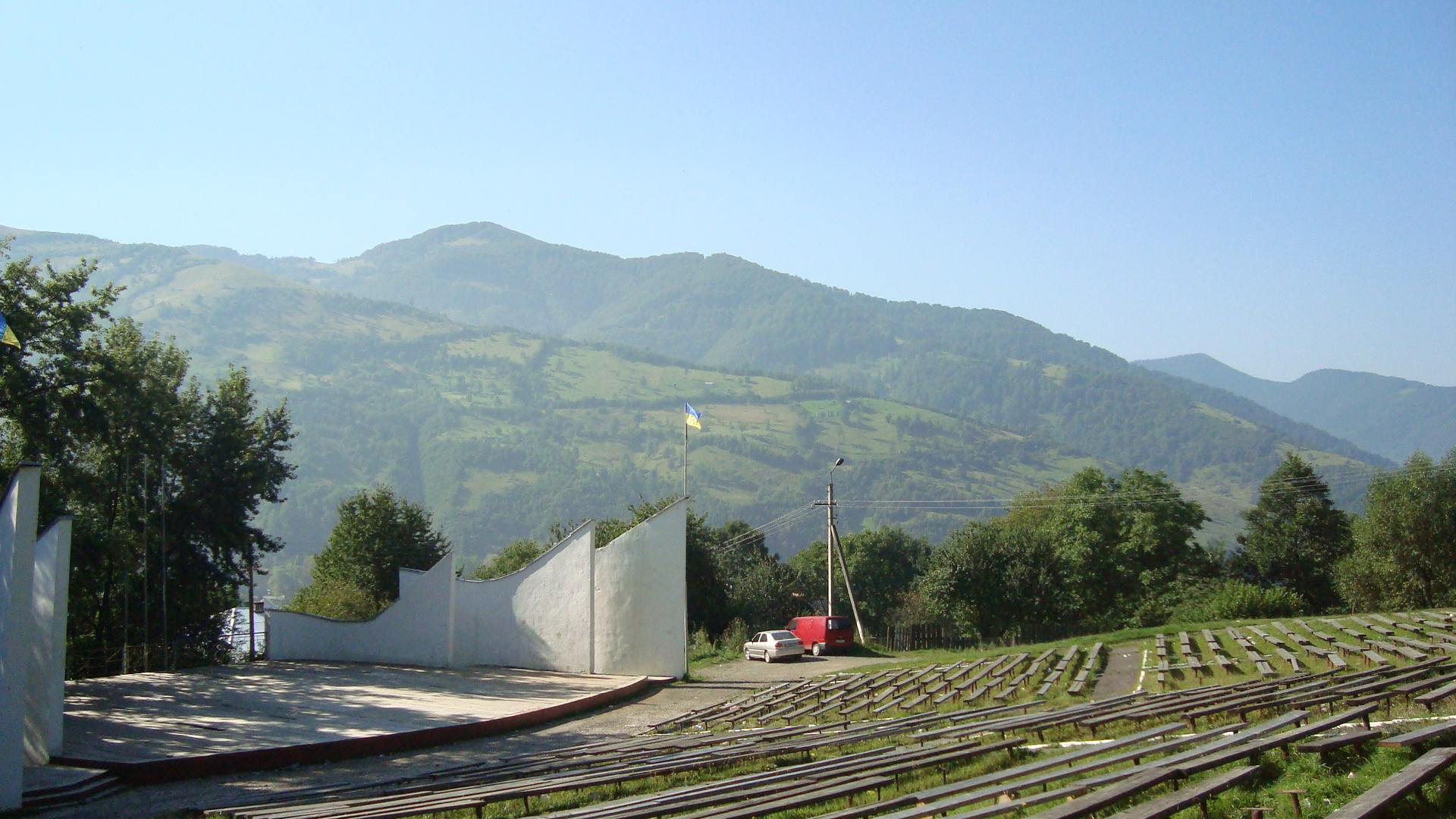
- From top, clockwise: View of Rakhiv; Administrative Building; Amphitheater; Train at the railway station; Church of the Holy Spirit

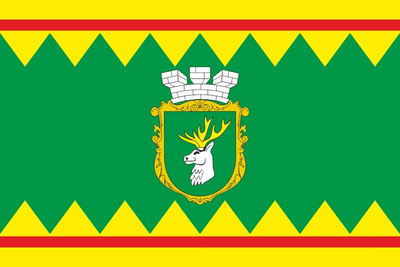
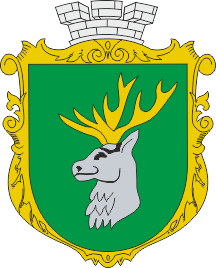
- Flag Coat of arms
- Interactive map of Rakhiv
- Location of Rakhiv Rakhiv (Ukraine)
- Coordinates: 48°03′00″N 24°12′00″E
- Country: Ukraine
- Oblast: Zakarpattia Oblast
- Raion: Rakhiv Raion
- Hromada: Rakhiv urban hromada
- Founded: 1477
- Incorporated: 1958

Government
  - Mayor: Viktor Medvid

Area
  - Total: 5.68 km^{2} (2.19 sq mi)
- Elevation: 430 m (1,410 ft)

Population (2022)
  - Total: 15,536
  - Density: 2,740/km^{2} (7,080/sq mi)
- Time zone: UTC+1 (CET)
  - Summer (DST): UTC+2 (CEST)
- Postal code: 90600
- Area code: +380-3132
- Climate: Dfb

Rakhiv (Ukrainian: Рахів, IPA: [ˈrɑxiu̯]; Hungarian: Rahó; Romanian: Rahău) is a city located in Zakarpattia Oblast (province) in western Ukraine. Part of the historical region of Hutsulshchyna, it is the administrative center of Rakhiv Raion (district). Population: 15,536 (2022 estimate).

== Names ==
There are several alternative names used for this city: Rusyn: Рахово; Hungarian: Rahó; Romanian: Rahău; Russian: Рахов, romanized: Rakhov; Belarusian: Рахаў, romanized: Rachaŭ; Yiddish: ראחוב, romanized: Rakhev or Rakhyv; Slovak: Rachov; German: Rachiw; Polish: Rachów.

== History ==
First mentioned in the 15th century, Rakhiv's date of the foundation is often taken to be 1447, although a written mentions of this settlement are attested since AD 910.

== Economy ==
Rakhiv has traditionally been specialized on paper industry and production of furniture. It is also a notable centre of tourism.

== Demographics ==
According to the 2001 census, Rakhiv had a population of 14,969 inhabitants. The overwhelming majority of Rakhiv's population were Ukrainians, followed by Hungarians, Russians, Gypsies and Germans. In terms of spoken languages, Ukrainian was the most common language (92.08%), followed by speakers of the respective Hungarian (4.8%) and Russian (2.28%) languages. As of 2017, the city population was 15,489 (2017 est.) inhabitants.

Ethnic groups in Rakhiv
	percent
Ukrainians	89.88%
Hungarians	6.93%
Russians	2.12%
Gypsies	0.36%
Germans	0.11%
Belarusians	0.11%
others	0.49%

Languages in Rakhiv
	percent
Ukrainian	92.1%
Hungarian	4.8%
Russian	2.3%
Romani	0.4%
German	0.1%
Romanian	0.1%
others	0.1%

== Geography ==
=== Features ===
Located where the White Tisza and Black Tisza join to form the Tysa river, Rakhiv, or more precisely, the nearby village of Dilove, is one of several European locations vying for the symbolic right to be Geographical centre of Europe. The sign in Dilove, the point calculated in 1887 by the Austro-Hungarian geographers, carries a Latin inscription: "Locus Perennis Dilicentissime cum libella librationis quae est in Austria et Hungaria confectacum mensura gradum meridionalium et paralleloumierum Europeum. MD CCC LXXXVII."

There was Thomas Garrigue Masaryk in his stay to study a situation on the Romanian front during World War I in Hotel "Ukraina" on the winter 1917 - 1918, which remind the memorial desk there.

The Headquarters of Carpathian Biosphere Reserve are located in Rakhiv.

With an elevation of 430 meters above sea level, Rakhiv is Ukraine's highest city.

=== Climate ===
The climate in Rakhiv is a mild/cool summer subtype (Köppen: Dfb) of the humid continental climate.

Climate data for Rakhiv
Month	Jan	Feb	Mar	Apr	May	Jun	Jul	Aug	Sep	Oct	Nov	Dec	Year
Daily mean °C (°F)	−4.2 (24.4)	−2.1 (28.2)	2.6 (36.7)	8.4 (47.1)	13.4 (56.1)	16.4 (61.5)	17.9 (64.2)	17.4 (63.3)	13.7 (56.7)	8.6 (47.5)	3.0 (37.4)	−1.6 (29.1)	7.8 (46.0)
Average precipitation mm (inches)	44 (1.7)	40 (1.6)	40 (1.6)	57 (2.2)	83 (3.3)	105 (4.1)	94 (3.7)	79 (3.1)	51 (2.0)	43 (1.7)	49 (1.9)	56 (2.2)	741 (29.1)
Source: Climate-Data.org

== Twin town ==
- Bielsk Podlaski, Poland
- Szeged, Hungary

== Notable people ==
- Mickola Vorokhta, the Ukrainian artist was born here.
- Bonkáló Sándor/Alexander Bonkáló, Rusyn-Hungarian linguist and slavicist was born here
- István Altorjay, the first full professor of pediatric surgery of Hungary was born here

== Gallery ==
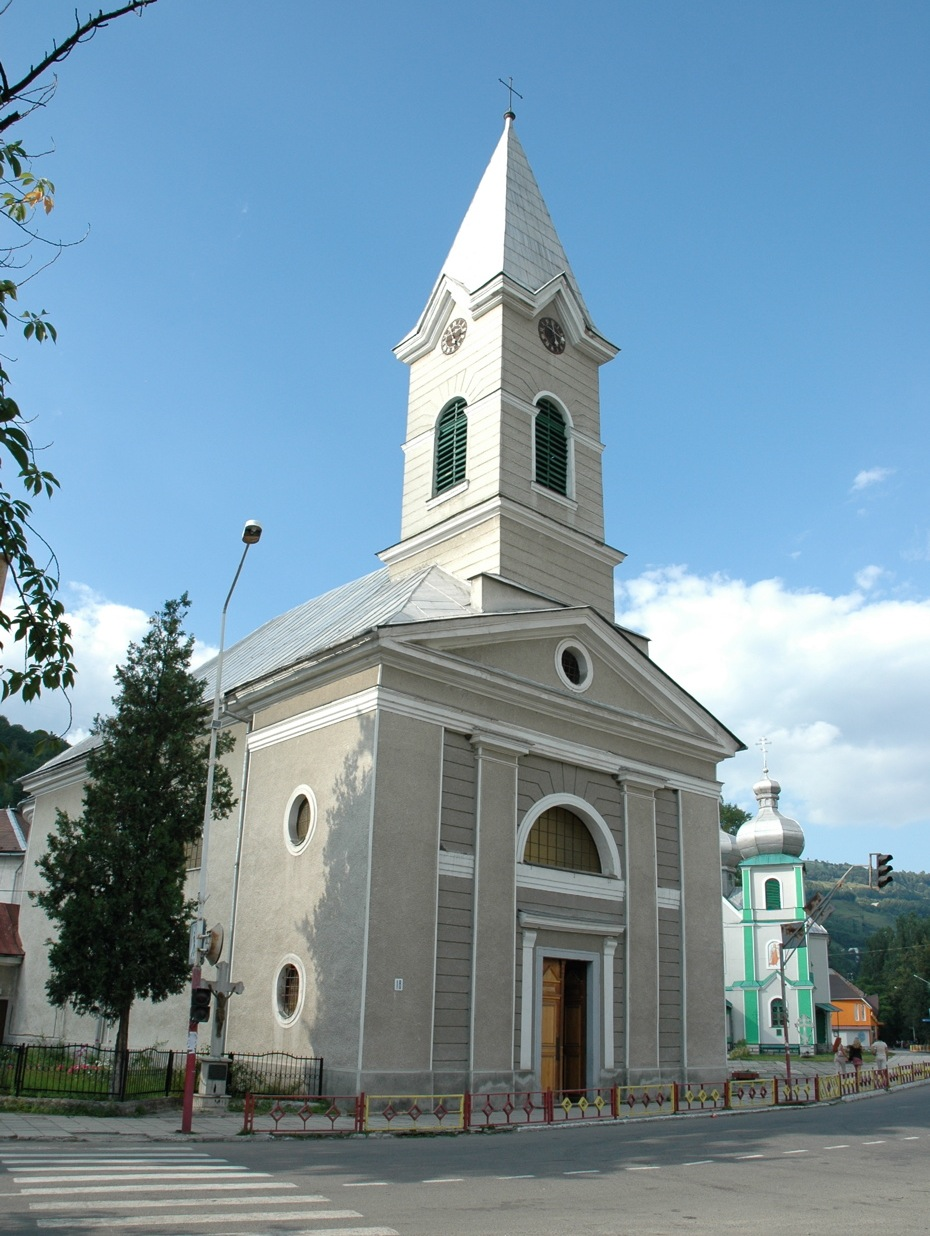
Church of Saint John Nepomucene

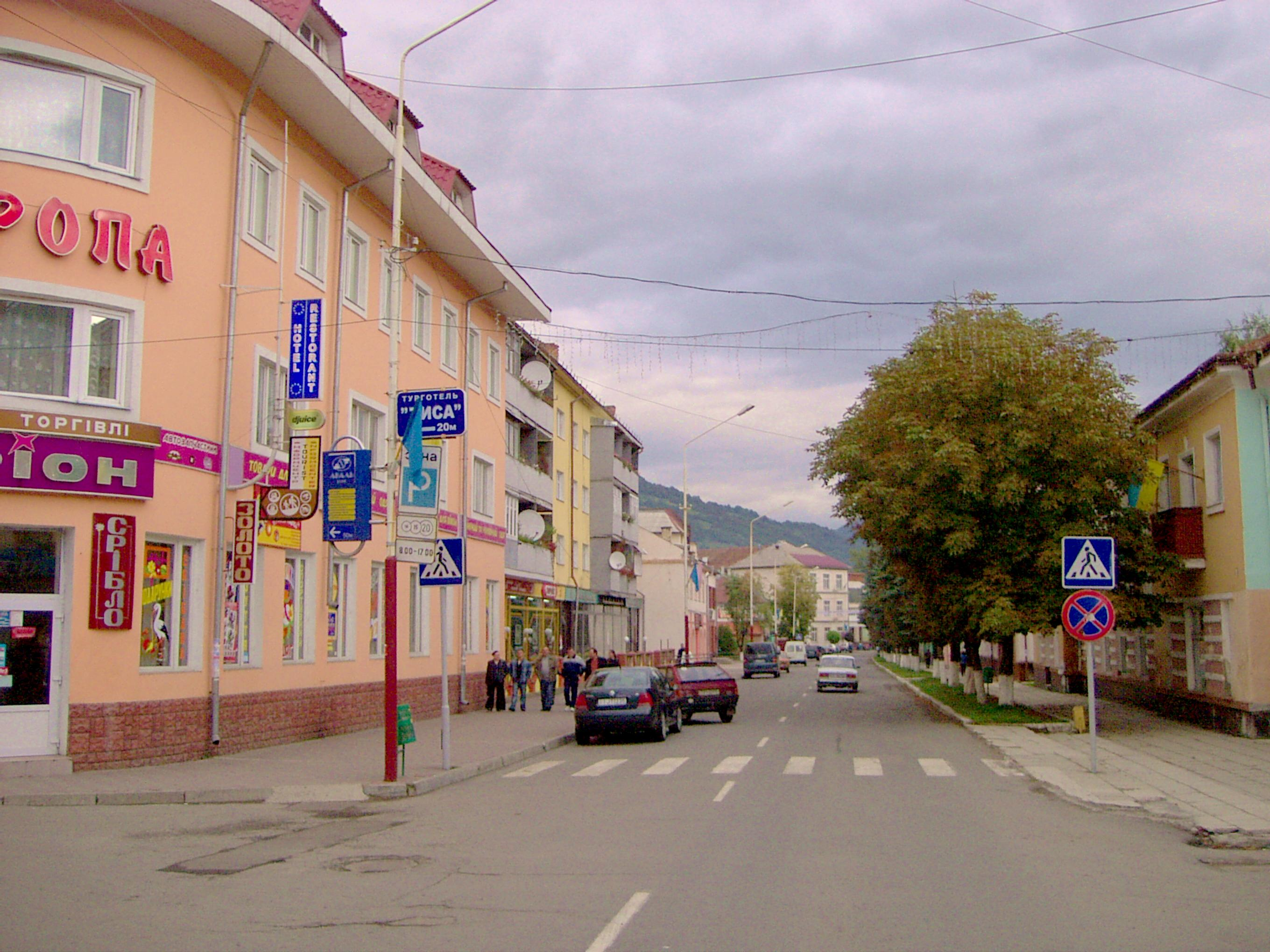
Hotel Europa

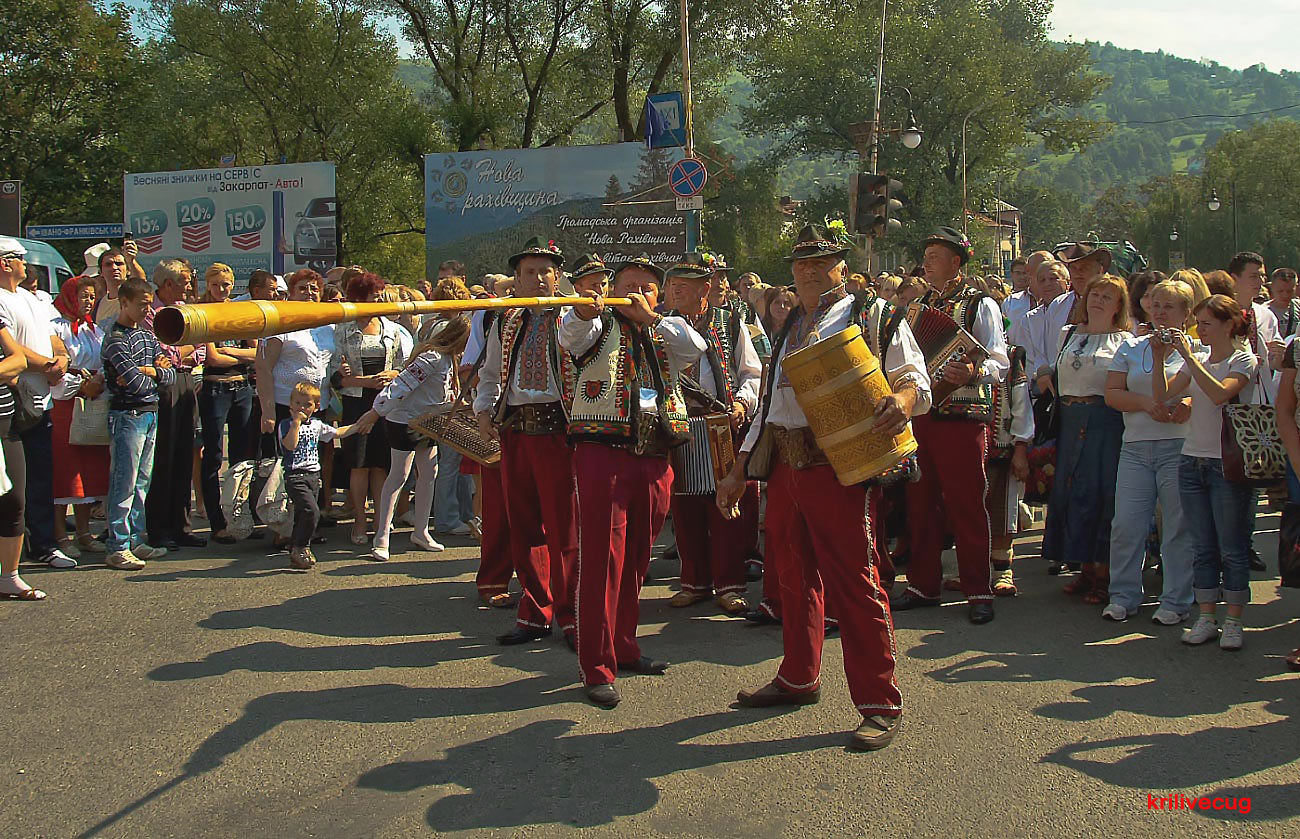
Hutsul festival in Rakhiv
