= Valley of Narcissi =

Nature reserve in Zakarpattia Oblast, Ukraine

- Ukrainian: Долина нарцисів
- IUCN category Ia (strict nature reserve)
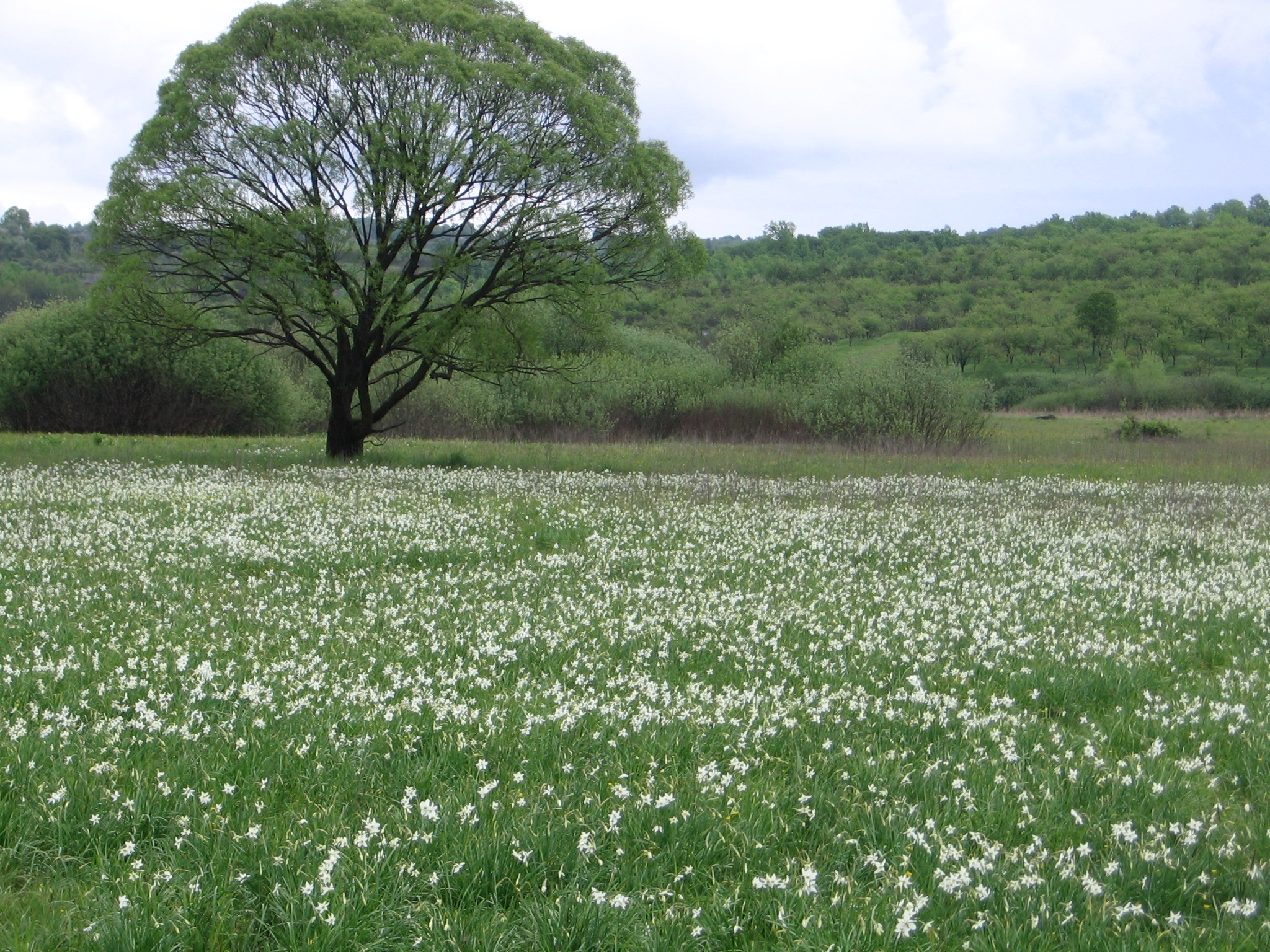

- Location within Zakarpattia Oblast
- Location: Kireshi, Zakarpattia Oblast, Ukraine
- Nearest city: Khust
- Coordinates: 48°10′42″N 23°20′59″E
- Area: 256 ha (630 acres)

The Valley of Narcissi (Ukrainian: Долина нарцисів) is a nature reserve in Kireshi, Zakarpattia Oblast, Ukraine. Part of the Carpathian Biosphere Reserve, it has an area of 256 ha (630 acres).
