= Hoverla, Zakarpattia Oblast =

Village in Zakarpattia Oblast, Ukraine

Hoverla Говерла
- Village
- Interactive map of Hoverla
- Location in Zakarpattia Oblast Location in Ukraine
- Country: Ukraine
- Oblast: Zakarpattia Oblast
- Raion: Rakhiv Raion
- Elevation: 690 m (2,260 ft)

Population (2001)
  - Total: 380
- Time zone: UTC+2 (EET)
  - Summer (DST): UTC+3 (EEST)

Hoverla (Ukrainian: Говерла) is a village located in Rakhiv Raion of Zakarpattia Oblast in western Ukraine.

== Demographics ==
According to the 1989 census, the population of Hoverla was 333 people, of whom 160 were men and 173 were women. According to the 2001 census, 380 people lived in the village.

Native language as of the Ukrainian Census of 2001:

Language	Percentage
Ukrainian	99.21 %
Russian	0.53 %
Hungarian	0.26 %
