= Dilove =

Village in Zakarpattia Oblast, Ukraine

Dilove Ділове
- Village
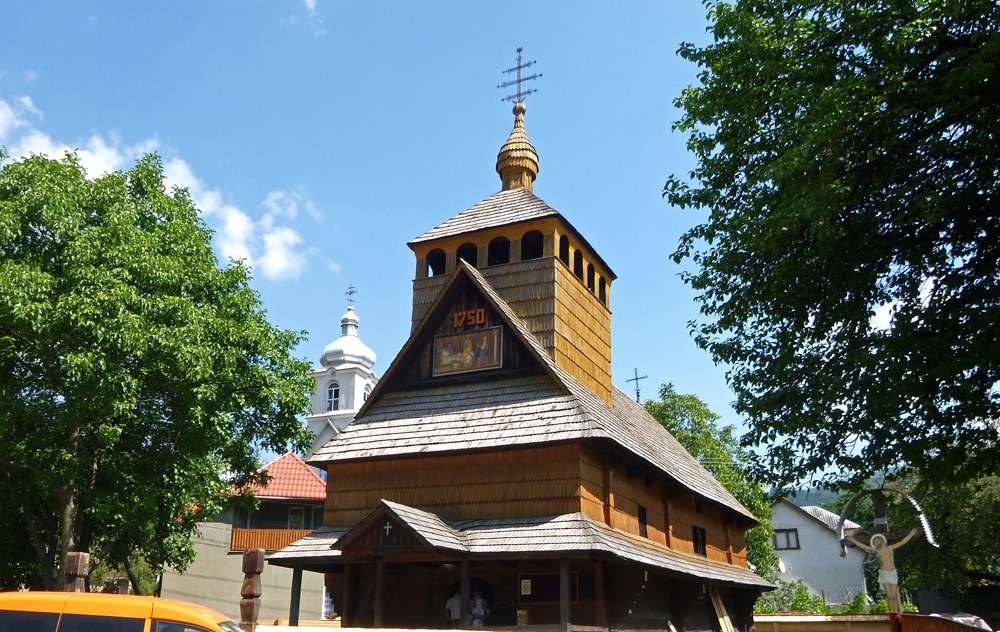
- Church of the Assumption

- Location in Zakarpattia Oblast Location in Ukraine
- Country: Ukraine
- Oblast: Zakarpattia Oblast
- Raion: Rakhiv Raion
- Hromada: Rakhiv urban hromada

Population (2006)
  - Total: 2,673
- Time zone: UTC+2 (EET)
  - Summer (DST): UTC+3 (EEST)

Dilove (Ukrainian: Ділове; Czech: Trebušany; Hungarian: Terebesfejérpatak; Romanian: Trebușeni; Rusyn: Дѣлове) is a village located in Rakhiv Raion of Zakarpattia Oblast in Ukraine.

There has been a marble quarry in the village since 1947.

== History ==
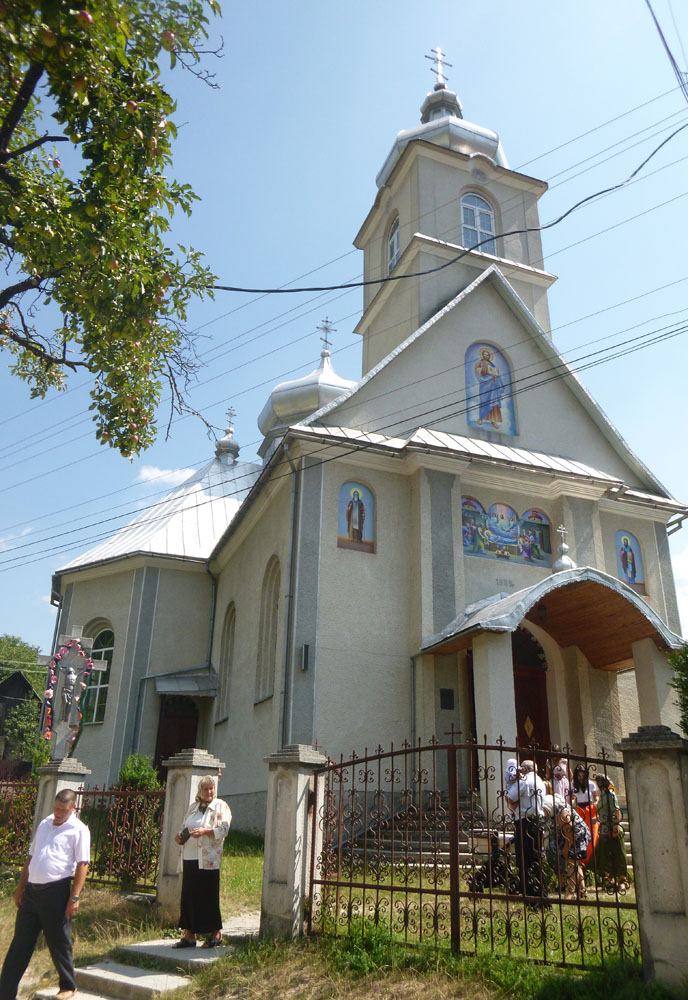
Church of the Blessed Virgin

Dilove was first mentioned in writing in 1615 and belonged to the Kingdom of Hungary until the Treaty of Trianon in 1920, then to Czechoslovakia until 1939. From March 1939 until the Soviet occupation in 1944, it was in Hungary, then in Czechoslovakia again and from 1946, the Ukrainian SSR. Since 1991, the village has been part of independent Ukraine. Until 25 June 1946 it bore the Romanian name Trebushany (Требушани), but was then renamed to its current name.

== Demographics ==
Native language as of the Ukrainian Census of 2001:

- Ukrainian 98.84%
- Russian 0.45%
- Hungarian 0.41%
- Moldovan (Romanian) 0.07%
- Romanian (self-declared) 0.07%
- Belarusian 0.04%

== Tourism ==
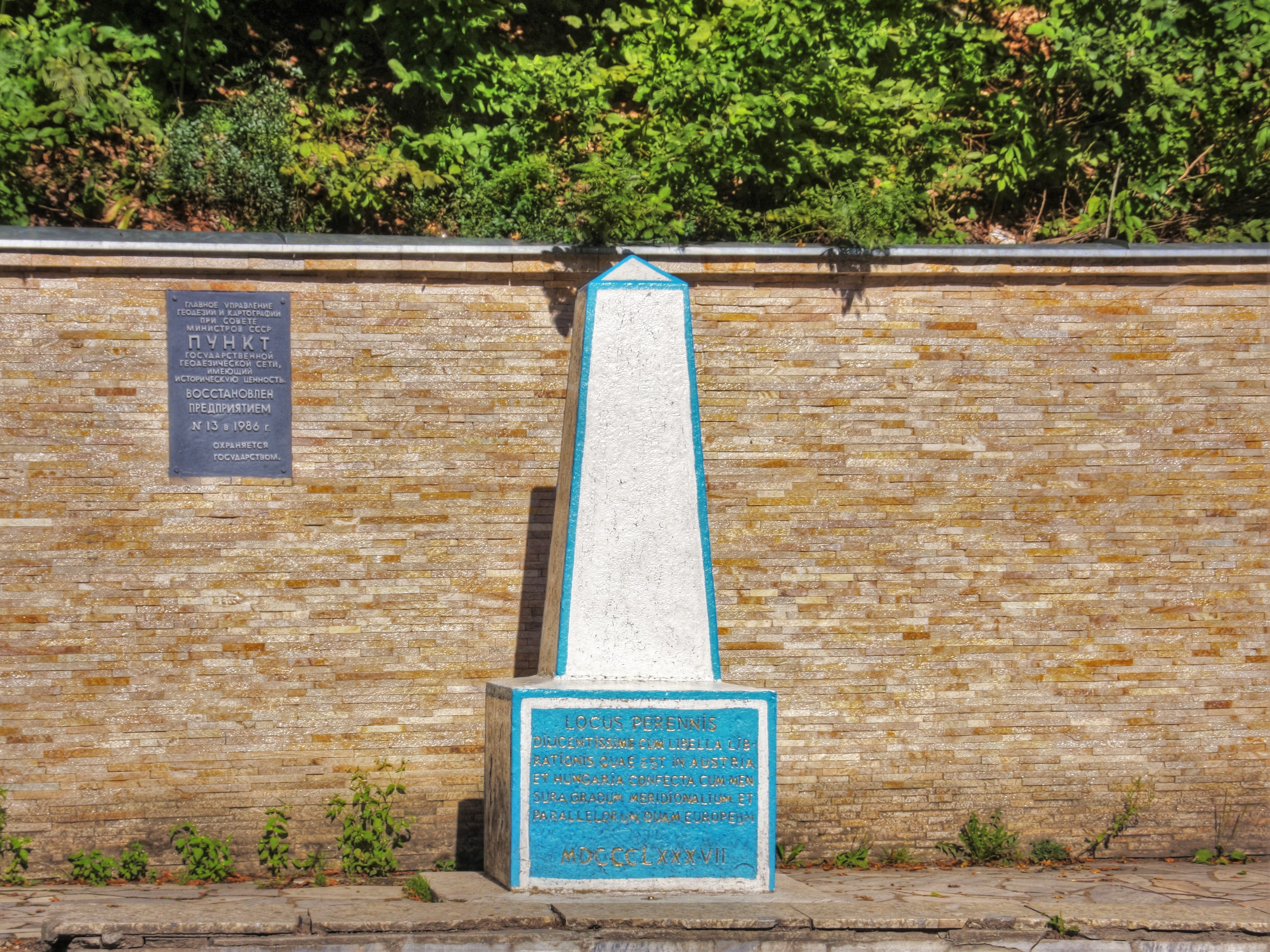
Austrian-Hungarian marker in Ukraine

Dilove gained notoriety through the 2 m high geodesic monument erected in 1887, a concrete obelisk, which, according to calculations by the Cartographic Institute of the Austro-Hungarian Monarchy, represents the geographical midpoint of Europe. A plaque on it has an inscription written in Latin.
