= Velykyi Bychkiv =

Rural locality in Zakarpattia Oblast, Ukraine

Velykyi Bychkiv Великий Бичків Великый Бичкôв (in Rusyn) Nagybocskó (in Hungarian) Bocicoiu Mare (in Romanian) Velký Bočkov (in Czech) Veľký Bočkov (in Slovak)
- Rural settlement
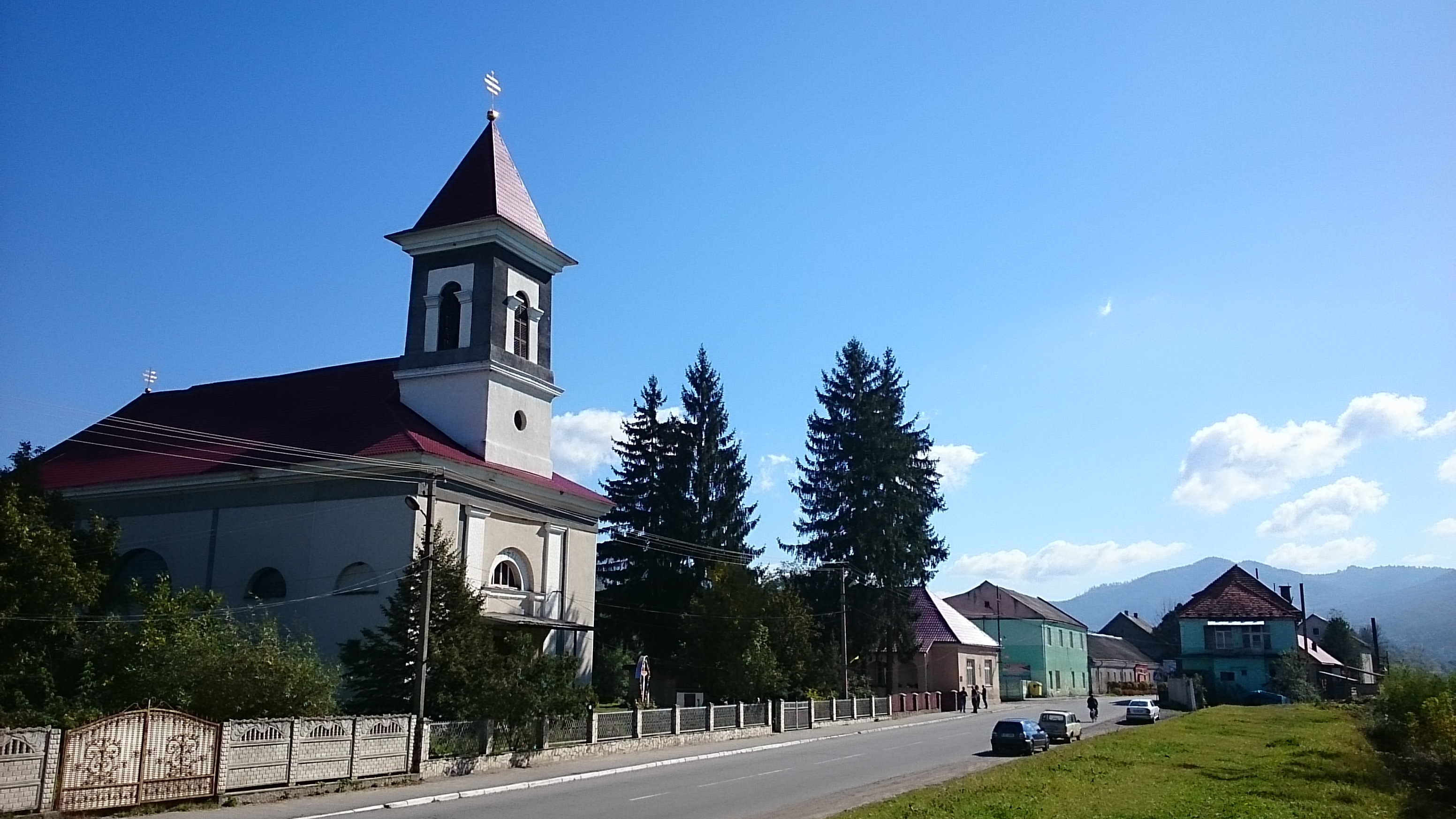
- Greek Catholic Church of the Assumption of the Blessed Virgin

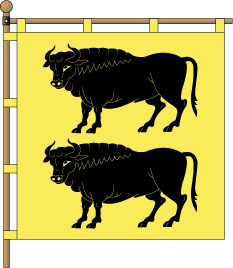
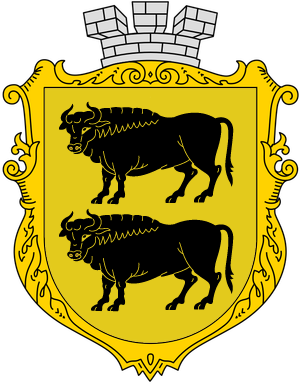
- Flag Coat of arms
- Interactive map of Velykyi Bychkiv
- Location within Zakarpattia Oblast Location within Ukraine
- Coordinates: 47.9667°N 24.015°E
- Country: Ukraine
- Oblast: Zakarpattia
- Raion: Rakhiv Raion
- Hromada: Velykyi Bychkiv settlement hromada
- First mentioned: 1358
- Urban-type settlement status: 1947

Government
  - Mayor: Iosif Bozhuk

Area
  - Total: 5.235 km^{2} (2.021 sq mi)
- Elevation: 307 m (1,007 ft)

Population (2022)
  - Total: 9,114
  - Density: 1,741/km^{2} (4,509/sq mi)
- Time zone: UTC+2 (EET)
  - Summer (DST): UTC+3 (EEST)
- Post code: 90615
- Area code: +380 3132
- Website: http://www.bychkiv.com.ua/index.php

Velykyi Bychkiv (Ukrainian: Вели́кий Бичкі́в; Rusyn: Великый Бичкôв; Hungarian: Nagybocskó, Nagybocska; Romanian: Bocicoiu Mare; Czech: Velký Bočkov; Slovak: Veľký Bočkov) is a rural settlement in Rakhiv Raion (district) of Zakarpattia Oblast (province) in western Ukraine. It belongs to Velykyi Bychkiv settlement hromada, one of the hromadas of Ukraine. Population: 9,114 (2022 estimate).

== Geography ==
Velykyi Bychkiv lies 36 kilometres (22 miles) east of Tiachiv, at the confluence of Sopurka River and Tisza River. It is located in the historical region of Hutsulshchyna.

== History ==
The village was first mentioned in 1358, by the name Buchku. Its name is derived from a Slavic word meaning "bull". Before 1556 Bosckai family owned the village. From 1556 it belonged to the Báthory family. By 1711 a mansion already stood here. After the failed revolution led by Francis II Rákóczi, Germans settled in the area. The village had three parts: Nagybocskó and Kisbocskó ("Greater" and "Smaller" Bocskó), which form today's Velykyy Bychkiv, and Németbocskó ("German Bocskó") across the river (this forms today's Bocicoiu Mare in Romania).

In 1910 the village had 5955 inhabitants: 3078 Ruthenians, 1646 Hungarians and 1177 Germans by the primary language, or 3374 Greek Catholic, 1266 Roman Catholic and 1163 Jewish people by religion. It belonged to the Hungarian county of Máramaros. After World War I it belonged to Czechoslovakia, where it was an important centre of the Ukrainian national movement. In 1939 it again became part of Hungary, before being ceded to the Ukrainian SSR in 1945.

Until 26 January 2024, Velykyi Bychki was designated urban-type settlement. On this day, a new law entered into force which abolished this status, and Velykyi Bychki became a rural settlement.

== Economy ==
Velykyi Bychkiv has a chemical, sulfuric acid and table salt factory, as well as a sawmill. In 1930 a forest railway line was built.

== People from Velykyi Bychkiv ==
- János Balogh, biologist, member of the Hungarian Academy of Sciences, was born here on 19 February 1903
- Ottó Korvin, politician, a founder of the Communist Workers' Party, was born here on 24 March 1894
- Theodore Romzha, Greek Catholic bishop of Mukačevo, was born here on 14 April 1911
- Ivan Yaremchuk, Ukrainian and Soviet football player, was born here on 13 September 1962
- Rose Weingarten, Holocaust survivor, was born here on 27 September 1918, while it was still part of Czechoslovakia
- Helen Gancz Zigmond, Holocaust survivor, was born here October 27, 1927 while it was still part of Czechoslovakia. Her family was transported during the Holocaust first to Auschwitz Birkenau death camp, and then Bergen Belsen, from which she was liberated in 1945. She married an American soldier and settled in Cheyenne, WY.
