= Carpathian Biosphere Reserve =

UNESCO biosphere reserve in Ukrainian Carpathian mountains

- Карпатський біосферний заповідник
- IUCN category Ia (strict nature reserve)
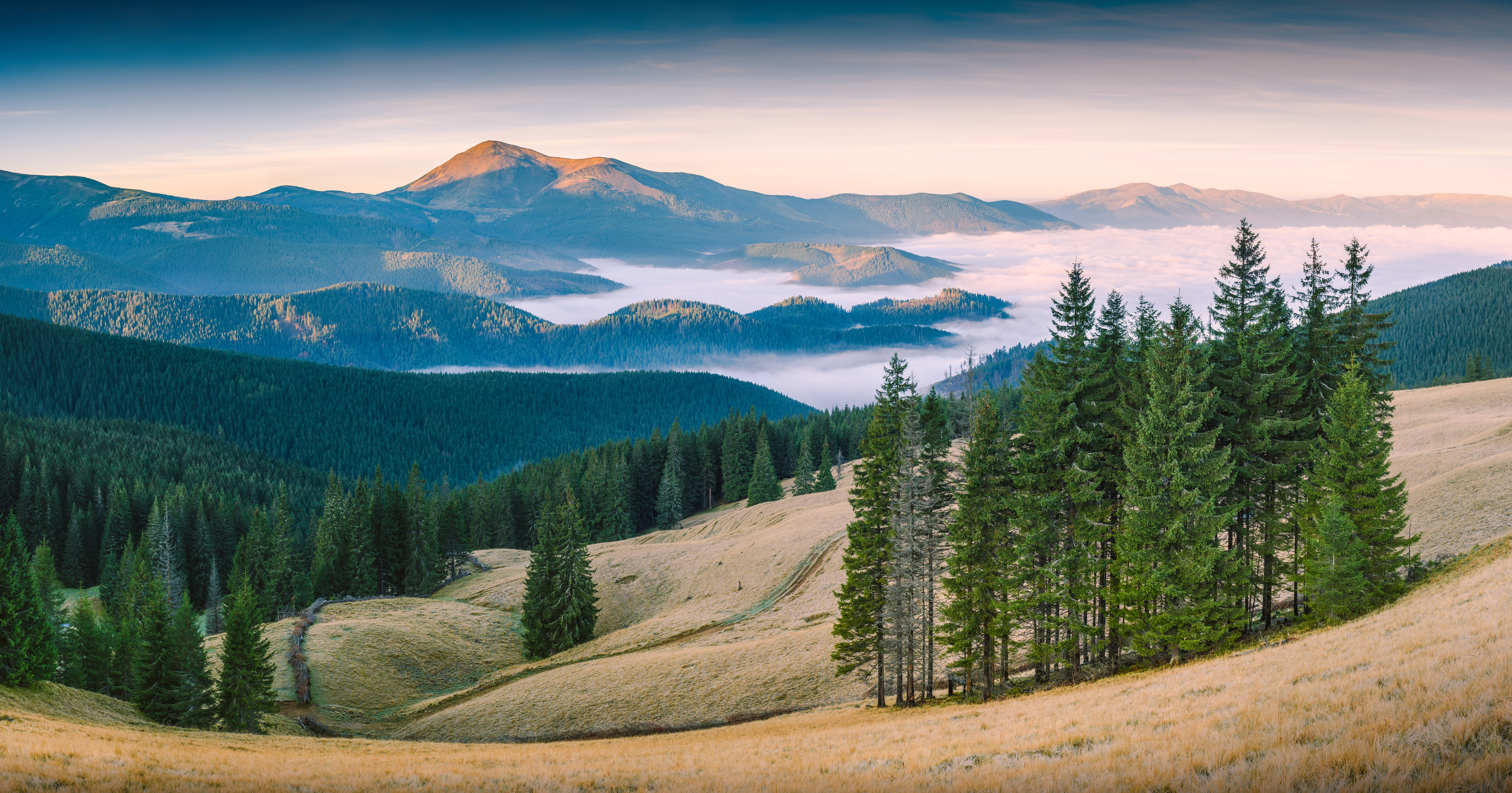
- Views of the Carpathian Biosphere Reserve Logo

- Location within Ukraine
- Location: Ukraine
- Coordinates: 48°08′N 23°49′E
- Area: 65,828 hectares (162,660 acres)
- Max. elevation: 2061 m a.s.l.
- Min. elevation: 180 m a.s.l.
- Established: 1968, 1992
- World Heritage site: 2007
- Website: https://kbz.in.ua/en

UNESCO World Heritage Site
- Official name: Ancient and Primeval Beech Forests of the Carpathians and Other Regions of Europe
- Criteria: Natural: ix
- Reference: 1133quinquies
- Inscription: 2007 (31st Session)

Carpathian Biosphere Reserve (Ukrainian: Карпатський біосферний заповідник) is a biosphere reserve in Ukraine that was established in 1968 and became part of the World Network of Biosphere Reserves of UNESCO in 1992. Since 2007 a significant portion of the reserve, along with some territories of the Uzh River National Park, was listed with the UNESCO World Heritage Sites as part of the Ancient and Primeval Beech Forests of the Carpathians and Other Regions of Europe.

Located in the eastern parts of the Zakarpattia Oblast, it consists of eight separate preservation massifs and two botanic zakazniks (Chorna Hora and Yulivska Hora) with a total area of 65,828 hectares (162,660 acres). The greatest part of the reserve is covered by virgin forests, including the largest massif of primeval beech forests in Europe in the Uholsko-Shyrokoluzhanskyi massif, covering over 21,000 hectares. Administratively, the biosphere reserve is located in four districts (Rakhiv, Tyachiv, Khust, and Berehiv) of Zakarpattia Oblast, Ukraine.

Two mountain ranges in the Ukrainian Carpathians, Borzhava and Svydovets, are protected under the Emerald Network of environmentally important conservation areas established by the Council of Europe. The Natura 2000 network standards apply there. It is adjacent to the Carpathian National Nature Park.

== History ==
The nature reserve was established in 1968 and reorganized as a biosphere reserve in 1983, becoming part of the UNESCO World Network of Biosphere Reserves in 1992. In 2007, its beech forests were inscribed as a UNESCO World Heritage Site.

In 2010, Ukrainian President Viktor Yanukovych issued a decree to expand the reserve's territory, but the expansion was not legally finalized for many years due to opposition from local communities and lack of funding for boundary demarcation. Local communities expressed concerns about the loss of traditional land use rights, particularly for grazing and haymaking.

In 2025, as part of Ukraine's ongoing efforts to expand protected areas, the reserve's territory was officially increased by nearly 19,000 hectares, bringing the total area to approximately 65,828 hectares.

=== Humanitarian role during the Russo-Ukrainian war ===
Following the full-scale Russian invasion of Ukraine in February 2022, the Carpathian Biosphere Reserve, located in the relatively safe western part of Ukraine, played a significant humanitarian role. The reserve provided shelter for hundreds of internally displaced persons (IDPs) fleeing the war. The Frankfurt Zoological Society (FZS) provided support for preparing accommodation, as well as essential items including medicines, warm clothes, hygiene products, and food supplies.

The FZS continues to support the reserve's operations through various programs, including funding for equipment, vehicles, uniforms, and the renovation of the reserve's museum. The organization also assists with biodiversity monitoring using the Spatial Monitoring and Reporting Tool (SMART) system.

== Territory division ==
The territory of Carpathian Biosphere Reserve is divided into several functional zones: core (A) and buffer zones (B), zone of the regulated protected regime (D) and anthropogenic landscapes (C).

They differ one from another by the nature use regimes. Such division helps to achieve the most appropriate balance between nature protection needs and the requirements of local people.

== Composition ==
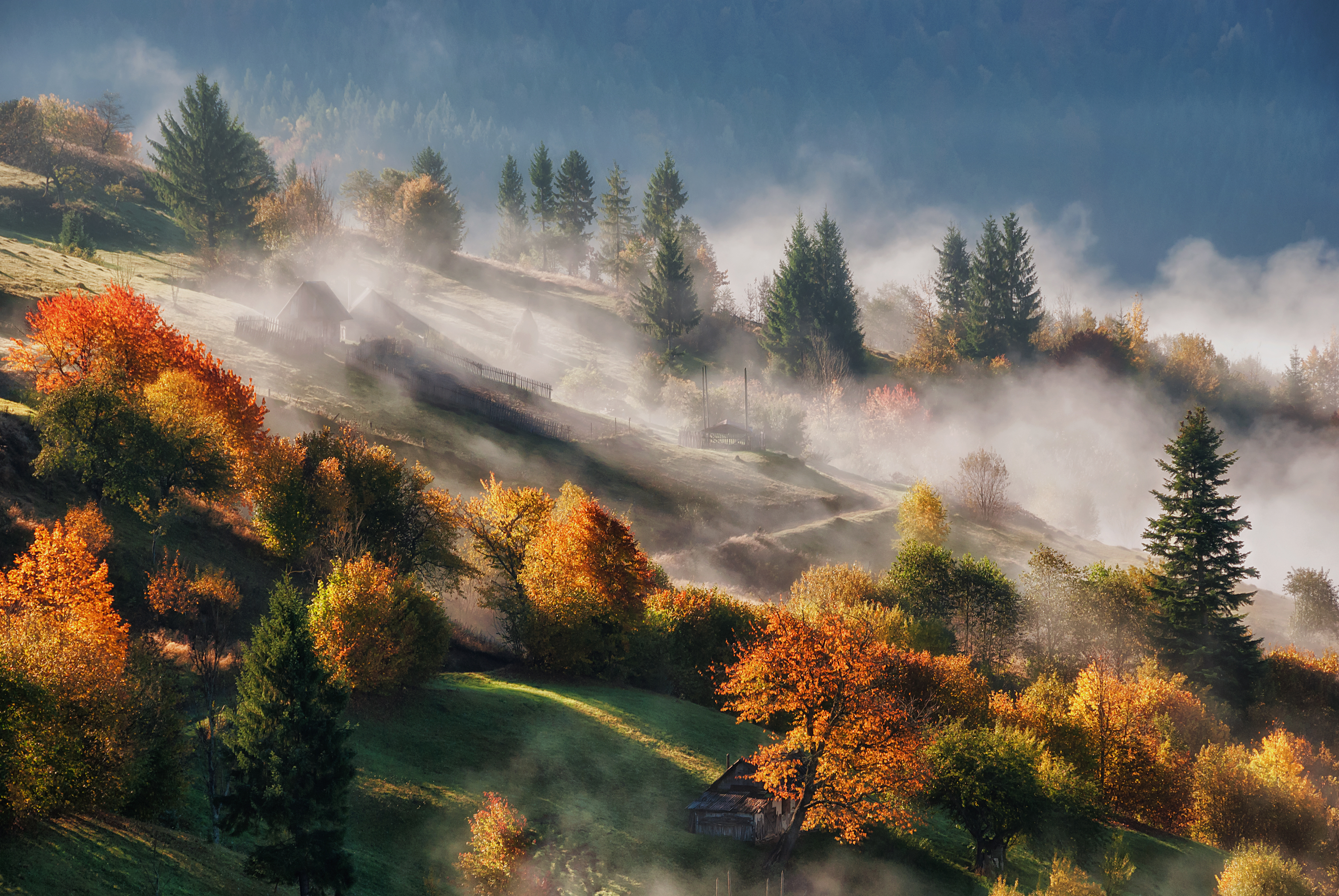
Autumn morning in the outskirts of Rakhiv

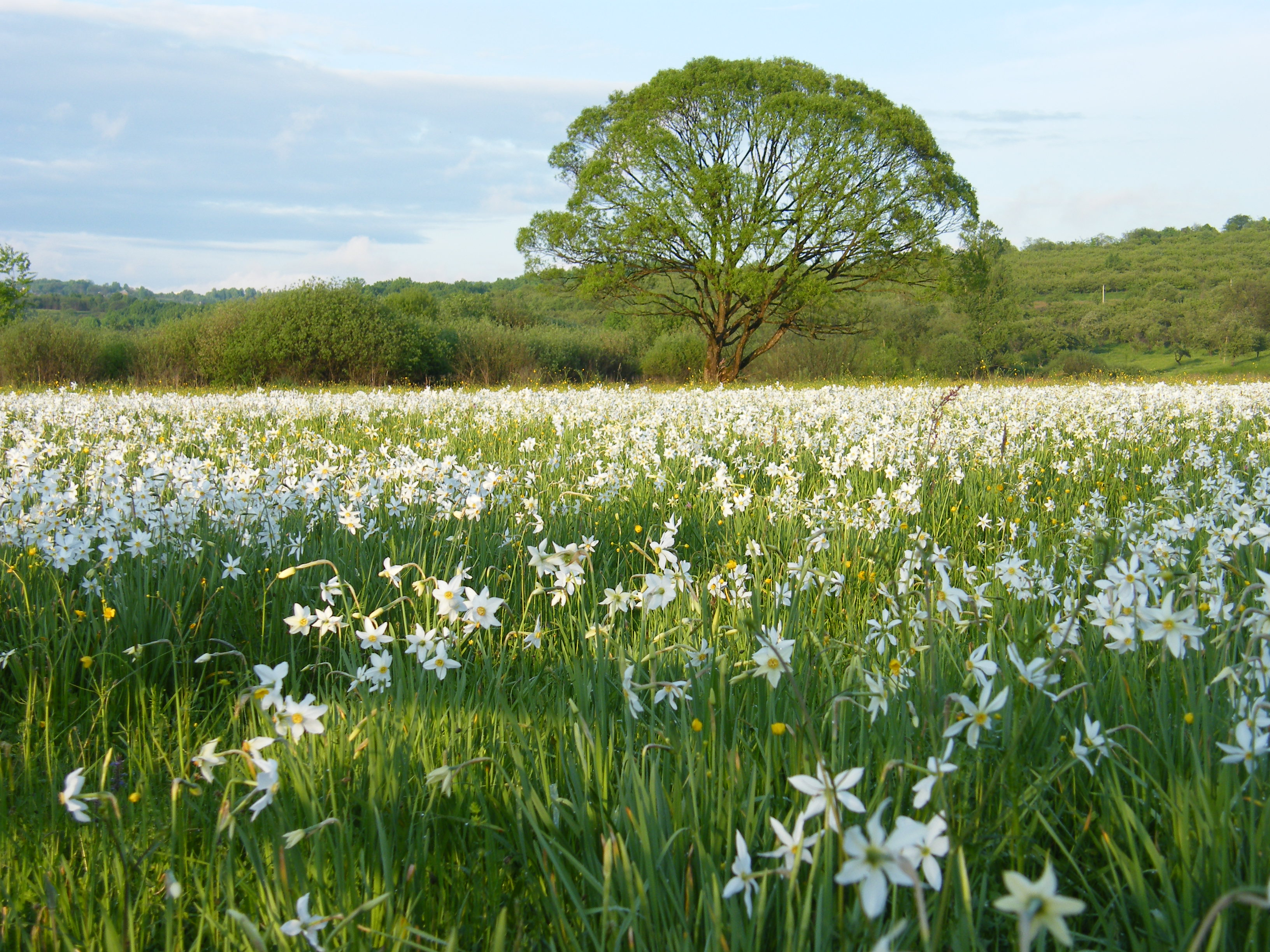
The Valley of Narcissi

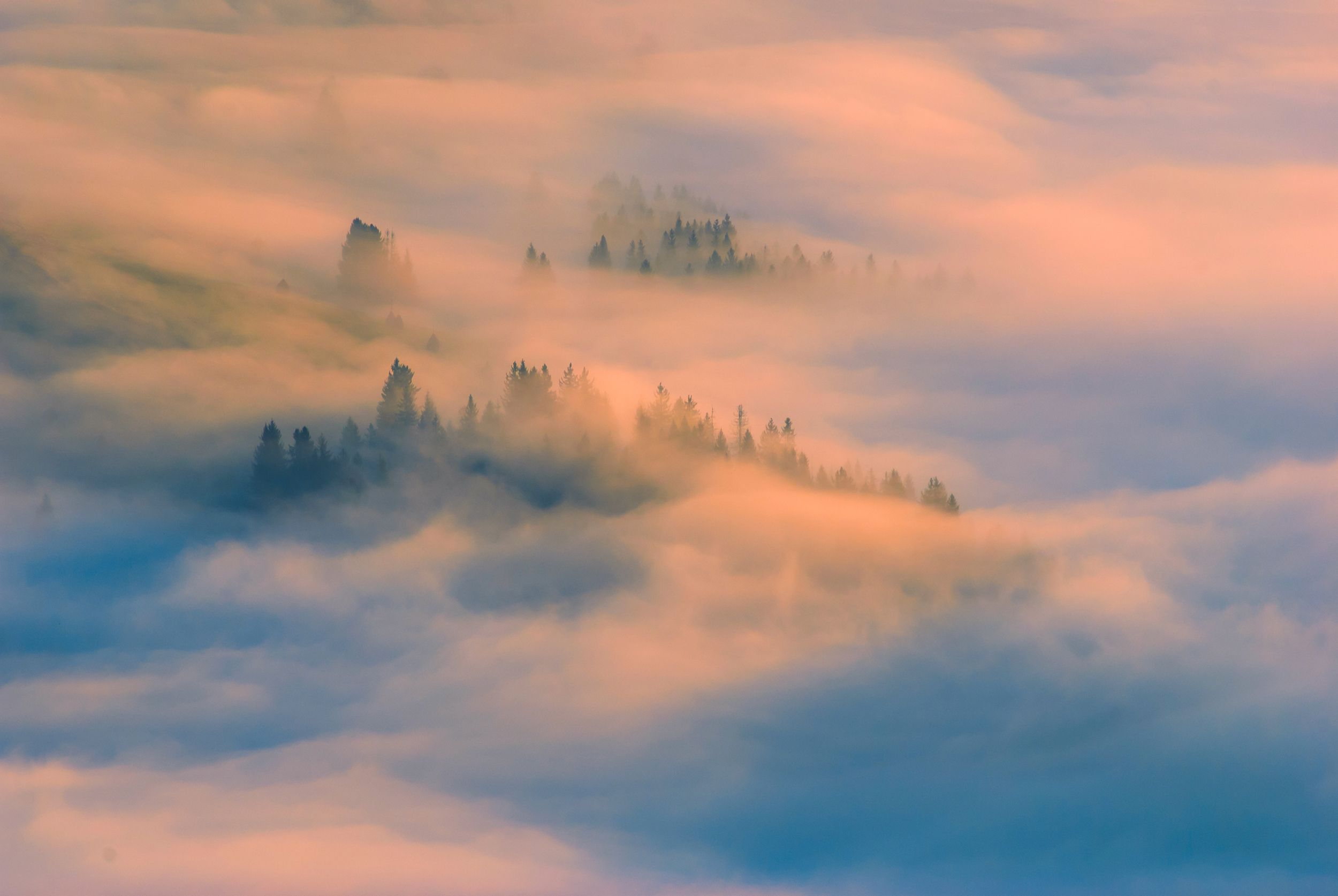
A sea of clouds

The biosphere reserve consists of eight separate preservation massifs as well as two botanical reserves (zakazniks).

- Chornohora preservation massif (16,375 ha) – located on the southern macroslope of the Chornohora, the highest mountain belt in the Eastern Beskids and the Ukrainian Carpathians
- Svydovets preservation massif (6,580 ha) – located at an elevation of 600–1883 m.a.s.l.; includes 3,031 ha of UNESCO World Heritage beech forests
- Marmorosh preservation massif (8,990 ha) – located on the northern macroslope of the Rakhiv Mountains at an elevation of 750–1940 m.a.s.l.
- Kuziy preservation massif (4,925 ha) – located on the southern branches of the Svydovets mountain range at an elevation of 350–1409 m.a.s.l.
- Uholka and Shyroka Luzhanka preservation massif (15,580 ha) – located on the southern slopes of the Krasna and the Menchil mountains; contains the largest massif of primeval beech forests in Europe
- Preservation massif "Dolyna Nartsysiv" (Valley of Narcissi) – located at an elevation of 180–200 m.a.s.l. in the western part of Khustsko-Solotvynska Valley
- Botanical zakaznyk "Chorna Hora" (Black Mountain) (823 ha) – established in 1974 to preserve oak, hornbeam-oak, oak-beech and beech-oak forests; became part of the reserve in 1997
- Botanical zakaznyk "Yulivska Hora" (Julius Mountain) (176 ha) – established in 1974, became part of the reserve in 1997; characterized by the warmest climate in the Ukrainian Carpathians and preserves heat-loving Balkan and Mediterranean species

== Flora and fauna ==
The flora of CBR consists of 262 fungi species, 392 species of lichens, 440 species of mosses and 1,353 species of vascular plants, with 3,022 total plant species recorded in the reserve. The algal flora includes 465 species. 197 plant species, including fungi, are listed in the Red Book of Ukraine, the European Red Lists, and the International Red Book.

The fauna of the Carpathian biosphere reserve is represented by 66 mammal species, 195 birds, 9 reptiles, 14 amphibians, 29 fish and one cyclostomatous species, as well as approximately 15,000 invertebrate species. 248 animal species are listed in the Red Book of Ukraine, the European Red Lists, and the International Red Book. The reserve supports viable populations of large carnivores such as wolf, lynx and brown bear. All ten woodpecker species of European deciduous forests are represented in the Svydovets massif.

The biosphere reserve has been designated an Important Bird Area (IBA) by BirdLife International for its populations of B2 and B3 species.

== Threats and controversies ==
=== Svydovets Ski Resort ===
The Svydovets massif has been at the center of a long-running conflict between conservationists and investors proposing to develop a large ski resort in the area. The project, initiated by companies linked to Ukrainian oligarch Igor Kolomoisky, would involve the construction of three interconnected ski resorts (Svydovets, Bystrytsia, and Turbat) designed to host over 58,000 people, potentially affecting up to 2,800 hectares of forests and alpine meadows, including up to 1,270 hectares of high conservation value forests.

Opponents of the project include the Swiss foundation Bruno Manser Fonds (BMF) and the Ukrainian grassroots initiative Free Svydovets Group, who argue that the development would permanently damage one of Europe's last pristine wilderness areas, increase the risk of floods, disrupt water supplies, and endanger local livelihoods. In March 2023, Ukrainian environmental NGOs submitted an application to establish the "Free Svydovets" landscape reserve of national importance, supported by more than 25,000 Ukrainian citizens in an official petition.

Proponents of the development argue it would bring economic growth, investment, and job creation to the region.

=== Illegal logging ===
Like other protected areas in Ukraine, the Carpathian Biosphere Reserve faces threats from illegal logging, a problem that has been exacerbated by the ongoing war. The reserve's forests are affected by destructive logging, with the planned ski resort infrastructure also posing a significant threat to forest cover.

== Socio-economic context ==
The reserve plays a significant role in the livelihoods of local communities. Local people are the main agricultural land users, with many engaged in small-scale cattle and sheep grazing on alpine meadows (polonynas). Traditional sheep products still play an important role in many villages. Utilization rights and guaranteed access to grazing areas are crucial to most inhabitants. The local population also depends on wood for heating and construction. High unemployment rates mean many locally employed people work in the forestry sector, with additional income generated from small-scale tourism, fishing, and the sale of non-timber forest products.
