= Rakhiv Raion =

Subdivision of Zakarpattia Oblast, Ukraine

Rakhiv Raion Рахівський район
- Raion
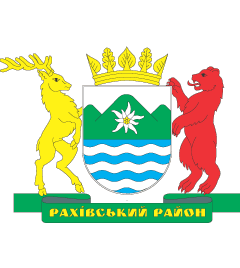
- Flag Coat of arms

- Coordinates: 48°3′24.72″N 24°11′48.35″E
- Country: Ukraine
- Oblast: Zakarpattia Oblast
- Established: 1945
- Admin. center: Rakhiv
- Subdivisions: 4 hromadas

Area
  - Total: 1,845.2 km^{2} (712.4 sq mi)

Population (2022)
  - Total: 82,034
  - Density: 44.458/km^{2} (115.15/sq mi)
- Time zone: UTC+02:00 (EET)
  - Summer (DST): UTC+03:00 (EEST)
- Area code: +380-3132
- Website: rakhiv-rda.gov.ua

Rakhiv Raion (Ukrainian: Рахівський район; Romanian: Raionul Rahău; Hungarian: Rahói járás) is a raion in Zakarpattia Oblast in western Ukraine. Its administrative center is Rakhiv. Population: 82,034 (2022 estimate).

On 18 July 2020, as part of the administrative reform of Ukraine, the number of raions of Zakarpattia Oblast was reduced to six. The January 2020 estimate of the raion population was 92,543 (2020 est.).

== Administrative division ==
Number of settlements 26. Number of cities ― 1. Rakhiv Raion includes 4 territorial communities.

City: Rakhiv (Rahó, Rachov between 1920–1938 and 1944–1945)

Urban-type settlements:

- Kobyletska Poliana (Gyertyánliget, Poľana Kobilská)
- Velykyi Bychkiv (Nagybocskó, Veľký Bočkov)
- Yasinia (Kőrösmező, Jasyna)

Villages:

- Bilyn (Bilin, Bilina)
- Bila Tserkva (Tiszafejéregyház, Bilá Cirkev)
- Bohdan (Tiszabogdány, Bila Tisa)
- Breboia (Bértelek, Preboja)
- Chorna Tysa (Feketetisza, Mogelki (between 1920–1938), Černá Tisa (1944–1945))
- Dilove (Terebesfejérpatak, Trebušany)
- Dobrik (Dobrikdülő, Dobrik)
- Hoverla (Hóvár, Hoverla)
- Khmeliv (Komlós, Chmely)
- Kosivska Poliana (Kaszómező, Kosovská Poľana)
- Kostylivka (Barnabás, Berlebaš)
- Kruhlyi (Körtelep, Kruhlý)
- Kvasy (Tiszaborkút, Kvásy)
- Lazeshchyna (Mezőhát, Lazeština)
- Luhy (Láposmező, Luhy)
- Luh (Tizsalonka, Luh)
- Plaiuts (Plajuc, Gandal)
- Rosishka (Rászócska, Rosuška)
- Roztoky (Nyilas, Rostoka)
- Sitnyi (Szitni, Sitný)
- Serednie Vodiane (Középapsa, Stredná Apša)
- Stebnyi (Dombhát, Stebna)
- Strymba (Almáspatak, Strimba)
- Trostianets (Trosztyanec, Trsťenec)
- Verkhnie Vodiane (Felsőapsa, Vyšná Apša)
- Vilkhovatyi (Kiscserjés, Vilchovatý)
- Vodytsia (Kisapsa, Apšica)
- Vydrychka (Vidráspatak, Vydryčka)

Note: The Hungarian names of places are given in parentheses at first. The Slovakian names of these settlements were valid between 1920–1938 and 1944–1945.

== Geography ==
Rakhiv Raion is located in the highest part of the Ukrainian Carpathians. In the north of the district there are the Gorgany mountains, in the west - Svydovets, in the northeast - Chornohora, in the south - Rakhiv Mountains Rakhiv Mountains. In the Chornohora massif, the highest peak of Ukraine is located - Mount Hoverla (2061 m above sea level). The relief of the highlands shows signs of ancient glaciation - cirque and trough valleys.

The area of the district is 1 845.2 km^{2}.

The climate in Rakhiv district is moderately continental. The average temperature in January is -4.8 °C and in July +18.0 °C, and the average annual temperature is 7.4 °C. The average annual precipitation is 1212 mm, the maximum of which falls on June-July. With increasing altitude above sea level, the air temperature decreases and the amount of precipitation increases.

One of the largest tributaries of the Danube, the Tisza River, originates in the Rakhiv District. 82 mineral water springs have also been explored in the district.

Rakhiv Raion contains the following mineral deposits: gold, dolomite, marble, and mineral waters.

The Carpathian Biosphere Reserve is located in the Rakhiv district. The unique virgin forests and high-altitude meadows of this reserve belong to the most valuable ecosystems on the planet and are part of the UNESCO International Network of Biosphere Reserves. This territory is home to large predators such as the bear, wolf, and lynx.

== Demographics ==
In the 2001 census, the population of Rakhiv Raion was 90,900 which included:

- 83.8% Ukrainians (76,200)
- 3.2% Hungarians (2,900)
- 11.6% Romanians (10,500)
- 0.8% Russians (800)

According to the 2001 census, the majority of the Rahău district's population spoke Ukrainian (84.63%), with Romanian (11.59%) and Hungarian (2.48%) speakers in the minority.

== See also ==
- Administrative divisions of Zakarpattia Oblast

== Bibliography ==
- Національний атлас України/НАН України, Інститут географії, Державна служба геодезії, картографії та кадастру; голов. ред. Л. Г. Руденко; голова ред. кол.Б.Є. Патон. — К.: ДНВП «Картографія», 2007. — 435 с. — 5 тис.прим. — ISBN 978-966-475-067-4.
- Географічна енциклопедія України : [у 3 т.] / редкол.: О. М. Маринич (відповід. ред.) та ін. — К., 1989—1993. — 33 000 екз. — ISBN 5-88500-015-8.
- Воропай, Л.І., Куниця, М.О. (1966). Українські Карпати: Фізико-географічний нарис. Київ : Радянська школа, 167.
