= Nyzhnia Rozhanka =

Village in Lviv Oblast, Ukraine

Nyzhnia Rozhanka Нижня Рожанка
- Village
- Location within Lviv Oblast
- Coordinates: 48°49′10″N 23°30′23″E
- Country: Ukraine
- Oblast: Lviv Oblast
- District: Stryi Raion
- Established: 1675

Area
  - Total: 1,883 km^{2} (727 sq mi)
- Elevation /(average value of): 759 m (2,490 ft)

Population
  - Total: 887
  - Density: 4,711/km^{2} (12,200/sq mi)
- Time zone: UTC+2 (EET)
  - Summer (DST): UTC+3 (EEST)
- Postal code: 82662
- Area code: +380 3251
- Website: село Нижня Рожанка^{(Ukrainian)}

Nyzhnia Rozhanka (Ukrainian: Ни́жня Рожа́нка, Polish: Rożanka Niżna) is a Carpathian village (selo) in Stryi Raion, Lviv Oblast, of Western Ukraine. It is located within the limits of the Eastern Beskids (Skole Beskids) in the southern part of the Lviv Oblast. Nyzhnia Rozhanka belongs to Slavske settlement hromada, one of the hromadas of Ukraine. The total area of the village is 18,83 km^{2} and its population is about 887 people. Local government is administered by Nyzhnorozhanska village council.

== Geography ==
The village is situated along the Rozhanka river, right tributary of the Opir River (Dniester river basin). Distance from the regional center Lviv is 139 kilometres (86 mi), 31 kilometres (19 mi) from the district center Skole, and 10 kilometres (6.2 mi) from the urban village Slavske.

At a distance of 13 kilometres (8.1 mi) are the ski lifts on the Trostyan mountain.

Mineral springs are located near the villages of Verkhnia Rozhanka and Nyzhnia Rozhanka.

== History and attractions ==
The village was first mentioned in the 13th century, although it was officially founded in 1675.

Until 18 July 2020, Nyzhnia Rozhanka belonged to Skole Raion. The raion was abolished in July 2020 as part of the administrative reform of Ukraine, which reduced the number of raions of Lviv Oblast to seven. The area of Skole Raion was merged into Stryi Raion.

The village has a Cultural Heritage monument in Ukraine: the wooden bell tower of the 19th-century Church of the Epiphany (N – 517).

== Literature ==
- Ukrainian: Історія міст і сіл УРСР : Львівська область. – К. : ГРУРЕ, 1968 р. Page 717
