= Volosianka, Lviv Oblast =

Village in Lviv Oblast, Ukraine

Volosianka Волосянка
- Village
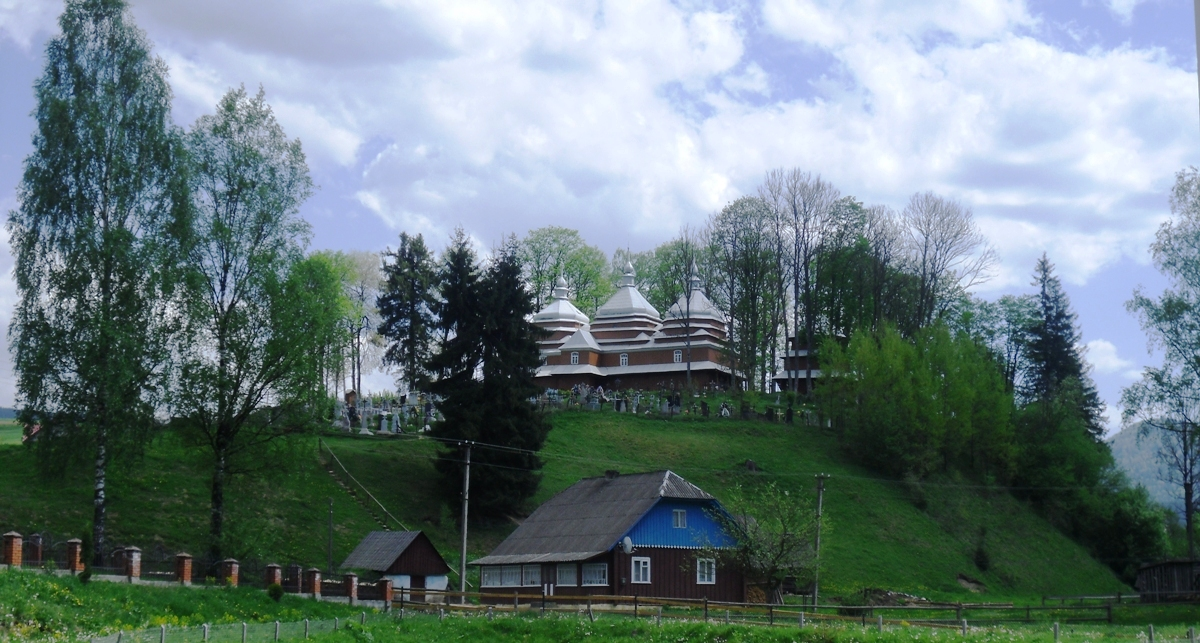

- Location within Lviv Oblast
- Coordinates: 48°46′48″N 23°25′42″E
- Country: Ukraine
- Oblast: Lviv Oblast
- District: Stryi Raion
- Established: 1572

Area
  - Total: 301 km^{2} (116 sq mi)
- Elevation /(average value of): 673 m (2,208 ft)

Population (2018)
  - Total: ▼1,297
  - Density: 48,239/km^{2} (124,940/sq mi)
- Time zone: UTC+2 (EET)
  - Summer (DST): UTC+3 (EEST)
- Postal code: 82663
- Area code: +380 3251
- Website: село Волосянка ^{(Ukrainian)}

Volosianka (Ukrainian: Волося́нка, Polish: Wołosianka) is a village (selo) in Stryi Raion, Lviv Oblast, of Western Ukraine. It is located in the Ukrainian Carpathians, within the limits of the Eastern Beskids. Volosianka belongs to Slavske settlement hromada, one of the hromadas of Ukraine. The population of village is 1297 persons. Local government – Volosiankivska village council. Volosiankivska village council includes village Khashchovania and Yalynkuvate.

The first written mention of Volosianka which dates from 1572.

Until 18 July 2020, Volosianka belonged to Skole Raion. The raion was abolished in July 2020 as part of the administrative reform of Ukraine, which reduced the number of raions of Lviv Oblast to seven. The area of Skole Raion was merged into Stryi Raion.

== Geography ==
Village are located in the valley of the rivers Slavka River and Yalynkuvata River. West of the village are the vertices Vysokyy Verh (1,242 metres (4,070 ft)), Plischka (1,032.2 metres (3,386 ft)), Mount Yarochysche (987 metres (3,240 ft)) and Mount Yalyna (1,164.5 metres (3,821 ft)). In the south is Mount Ilsa (1,064.5 metres (3,492 ft)).

The village Volosianka is situated in the 145 kilometres (90 mi) from the regional center Lviv, 36 kilometres (22 mi) from the district center Skole, and 10 kilometres (6.2 mi) from Slavske.

== Attractions ==
In this village there are an architectural monument of national importance. That is the wooden Church of the Holy Eucharist and a belfry.

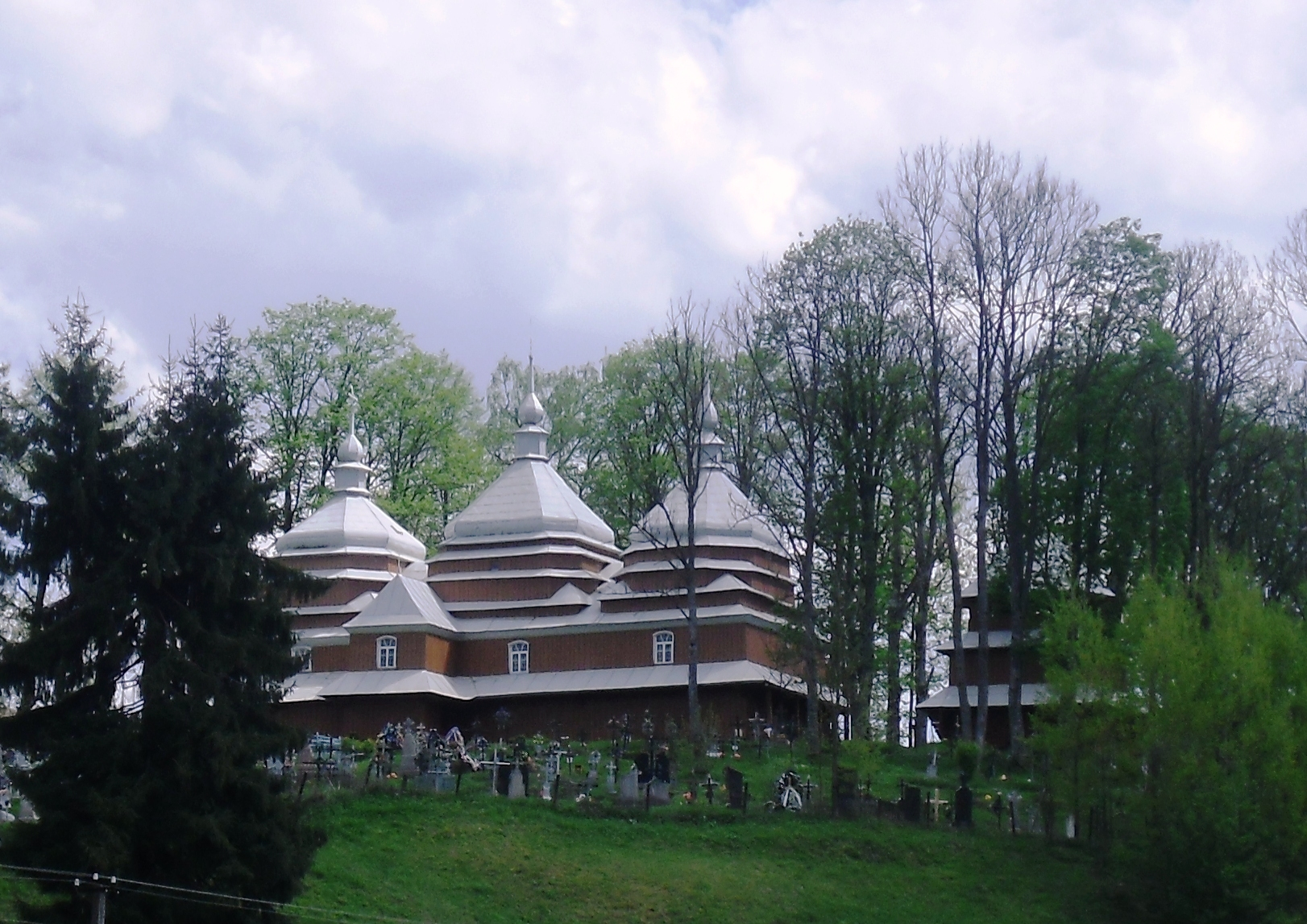
Church of the Holy Eucharist 1804 (wood)

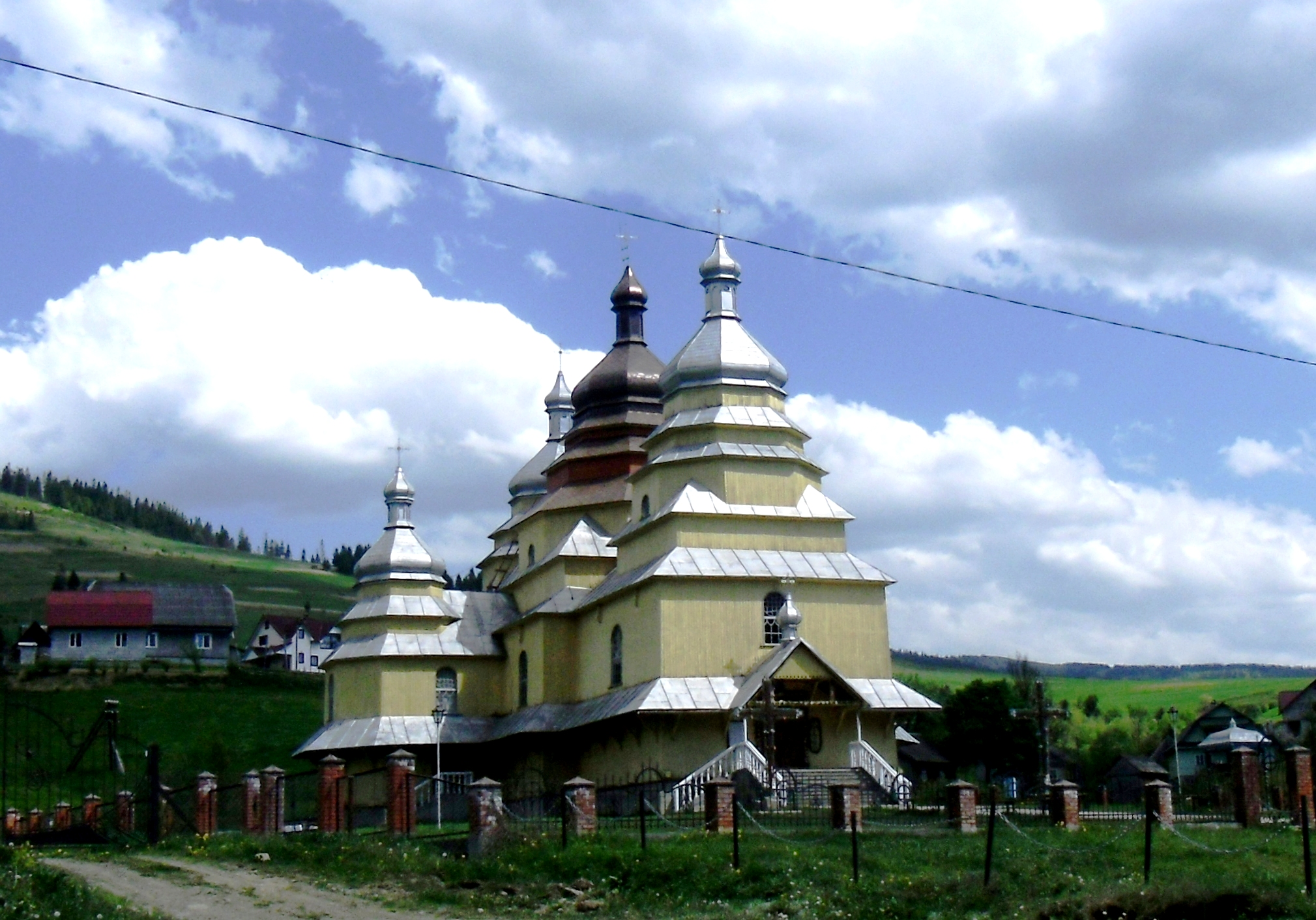
A newly built the temple of transfer St. Nicholas relics
