= Holovetsko =

Holovetsko (Ukrainian: Головецько) may refer to the following places in the Lviv Oblast of Ukraine:

- Holovetsko, Sambir Raion, Lviv Oblast, village in Sambir Raion
- Holovetsko, Stryi Raion, Lviv Oblast, village in Stryi Raion
