= Yalynkuvate =

Village in Lviv Oblast, Ukraine

Yalynkuvate Ялинкувате
- Village
- Location within Lviv Oblast
- Coordinates: 48°45′31″N 23°27′26″E
- Country: Ukraine
- Oblast: Lviv Oblast
- District: Stryi Raion
- Established: 1574

Area
  - Total: 161 km^{2} (62 sq mi)
- Elevation /(average value of): 774 m (2,539 ft)

Population
  - Total: 569
  - Density: 3.53/km^{2} (9.15/sq mi)
- Time zone: UTC+2 (EET)
  - Summer (DST): UTC+3 (EEST)
- Postal code: 82663
- Area code: +380 3251
- Website: село Ялинкувате ^{(Ukrainian)}

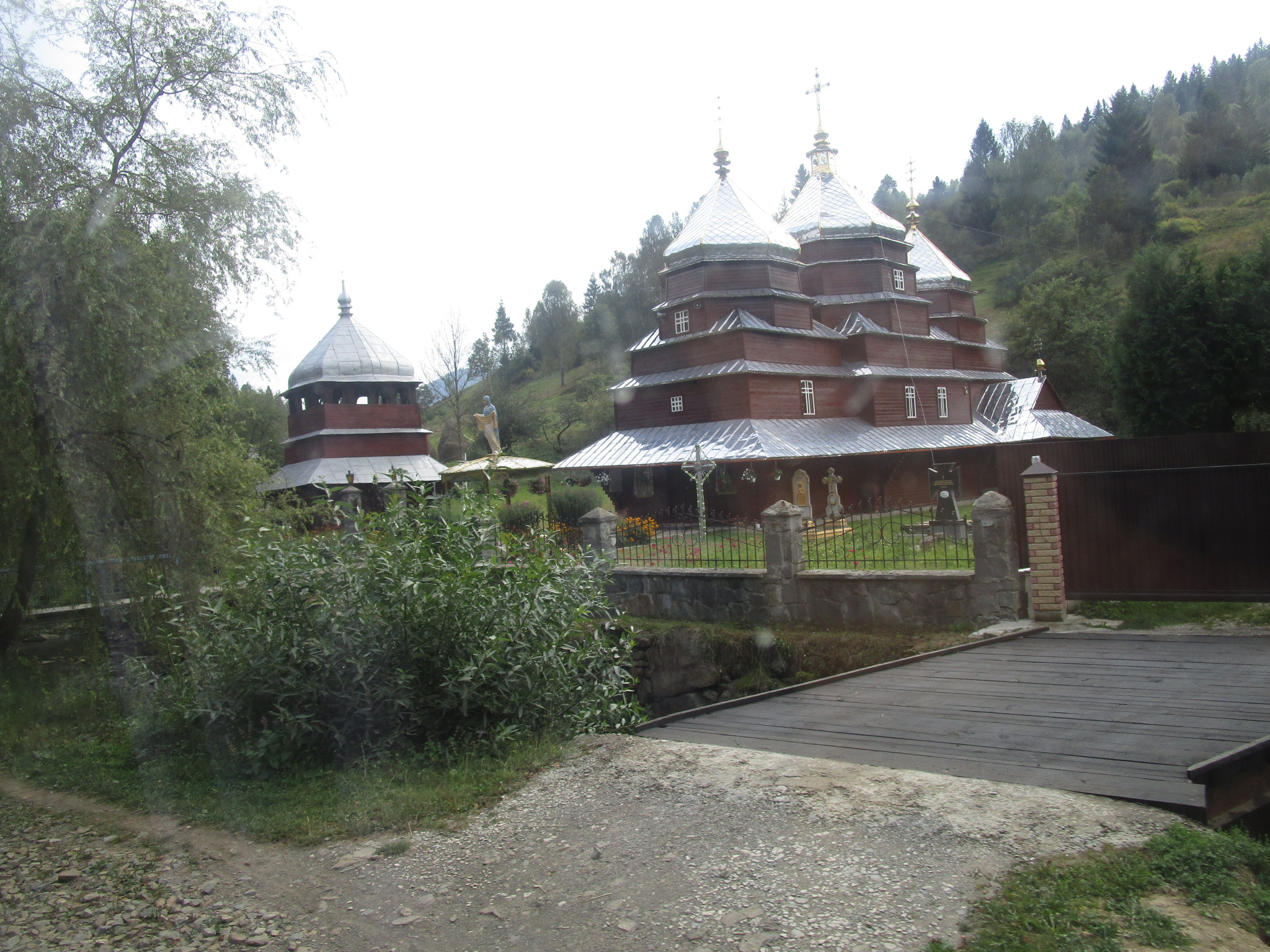
Church of the Intercession of the Virgin (der.) 1868, Yalinkuvate

Yalynkuvate (Ukrainian: Ялинкува́те, Polish: Jelenkowate) is a village in Stryi Raion, Lviv Oblast, of Western Ukraine on the border of the Zakarpattia Oblast. It belongs to the Slavske settlement hromada, one of the hromadas of Ukraine. The village has a population of 569 and its local government is administered by the Volosiankivska village council (village Volosyanka ).

== Geography ==
The village is located off the main roads, 148 kilometres (92 mi) from the regional center, Lviv, 40 kilometres (25 mi) from the district center, Skole, and 11 kilometres (6.8 mi) from the urban village, Slavske.

== History and attractions ==
The first record of the Yalynkuvate village dates back to 1574.

The village Yalynkuvate has two architectural monuments of Stryi Raion:

1. Church of the Intercession of the Virgin (wooden) 1868 (SN - 1422/1)
2. The bell tower of the church Intercession of the Virgin (wooden) 19th century. (SN - 1422/2)

Until 18 July 2020, Yalynkuvate belonged to Skole Raion. The raion was abolished in July 2020 as part of the administrative reform of Ukraine, which reduced the number of raions of Lviv Oblast to seven. The area of Skole Raion was merged into Stryi Raion.

== Literature ==
- Горак Р. Ялинкувате / Роман Горак // Радянська Верховина (Сколе). — 1990. (in Ukrainian)
