= Lavochne =

Village in Lviv Oblast, Ukraine

Lavochne Лавочне
- Village
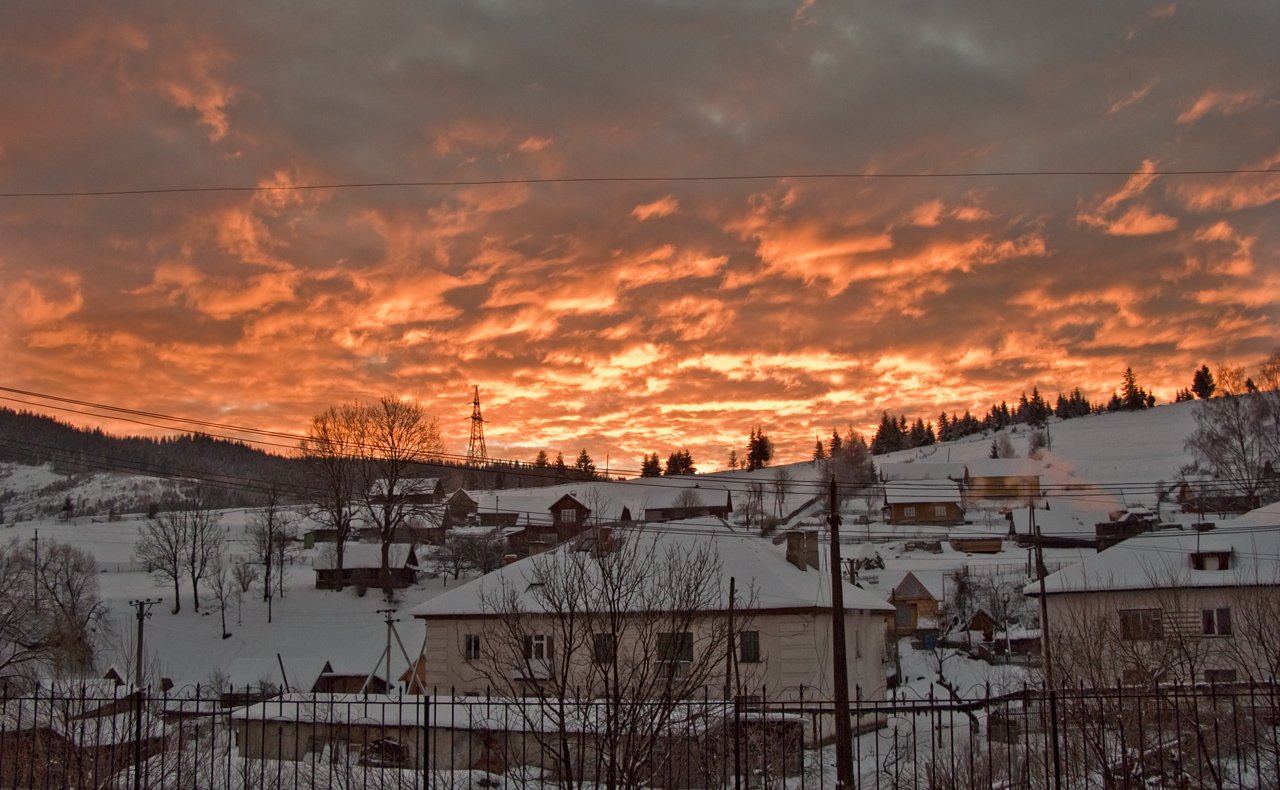
- View of Lavochne

- Location within Lviv Oblast Location within Ukraine
- Coordinates: 48°48′26″N 23°21′19″E
- Country: Ukraine
- Oblast: Lviv Oblast
- Raion: Stryi Raion
- Hromada: Slavsko settlement hromada
- Established: 1591

Area
  - Total: 264 km^{2} (102 sq mi)
- Elevation /(average value of): 663 m (2,175 ft)

Population
  - Total: 1,198
  - Density: 45,379/km^{2} (117,530/sq mi)
- Time zone: UTC+2 (EET)
  - Summer (DST): UTC+3 (EEST)
- Postal code: 82652
- Area code: +380 3251
- Website: село Лавочне ^{(Ukrainian)}

Lavochne (Ukrainian: Лавочне; Polish: Ławoczne) is a village (selo) in the Stryi Raion, in the Lviv Oblast (province) of Western Ukraine (prior to 1959, it was situated in the Drohobych Oblast). It belongs to the Slavsko settlement hromada, one of the hromadas of Ukraine. The village has 1,198 inhabitants, and its local government was administered by the Lavochne Village Council until its dissolution in 2020.

== Geography ==
The village is located on the Lviv–Chop railway line. The Mukachevo–Svaliava–Lavochne railway line was constructed in 1881 and was modified in 1887 to form the Lviv–Stryi–Chop route. The Lavochne railway station building opened in 1886.
Lavochne is situated 146 kilometres (91 mi) from the regional center of Lviv, 41 kilometres (25 mi) from the city of Skole, and 10 kilometres (6.2 mi) from the rural settlement of Slavsko.

== History ==
The first written mention of the village refers to 1591, when it was a part of the Ruthenian voivodeship of the Rzeczpospolita. In the years 1772–1918, Lavochne was part of the Kingdom of Galicia and Lodomeria under Austrian rule. After the dissolution of Austria-Hungary, Lavochne became part of the Second Polish Republic, serving as the border railway station – first on the Polish–Czechoslovak border (until March 1939), and then on the Polish-Hungarian border. After the Invasion of Poland, Lavochne found itself in Soviet territory. From 1941 to 1944, Lavochne was part of Nazi Germany's District of Galicia. Lavochne was the last Ukrainian settlement liberated from Nazi occupation, on 8 October 1944. Since that time Lavochne is part of Ukraine (in Drohobych Oblast until 1959, since then in Lviv Oblast).
According to one telling, the village's name derives from wooden benches (Ukrainian: лавки, romanized: lavky) stacked in order to cross the river.

Until 18 July 2020, Lavochne belonged to the Skole Raion. That raion was abolished in July 2020 as part of an administrative reform in Ukraine, which reduced the number of raions of the Lviv Oblast to seven. The territory of the Skole Raion was merged into the Stryi Raion.

=== Lavochne in 1915 ===
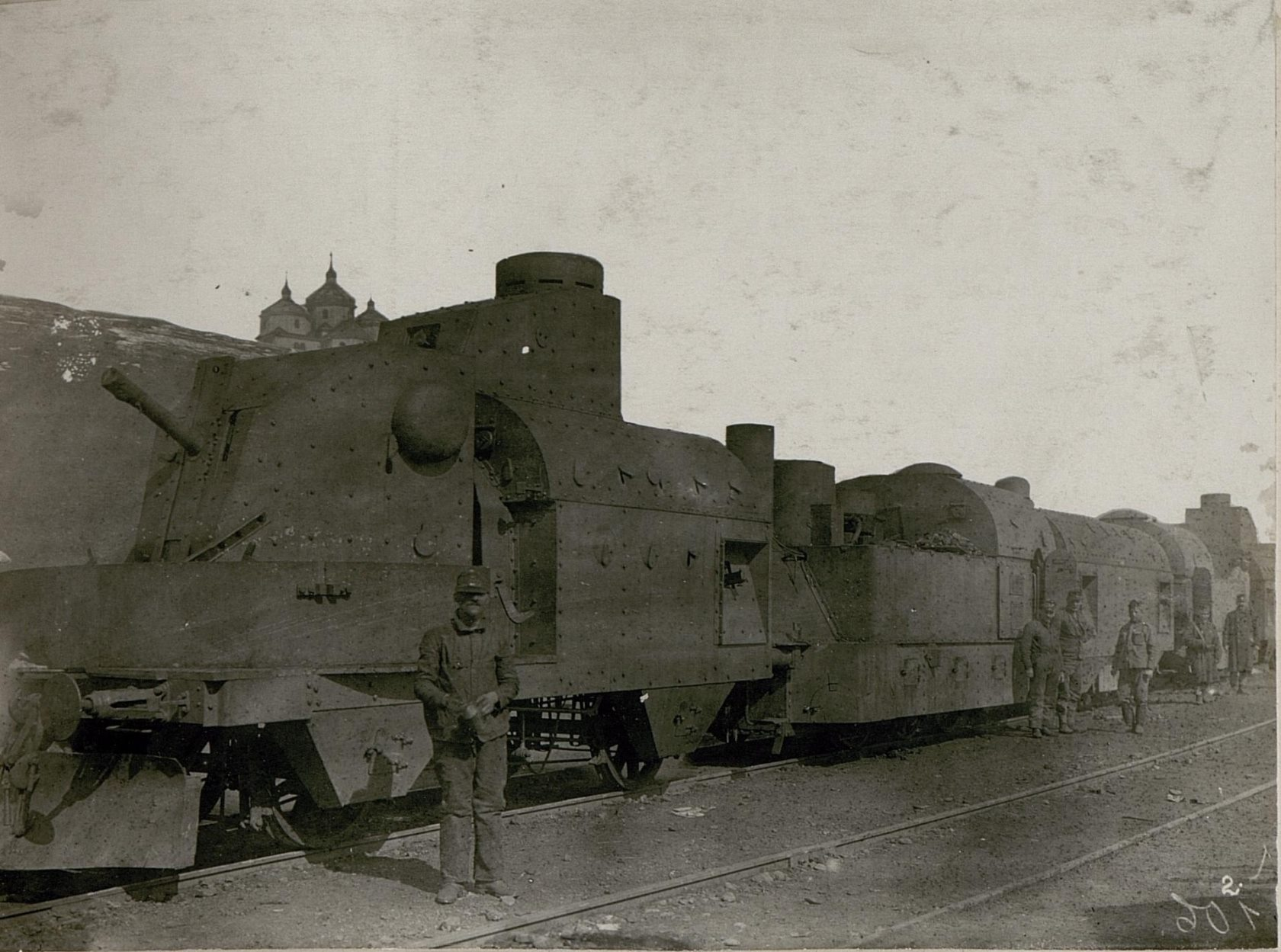

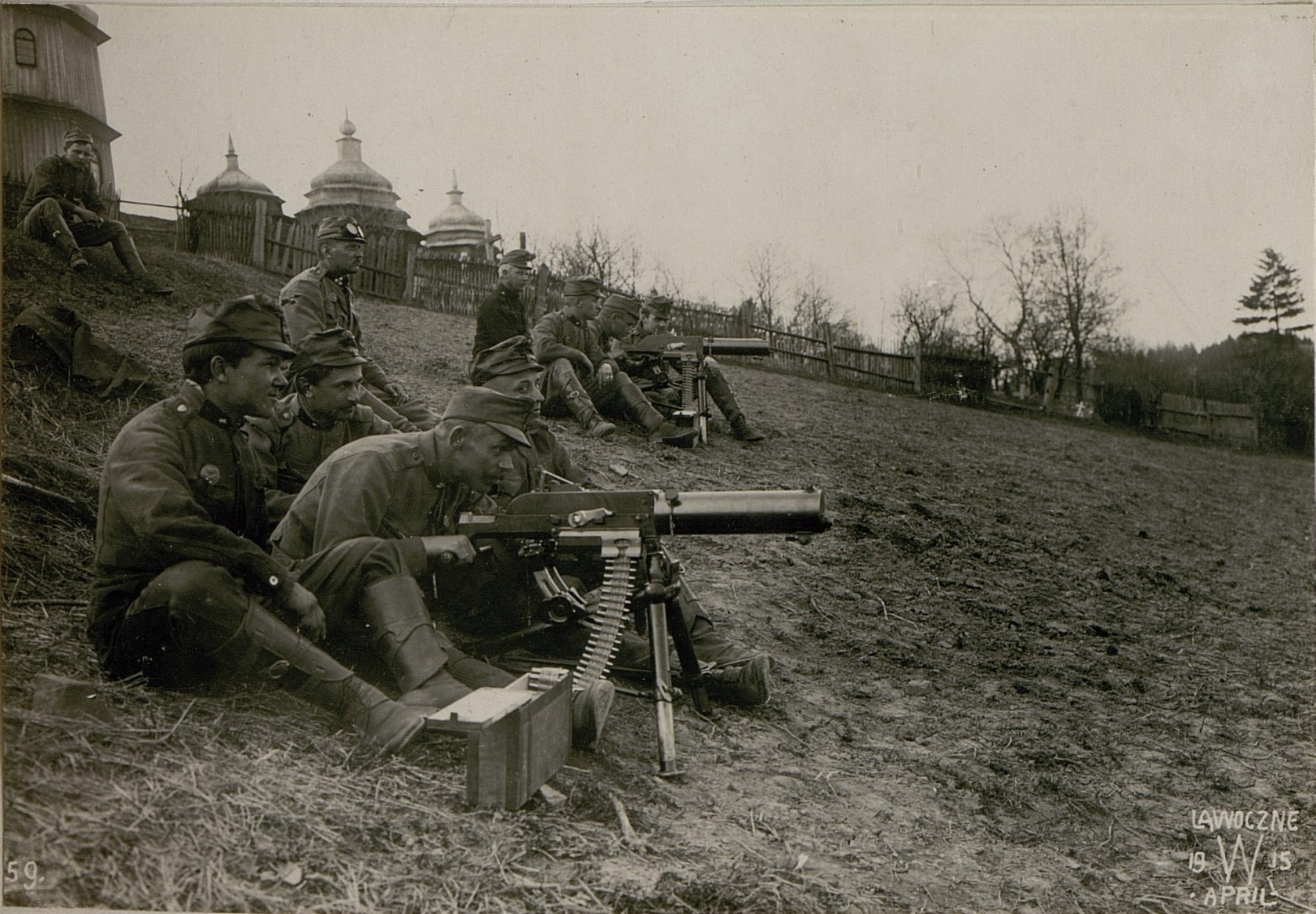

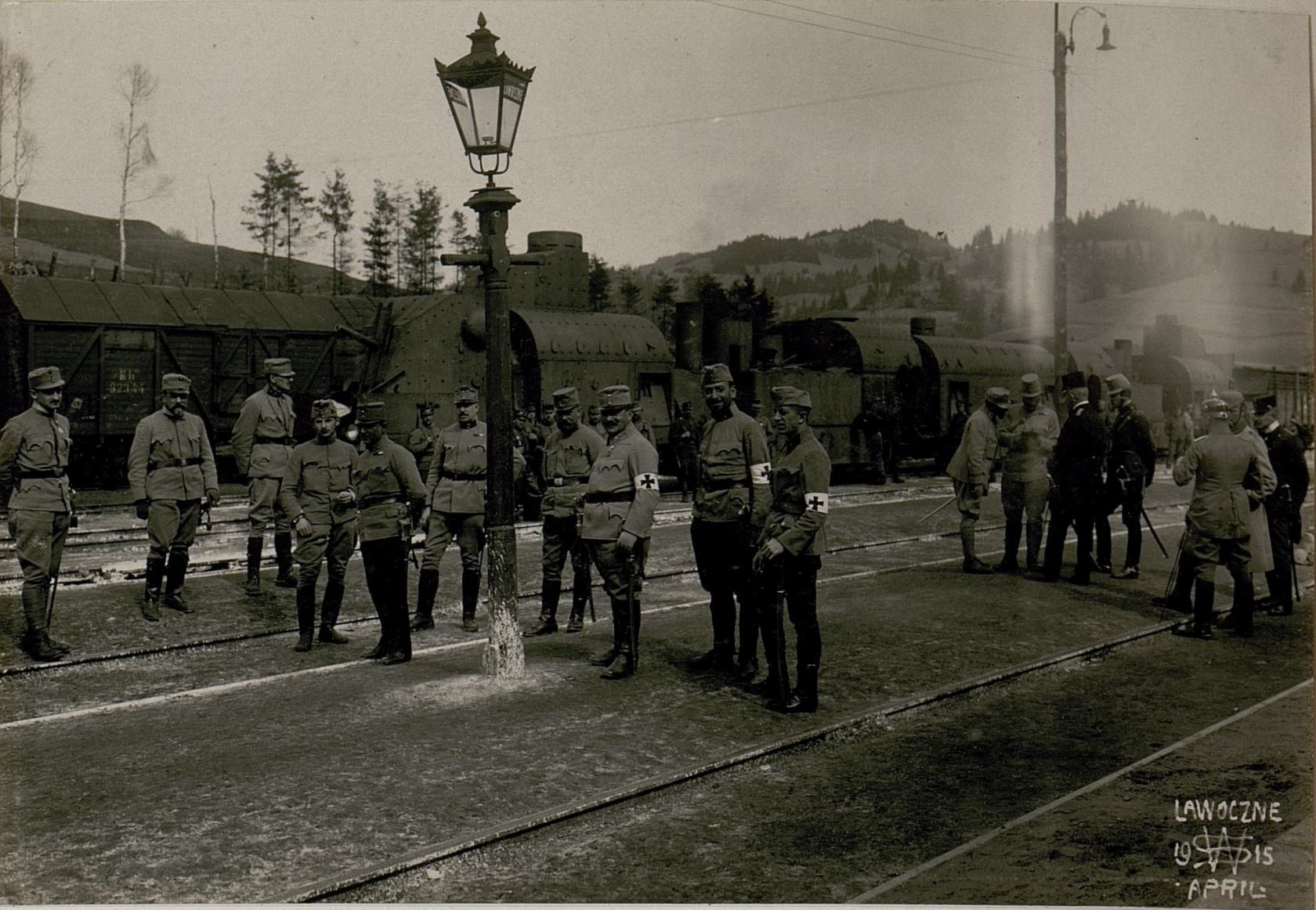

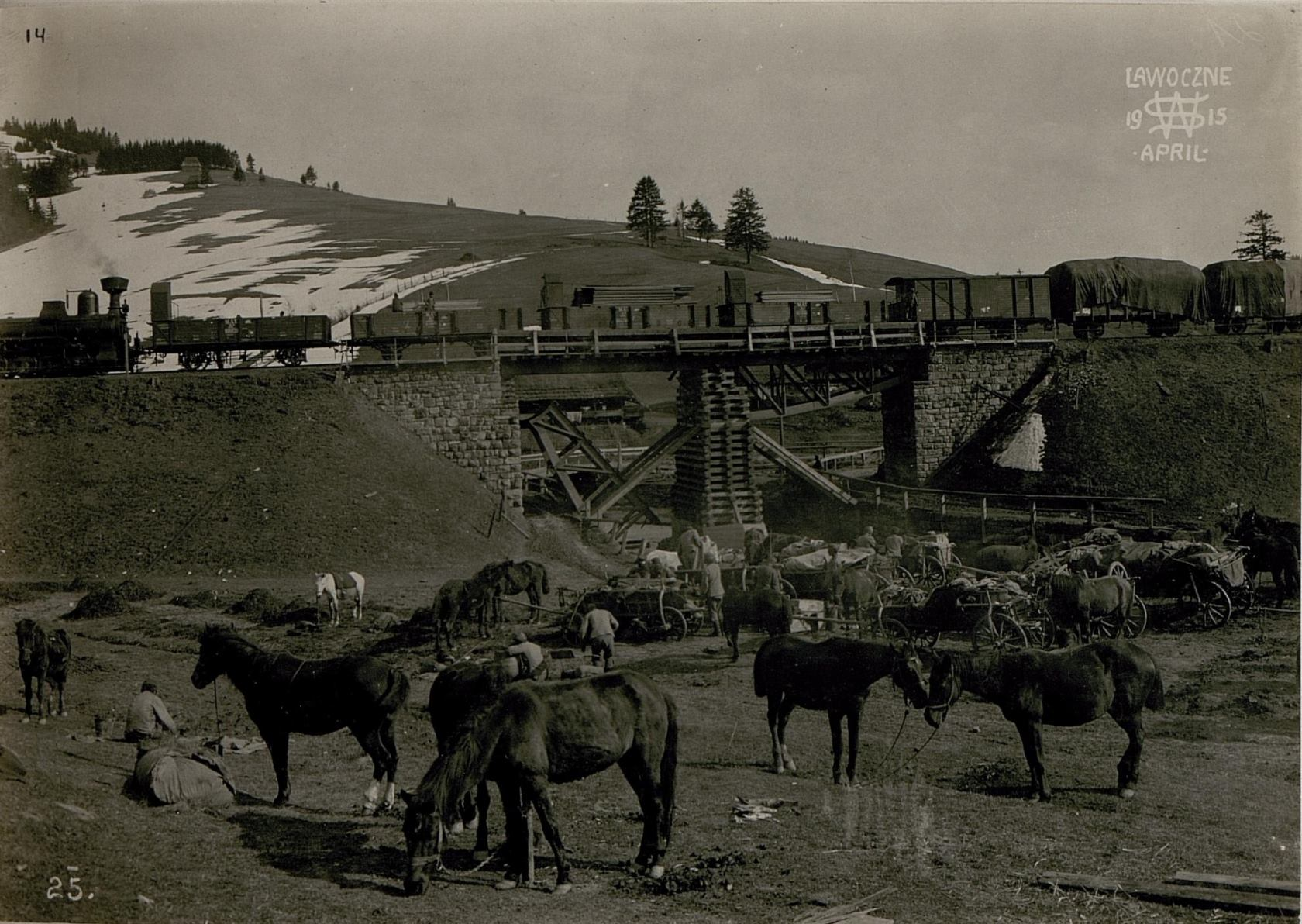

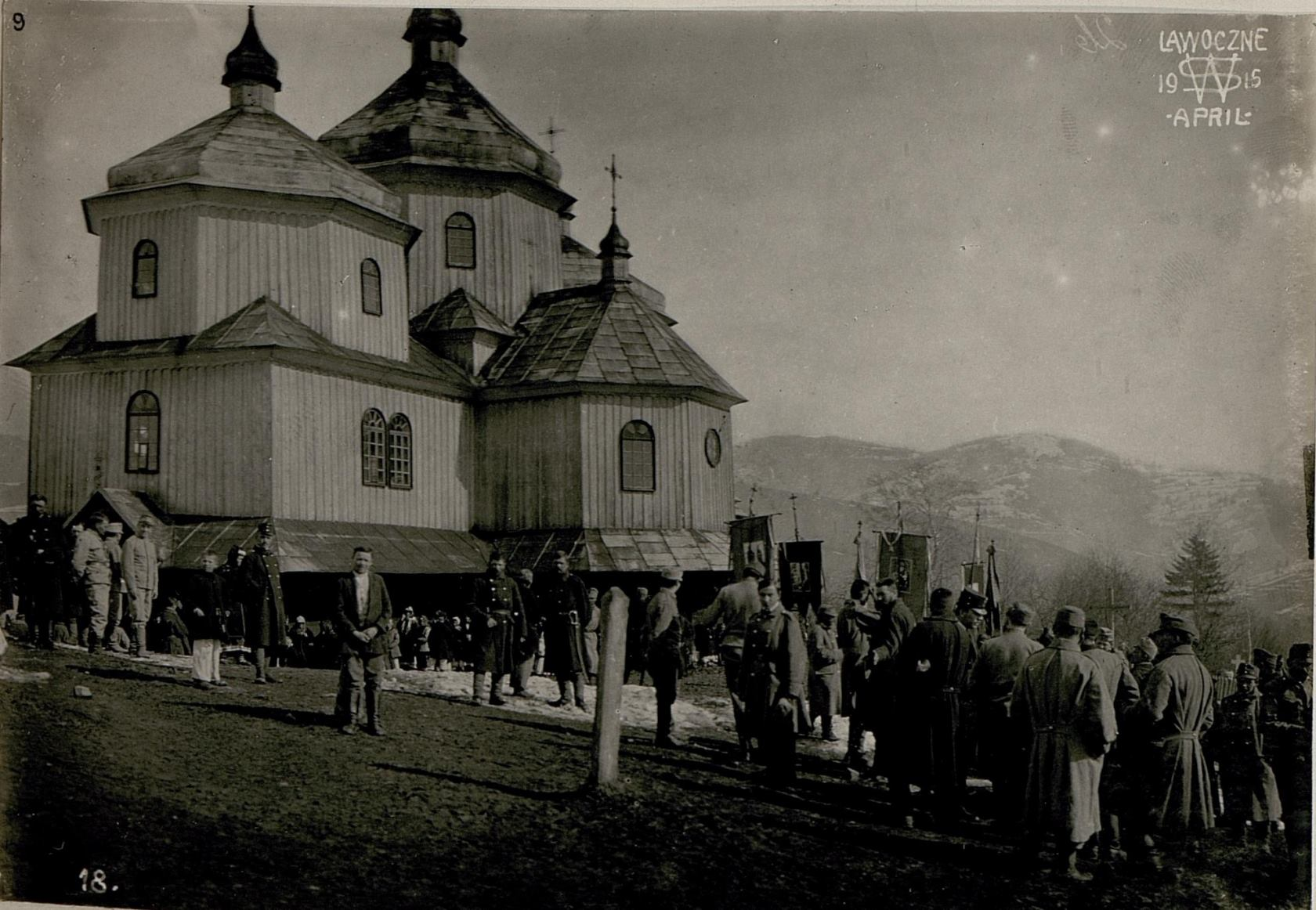

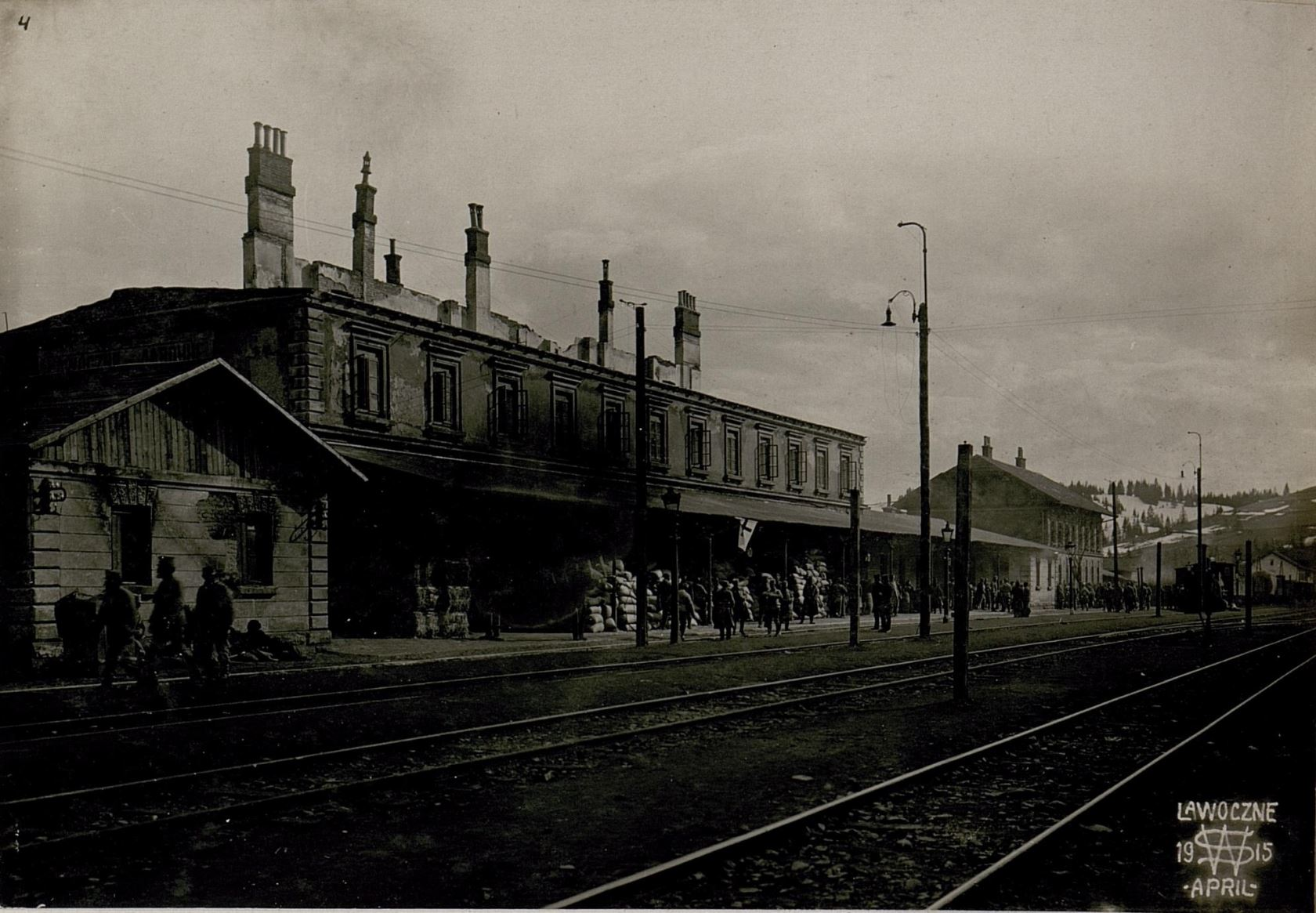

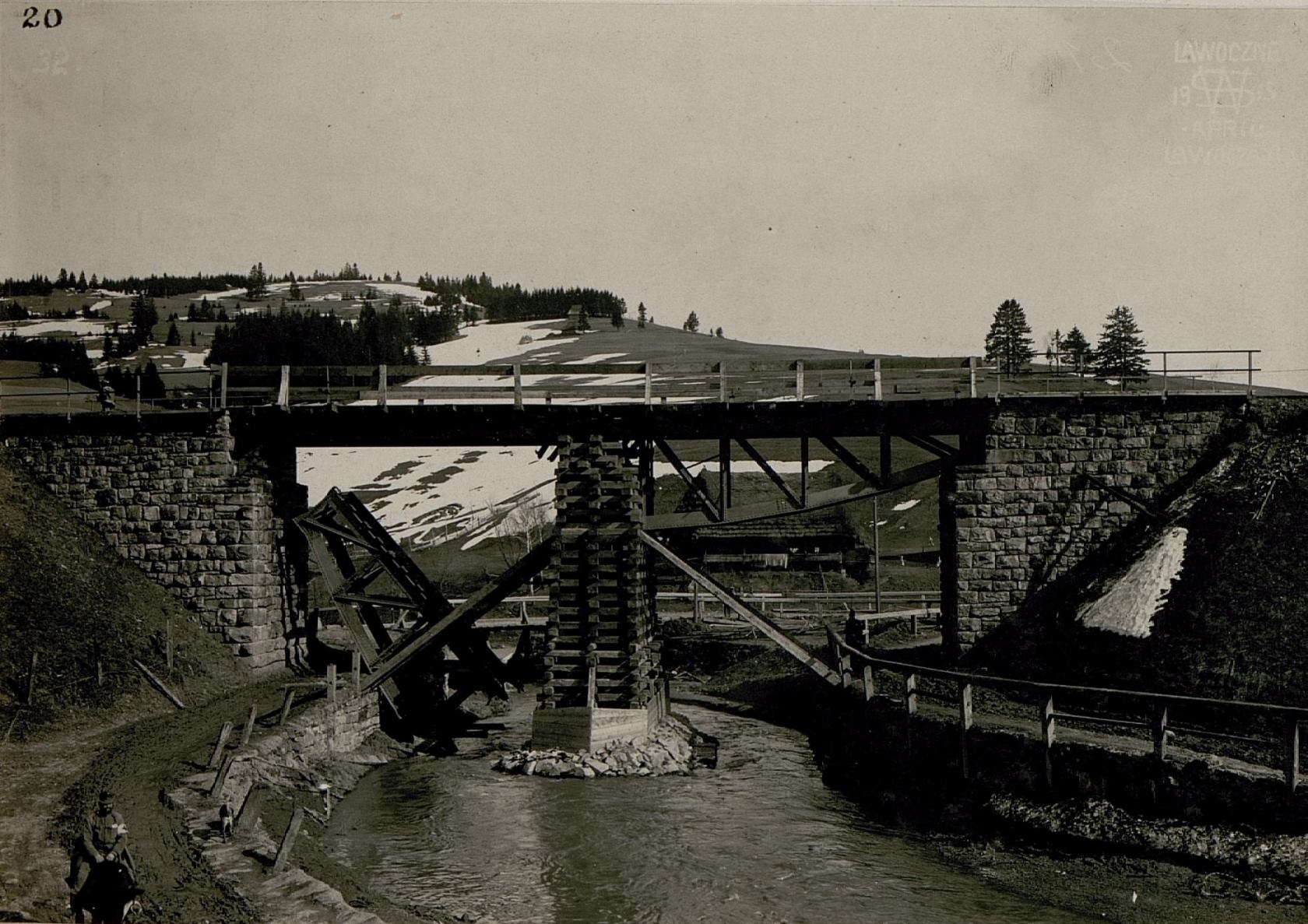

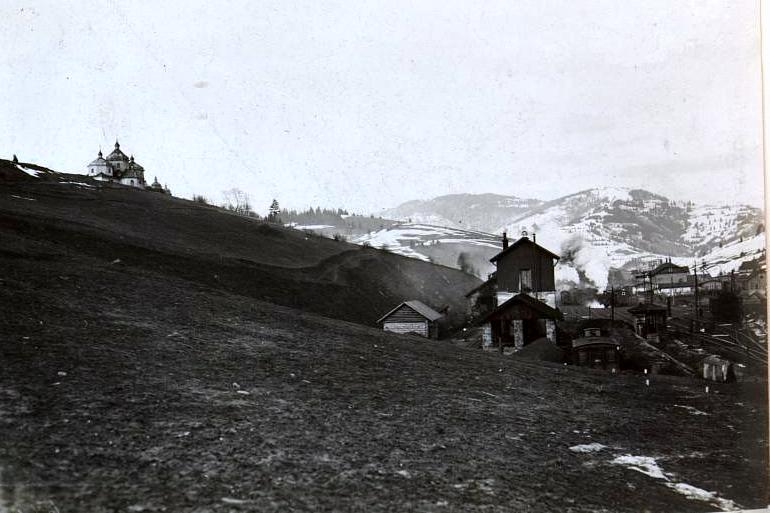

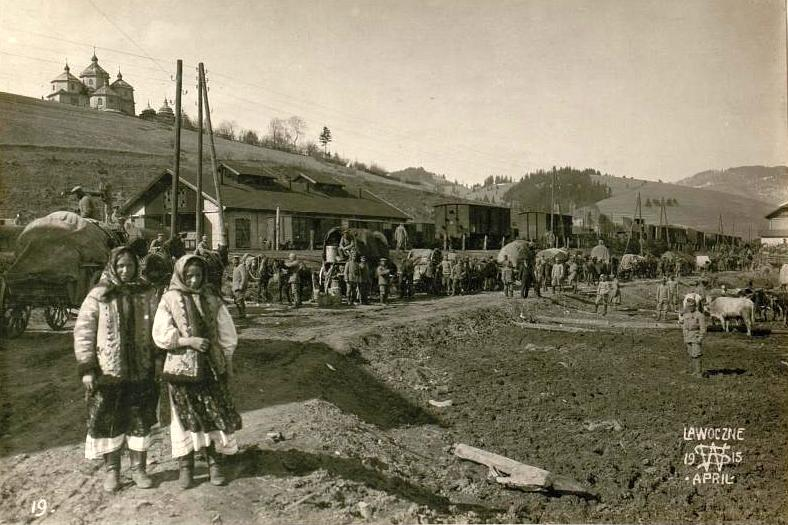

== Religious structures ==
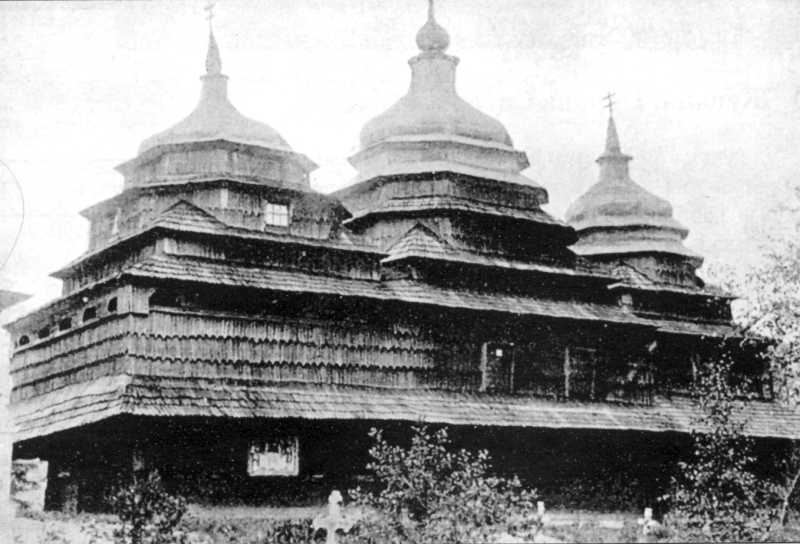
Saint Michael's Church (destroyed in a fire in 2012)

The village used to contain an architectural monument (1415/1), the wooden Church of St. Michael, dating to 1907. On July 10, 2012, the church was destroyed in a fire caused by a lightning strike. In its place, another church, also wooden, has been built.

== Mentions in literature ==
Lavochne is the hometown of the heroes of Mirjam Pressler's novel "Malka Mai".

== Literature ==
- Історія міст і сіл УРСР : Львівська область, Тершів. – К. : ГРУРЕ, 1968 р. Page 717 (in Ukrainian)
