= Church of the Assumption, Slavsko =

Church in Lviv Oblast, Ukraine

Church of the Assumption Церква Успіння Пресвятої Богородиці
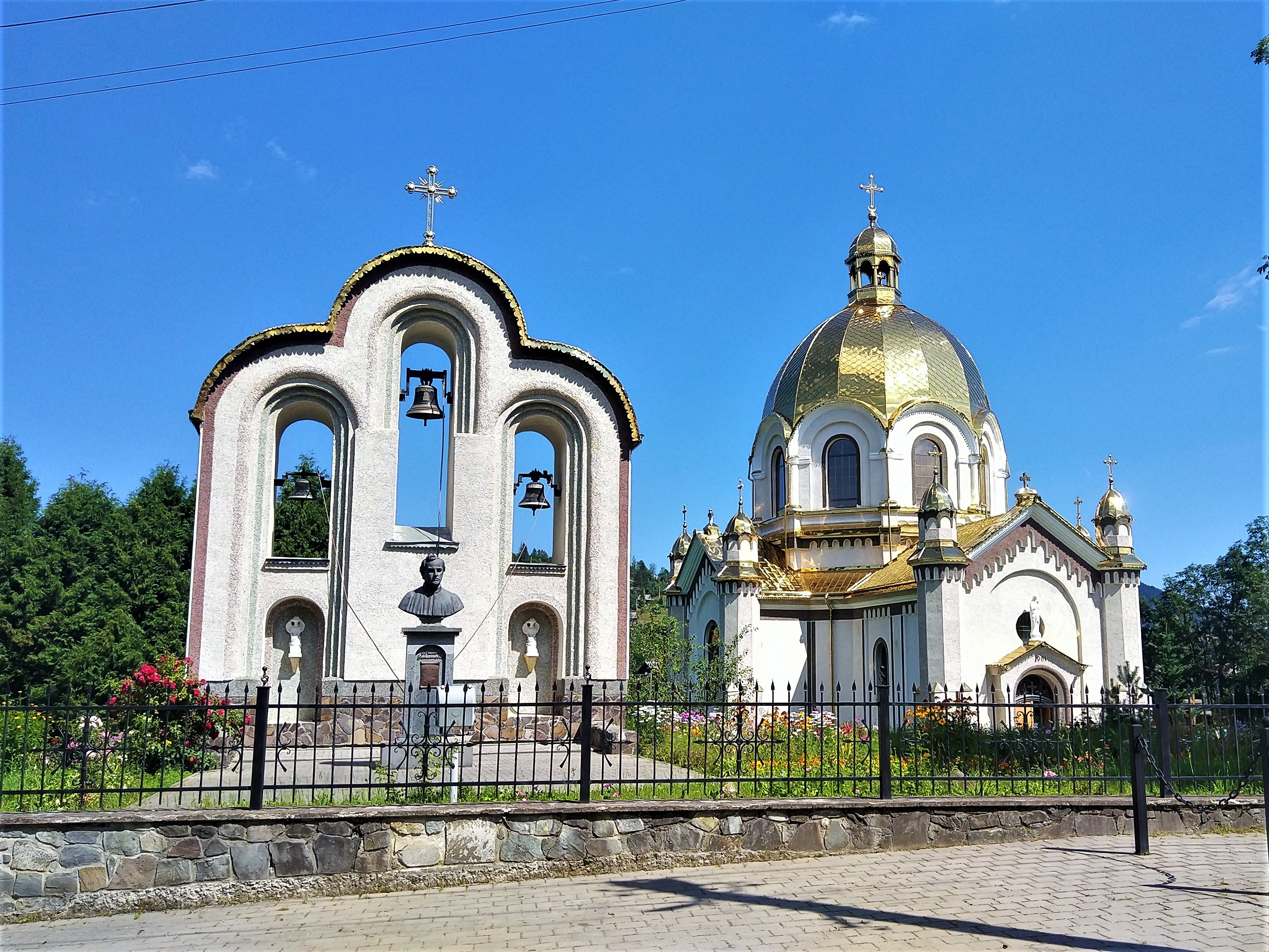

- Location within Lviv Oblast

Religion
- Affiliation: Ukrainian Greek Catholic Church

Location
- Location: Slavsko, Slavsko settlement hromada, Stryi Raion, Lviv Oblast, Ukraine
- Coordinates: 49°50′49″N 23°26′55″E

Architecture
- Completed: 1901

Church of the Assumption (Ukrainian: Церква Успіння Пресвятої Богородиці) is a Greek Catholic parish church (UGCC) in Slavsko of the Slavsko settlement hromada, Stryi Raion, Lviv Oblast, and an architectural monument of local importance.

== History ==
In 1900, the wooden church of St. Michael ([1832–1901]) was dismantled.

In 1901, the construction of the church under the title of the Assumption of the Blessed Virgin Mary was completed according to the project of architect Vasyl Nahirnyi. Metropolitan Andrey Sheptytsky supported the construction of the church.

In 1909, the church was painted by artists Modest Sosenko and Yulian Butsmaniuk. In 1944, the dome was damaged during the bombing of Slavsko by Soviet troops.

The church belonged to the deaneries of Skilsk ([1832-1906]) and Tukhlia ([1907-1944]). Number of parishioners: 1832 – 1.034, 1844 – 1.203, 1834 – 1.137, 1864 – 1.189, 1874 – 1.140, 1884 – 1.237, 1894 – 1.313, 1904 – 1.653, 1914 – 1.935, 1924 – 1.747, 1936 – 2.088.

Near the church there is a monument to the public figure, writer at. Mykola Ustianovych.

== Priests ==
- at. Mykola Hlodzinskyi ([1832]),
- at. Ivan Zarevych ([1836], administrator),
- at. Antin Skudlynskyi ([1838]),
- at. Mykhailo Medvetskyi (1838–1839, administrator),
- at. Anatazii Levytskyi (1839–1840),
- at. Ivan Rakovskyi (1840–1841),
- at. Mykola Ustianovych (1841–1842, administrator; 1842–1870),
- at. ? (1842–1868),
- at. Oleksandr Sabat (1868–1872, administrator),
- at. Stefan Mykhalevych (1872–1896),
- at. Petro Minko (1895–1896, employee; 1896–1897, administrator),
- at. Yevstakhii Kachmarskyi (1897–1932+),
- at. Yosyf Martynovych (1928–1929?, employee),
- at. Vasyl Eliasevskyi (1932–1933, administrator),
- at. Yosyf Lemischuk (1933–[1939]),
- at. Ivan Havryliuk (1938–1939, employee),
- at. Illia Yankovskyi (1930–1933, employee; 1941-[1944]),
- at. Andrii Petryshyn – presently.
