= Lybohora =

Lybohora (Ukrainian: Либохора) may refer to the following places in Lviv Oblast, Ukraine:

- Lybohora, Sambir Raion, village in Sambir Raion
- Lybohora, Stryi Raion, Lviv Oblast, village in Stryi Raion
