= Ternavka =

Ternavka may refer to the following places in Ukraine:

- Ternavka, Chernivtsi Oblast, village in Hertsa Raion, Chernivtsi Oblast
- Ternavka, Iziaslav Raion, village in Iziaslav Raion, Khmelnytskyi Oblast
- Ternavka, Kamianets-Podilskyi Raion, village in Kamianets-Podilskyi Raion, Khmelnytskyi Oblast
- Ternavka, Skole Raion, village in Skole Raion, Lviv Oblast
- Ternavka, Zhydachiv Raion, village in Zhydachiv Raion, Lviv Oblast
