= Lybohora, Stryi Raion, Lviv Oblast =

Village in Lviv Oblast, Ukraine

Lybohora Либохора Libochora
- Village
- Location within Lviv Oblast Location within Ukraine
- Coordinates: 48°53′46″N 23°30′46″E
- Country: Ukraine
- Oblast: Lviv
- Raion: Stryi Raion
- Established: 1300

Area
  - Total: 1.46 km^{2} (0.56 sq mi)
- Elevation /(average value of): 589 m (1,932 ft)

Population
  - Total: 918
  - Density: 629/km^{2} (1,630/sq mi)
- Time zone: UTC+2 (EET)
  - Summer (DST): UTC+3 (EEST)
- Postal code: 82632
- Area code: +380 3251
- Website: село Либохорa^{(Ukrainian)}

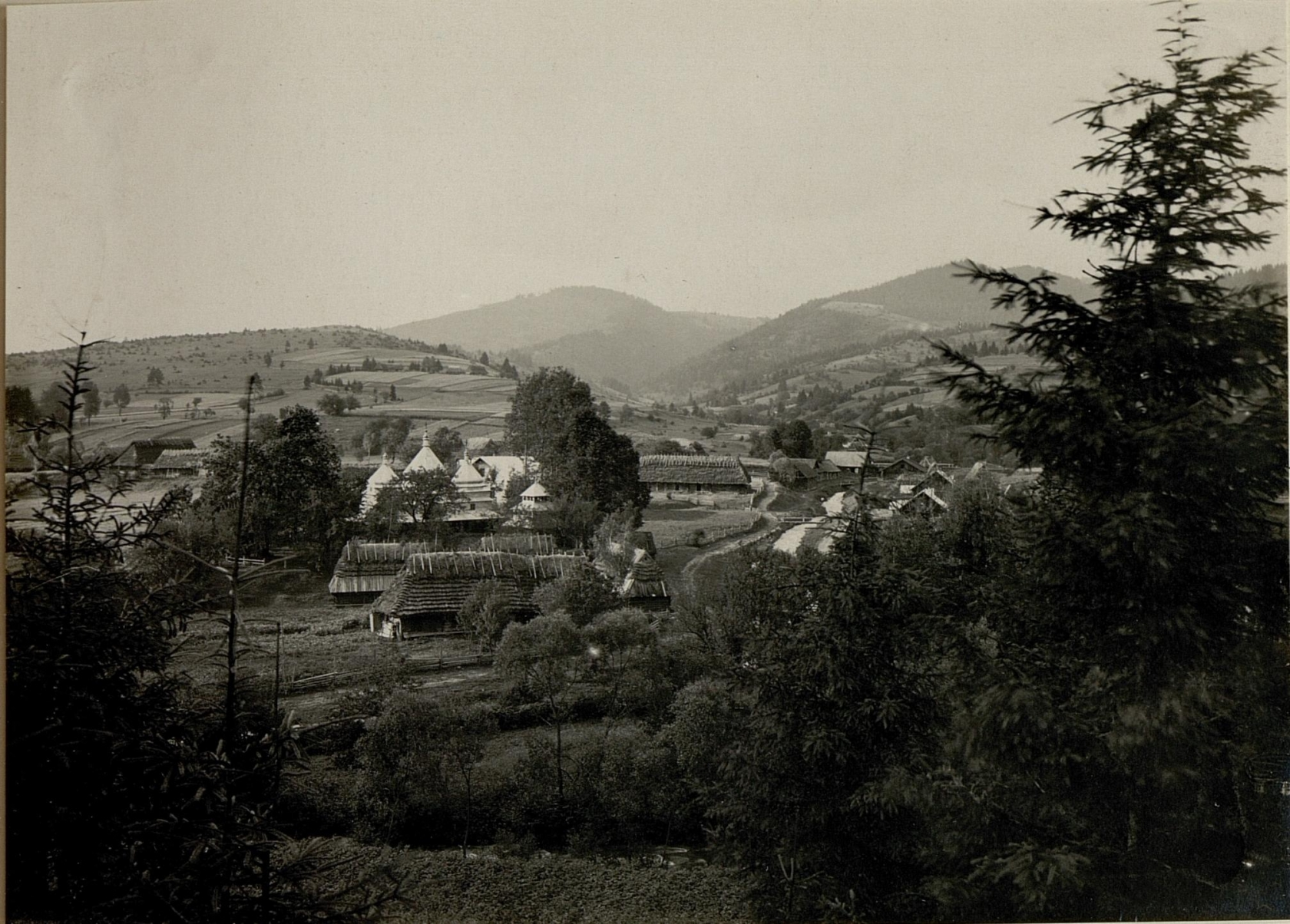
View of Lybohora in 1915

Lybohora (Ukrainian: Либохо́ра, Polish: Libochora) is a village (selo) in Stryi Raion, Lviv Oblast (province) of Western Ukraine. It belongs to the Slavske settlement hromada, one of the hromadas of Ukraine. The village has fewer than 1,000 inhabitants, and covers an area of 1,46 km^{2}.

The local government is administered by the Lybokhorivska village council.

== Geography ==
The village is located between high mountains. The second-highest peak of Lviv region - Mount Magura (1,362.7 metres (4,471 ft)) towers over the village.

Lybohora is located 129 kilometres (80 mi) from the regional center, Lviv; 14 kilometres (8.7 mi) from the district center, Skole; and 12 kilometres (7.5 mi) from the urban village, Slavske.

== History and attractions ==
The village was probably founded around 1300, but first appeared in written sources in the 14th and 15th centuries.

Until 18 July 2020, Lybohora belonged to Skole Raion. The raion was abolished in July 2020 during Ukraine’s administrative reform, which reduced the number of raions in Lviv Oblast to seven. The area of Skole Raion was merged into Stryi Raion.

The village has an architectural monument of local importance in Stryi Raion: the wooden Christmas Church, built in 1790 (1496-M).
