= Khashchovania =

Village in Lviv Oblast, Ukraine

- Village
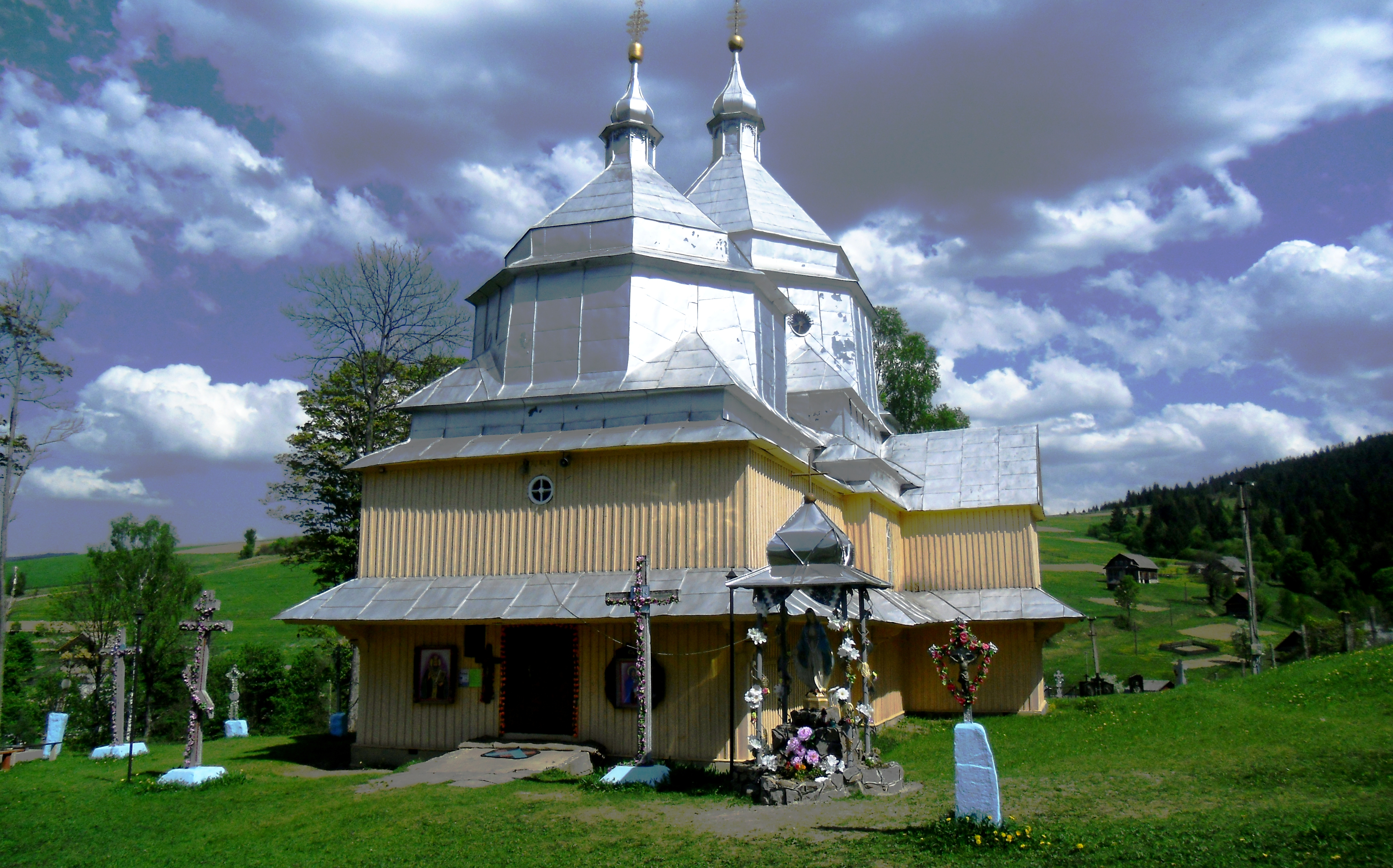

- Location within Lviv Oblast
- Coordinates: 48°45′28″N 23°23′54″E
- Country: Ukraine
- Oblast: Lviv Oblast
- Raion: Stryi Raion
- Area: 13 km^{2} (5.0 sq mi)
- Elevation: 728 m (2,388 ft)
- Population: 383
  - Density: 29,462/km^{2} (76,310/sq mi)
- Website: село Хащованя ^{(Ukrainian)}

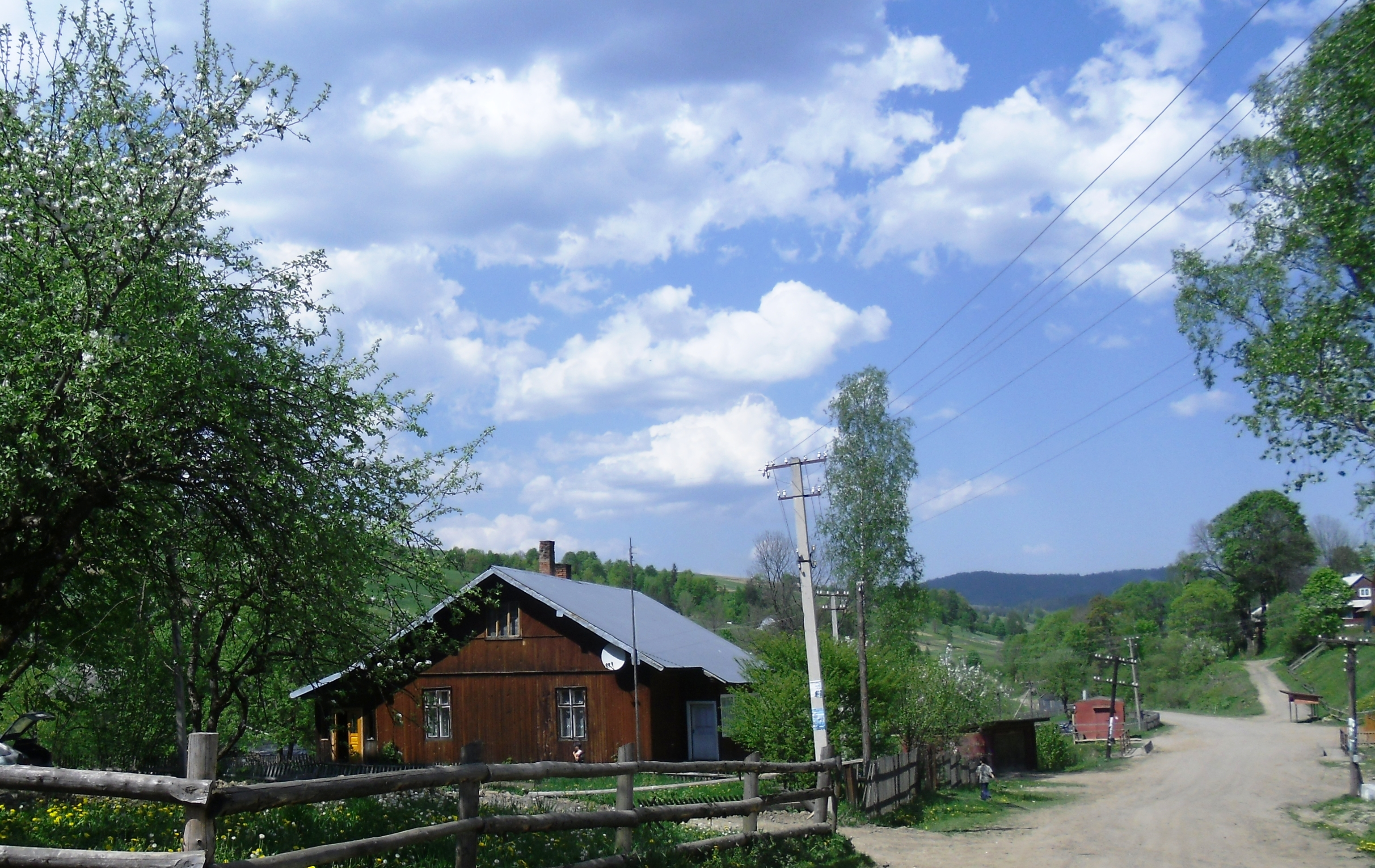
Khashchovania, countryside landscape.

Khashchovania (Ukrainian: Хащова́ня, Polish: Chaszczowanie) is a village (selo) in Stryi Raion, Lviv Oblast, of western Ukraine. More specifically, it is located in the Ukrainian Carpathians within the limits of the Eastern Beskids (Skole Beskids) in southwestern part of the oblast. It is 153 kilometres (95 mi) from the city of Lviv, 41 kilometres (25 mi) from Skole, and 13 kilometres (8.1 mi) from Slavske. Khashchovania belongs to Slavske settlement hromada, one of the hromadas of Ukraine. Local government is administered by the Volosiankivska village council.

== History ==
The village was founded in 1580. It is one of the settlements in Stryi Raion where traditional Boyko architecture wooden churches of the 19th century are well-preserved, including the St. John the Baptist Church built in 1846.

Before the Second World War the promoters of churches in Volosyanka and Khashchovania were the barons of Gredli. They also controlled local industry.

Until 18 July 2020, Khashchovania belonged to Skole Raion. The raion was abolished in July 2020 as part of the administrative reform of Ukraine, which reduced the number of raions of Lviv Oblast to seven. The area of Skole Raion was merged into Stryi Raion.

== Culture ==
Since the time of the early Old Rus tribes, people of the Carpathian mountain region have created unique embroidery, with local variances. The craft has survived and is an important aspect of the area's folk culture. Embroidered works are popular in Ukraine and abroad.
