= Khitar =

Village in Lviv Oblast, Ukraine

Khitar (Ukrainian: Хі́тар, Polish: Hutar) is a village (selo) in Stryi Raion, Lviv Oblast, in western Ukraine. Khitar is located in the Ukrainian Carpathians within the limits of the Eastern Beskids (Skole Beskids) in southern Lviv Oblast in Skole Raion. It belongs to Slavske settlement hromada, one of the hromadas of Ukraine. Local government — Khitarska village council.
The village is situated along the river Vandrivka (Khitarka).
It is located 142 kilometres (88 mi) from the city of Lviv, 33 kilometres (21 mi) from Skole, and 134 kilometres (83 mi) from Uzhhorod.

== History ==
The first written mention of the settlement dates back to 1572.

The name of the village Khitar comes from the Romanian word “hotar”, or possibly from the Hungarian word “hatar” which means “boundary”. Most probably from a boundary between feudal lands.
Metropolitan Andrey Sheptytsky visited the village in 1928. Andrey Sheptytsky served Divine Liturgy, and 28 of priests sang in the choir.

Until 18 July 2020, Khitar belonged to Skole Raion. The raion was abolished in July 2020 as part of the administrative reform of Ukraine, which reduced the number of raions of Lviv Oblast to seven. The area of Skole Raion was merged into Stryi Raion.

== Culture ==
The village has two monuments of Cultural Heritage in Ukraine;

- Church of St. Michael (wooden), 1860 Village Hitar;
- The bell tower of the church of St. Michael (wooden), 1860 Village Hitar.
