= Verkhnia Rozhanka =

Village in Lviv Oblast, Ukraine

Verkhnia Rozhanka Верхня Рожанка
- Village
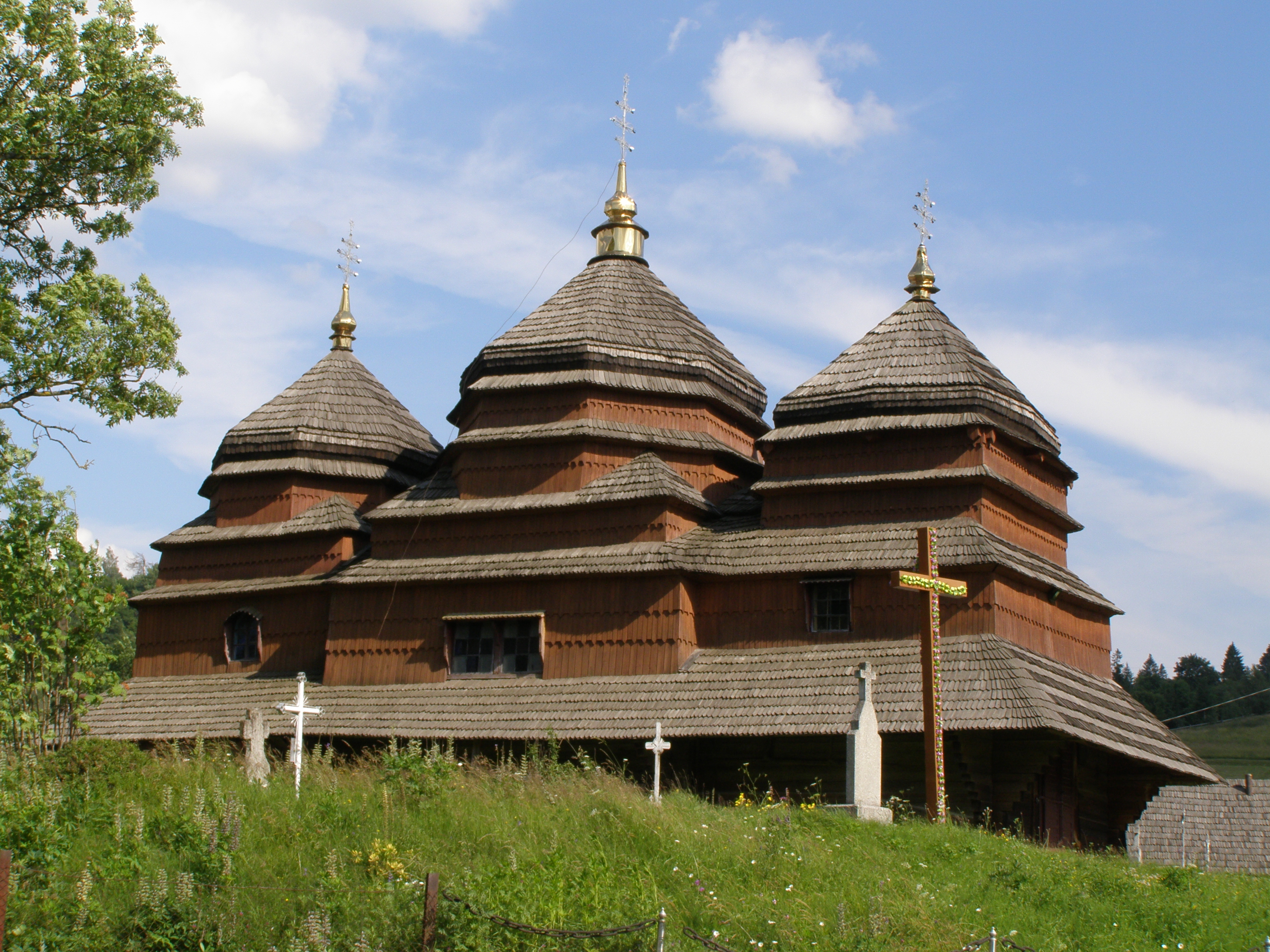
- Church of the Pentecost

- Location within Lviv Oblast
- Coordinates: 48°46′50″N 23°30′56″E
- Country: Ukraine
- Oblast: Lviv Oblast
- District: Stryi Raion
- Established: 1675

Area
  - Total: 2,775 km^{2} (1,071 sq mi)
- Elevation /(average value of): 707 m (2,320 ft)

Population
  - Total: 1,134
  - Density: 4,086/km^{2} (10,580/sq mi)
- Time zone: UTC+2 (EET)
  - Summer (DST): UTC+3 (EEST)
- Postal code: 82662
- Area code: +380 3251
- Website: село Верхня Рожанка^{(Ukrainian)}

Verkhnia Rozhanka (Ukrainian: Ве́рхня Рожа́нка, Polish: Rożanka Wyżna) is a village in Stryi Raion, Lviv Oblast in western Ukraine. It belongs to the Slavske settlement hromada, one of the hromadas of Ukraine. The local government is the Nyzhnorozhanska village council.

== Geography ==
The village is located between the highest of picturesque mountains. To the west of the village are the vertices Vysokyy Verh (1,242 metres (4,070 ft)), Mount Yarochysche (987 metres (3,240 ft)), and Mount Yalyna (1,164.5 metres (3,821 ft)).

The village is located 145 kilometres (90 mi) from the regional center of Lviv, 36 kilometres (22 mi) from the city of Skole, and 16 kilometres (9.9 mi) from the urban-type settlement of Slavske.

== History ==
The first record of the village dates back to the year 1675.

Until 18 July 2020, Verkhnia Rozhanka belonged to Skole Raion. The raion was abolished in July 2020 as part of the administrative reform of Ukraine, which reduced the number of raions of Lviv Oblast to seven. The area of Skole Raion was merged into Stryi Raion.

== Attractions ==
The village has two sights of architecture of Stryi Raion.

- Church of the Holy Spirit (wood, 1804) (513 / 1)
- The bell tower of the Holy Spirit Church (wood, 1877) (513 / 2)
