= Holovetsko, Stryi Raion =

Village in Lviv Oblast, Ukraine

Holovetsko Головецько
- Village
- Location within Ukraine Location within Lviv Oblast
- Coordinates: 48°54′42″N 23°23′49″E
- Country: Ukraine
- Oblast: Lviv Oblast
- Raion: Stryi Raion
- Hromada: Slavske settlement hromada
- Established: 1574

Area
  - Total: 173 km^{2} (67 sq mi)
- Elevation /(average value of): 634 m (2,080 ft)

Population
  - Total: 524
  - Density: 30,289/km^{2} (78,450/sq mi)
- Time zone: UTC+2 (EET)
  - Summer (DST): UTC+3 (EEST)
- Postal code: 82641
- Area code: +380 3251
- Website: село Головецько^{(Ukrainian)}

Holovetsko (Ukrainian: Головецько, Polish: Hołowiecko) is a village (selo) in Stryi Raion, Lviv Oblast, of Western Ukraine. It belongs to Slavske settlement hromada, one of the hromadas of Ukraine. Local government is administered by the Holovetska village council.

== Geography ==
The village is situated in the Ukrainian Carpathians along the river Holovchanka (Khitarka, Vandrivka). The village is located at the foot of the legendary Makivka mountain.
It is at a distance of 134 kilometres (83 mi) from the regional center of Lviv, 26 kilometres (16 mi) from the district center Skole, and 15 kilometres (9.3 mi) from the rural settlement Slavske.

== History and Attractions ==
The first record of the village dates back to 1574.

Until 18 July 2020, Holovetsko belonged to Skole Raion. The raion was abolished in July 2020 as part of the administrative reform of Ukraine, which reduced the number of raions of Lviv Oblast to seven. The area of Skole Raion was merged into Stryi Raion.

In the village was an architectural monument of local importance to Stryi Raion — Church of the Epiphany (wooden) 1873, (1494-М). The church burned down on January 28, 2007.
