= Kalne, Lviv Oblast =

Village in Lviv Oblast, Ukraine

Kalne Кальне
- Village
- Location within Lviv Oblast
- Coordinates: 48°51′03″N 23°19′38″E
- Country: Ukraine
- Oblast: Lviv Oblast
- District: Stryi Raion
- Established: 1608

Area
  - Total: 1,201 km^{2} (464 sq mi)
- Elevation /(average value of): 711 m (2,333 ft)

Population
  - Total: 243
  - Density: 20,233/km^{2} (52,400/sq mi)
- Time zone: UTC+2 (EET)
  - Summer (DST): UTC+3 (EEST)
- Postal code: 82644
- Area code: +380 3251
- Website: село Кальне ^{(Ukrainian)}

Kalne (Ukrainian: Ка́льне) is a village (selo) in Stryi Raion, Lviv Oblast, of Western Ukraine. The village of Kalne is located in the Ukrainian Carpathians, within the Eastern Beskids (Skole Beskids), in southern Lviv Oblast. It is located 150 kilometres (93 mi) from the city of Lviv, 80 kilometres (50 mi) from Stryi, and 40 kilometres (25 mi) from Skole. Kalne belongs to the Slavske settlement hromada, one of the hromadas of Ukraine. Local government is the Khitarska village council.

The first written record indicates that the village was founded in 1608.

Until 18 July 2020, Kalne belonged to Skole Raion. The raion was abolished in July 2020 as part of Ukraine's administrative reform, which reduced the number of raions in Lviv Oblast to seven. The area of Skole Raion was merged into Stryi Raion.

The church of St. Arch. Michael (1820) and a wooden Bell Tower built in 1837, are located in the village.
