= Trostian =

- Тростян
- Location within Ukraine

Highest point
- Elevation: 1,232 m (4,042 ft)
- Listing: Country high point
- Coordinates: 48°51′24″N 23°23′31″E

Geography
- Location: Lviv Oblast, Ukraine
- Parent range: Skole Beskids

Trostian (Ukrainian: Тростян) is a mountain peak in the range of the Skole Beskids (Eastern Beskids), peak spine Stryi-San Highland and limited by valleys Opir River and Holovchanka River. Mountain Trostian has a height of 1,232 metres (4,042 ft) and the steep (30-40 °) slopes at north-eastern. The top is flat.

Trostian Mountain is located at a distance 2 kilometres (1.2 mi) from the rural settlement of Slavsko, 132 kilometres (82 mi) from the regional center of Lviv and 29 kilometres (18 mi) from the city of Skole. The mountain has slopes for skiing in the east, north and west.

== Gallery ==
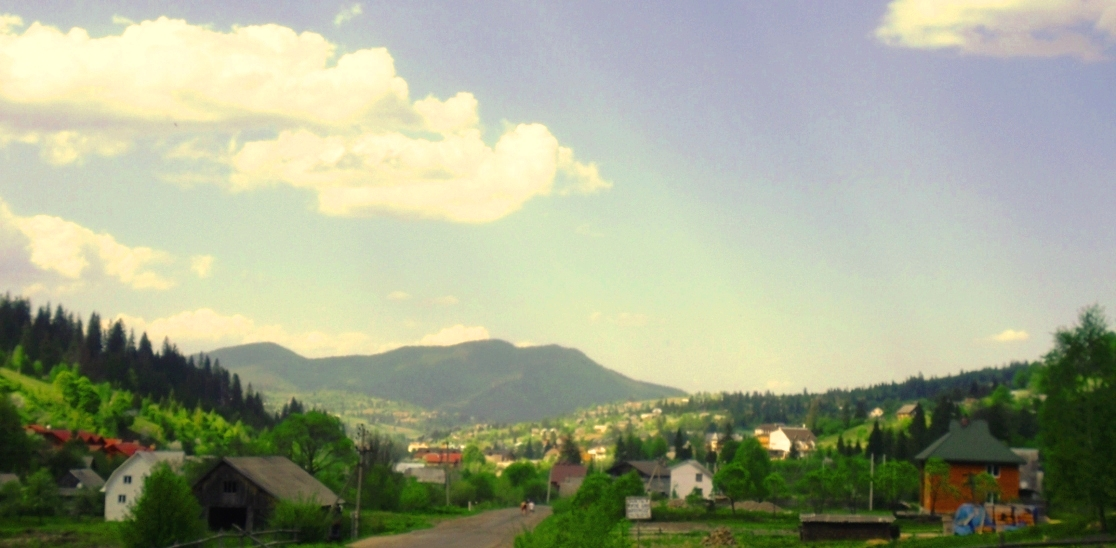
Southern slope of the Trostian Mountain.

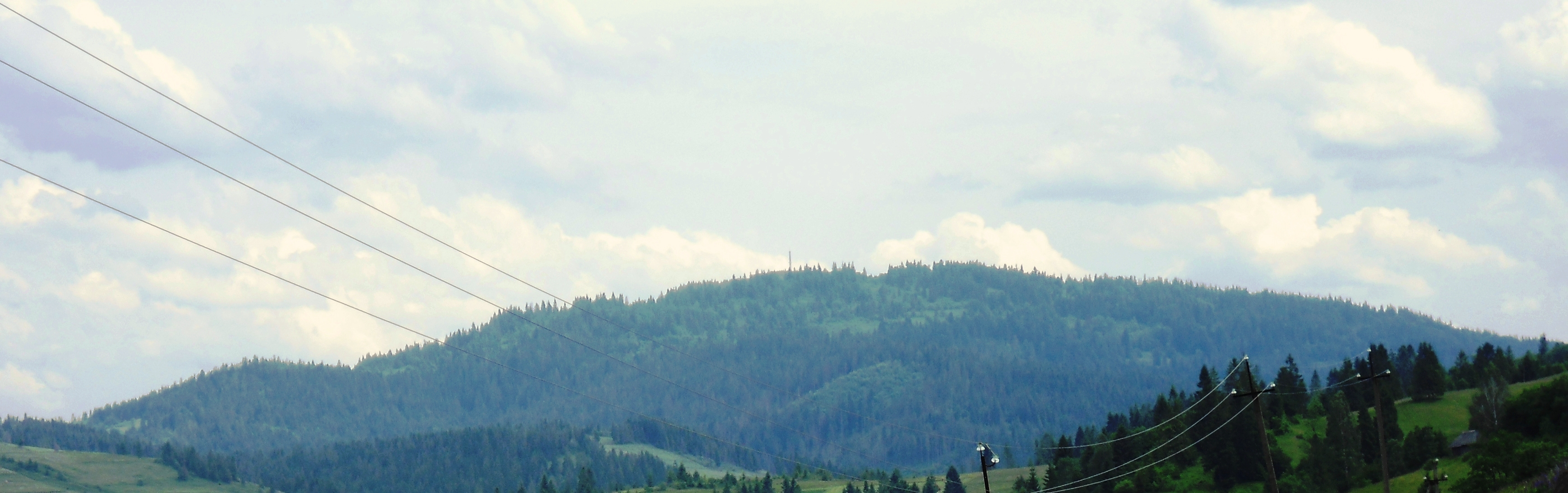
View of Mount Trostian (1235 m)
