= Ternavka, Slavske settlement hromada, Stryi Raion, Lviv Oblast =

Village in Lviv Oblast, Ukraine

Ternavka Терна́вка
- Village
- Location within Lviv Oblast
- Coordinates: 48°49′01″N 23°23′32″E
- Country: Ukraine
- Oblast: Lviv Oblast
- District: Stryi Raion
- Established: 1597

Area
  - Total: 173 km^{2} (67 sq mi)
- Elevation /(average value of): 693 m (2,274 ft)

Population
  - Total: 766
  - Density: 44,277/km^{2} (114,680/sq mi)
- Time zone: UTC+2 (EET)
  - Summer (DST): UTC+3 (EEST)
- Postal code: 82652
- Area code: +380 3251
- Website: село Тернавка ^{(Ukrainian)}

Ternavka (Ukrainian: Терна́вка, Polish: Tarnawka) is a village in Stryi Raion, Lviv Oblast in western Ukraine. It is located in the Ukrainian Carpathians, within the Eastern Beskids on the border of Zakarpattia Oblast. Ternavka belongs to Slavske settlement hromada, one of the hromadas of Ukraine.

== History ==
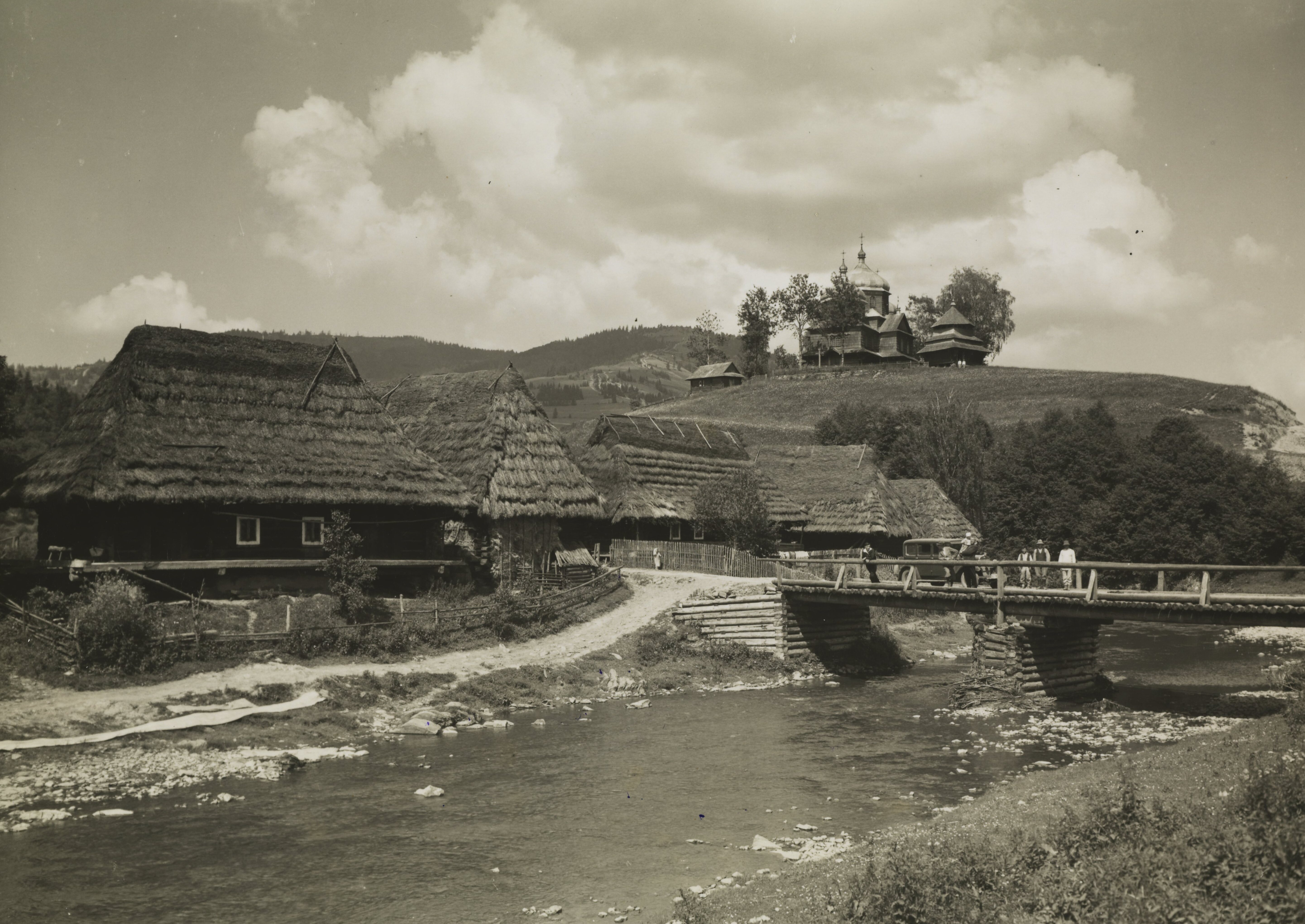
Orthodox church and Boyko cottages, before 1932

The first written mention of Ternavka dates from 1597. During World War I, the town's church was damaged as a result of fighting. It was restored in 1921.

Until 18 July 2020, Ternavka belonged to Skole Raion. The raion was abolished in July 2020 as part of the administrative reform of Ukraine, which reduced the number of raions of Lviv Oblast to seven. The area of Skole Raion was merged into Stryi Raion.
