= Slavsko settlement hromada =

Hromada in Lviv Oblast, Ukraine

Slavsko settlement hromada Славська селищна громада
- Hromada
- Seal
- Interactive map of Slavsko settlement hromada
- Country: Ukraine
- Oblast: Lviv Oblast
- Raion: Stryi Raion
- Admin. center: Slavsko

Area
  - Total: 4,299 km^{2} (1,660 sq mi)

Population (2021)
  - Total: 14,217
  - Density: 3.307/km^{2} (8.565/sq mi)
- CATOTTG code: UA46100210000027970
- Settlements: 16
- Rural settlements: 1
- Villages: 15
- Website: slavska-gromada.gov.ua

Slavsko settlement hromada (Ukrainian: Славська селищна громада) is a hromada in Ukraine, in Stryi Raion of Lviv Oblast. The administrative center is the rural settlement of Slavsko.

== Settlements ==
The hromada consists of 1 rural settlement (Slavske) and 15 villages:

- Verkhnia Rozhanka
- Volosianka
- Holovetsko
- Hrabovets
- Kalne
- Lavochne
- Lybokhora
- Nyzhnia Rozhanka
- Oporets
- Pshonets
- Ternavka
- Tukhlia
- Khashchovania
- Khitar
- Yalynkuvate
