= Slavsko =

Rural locality in Lviv Oblast, Ukraine

Slavsko Славсько
- Rural settlement
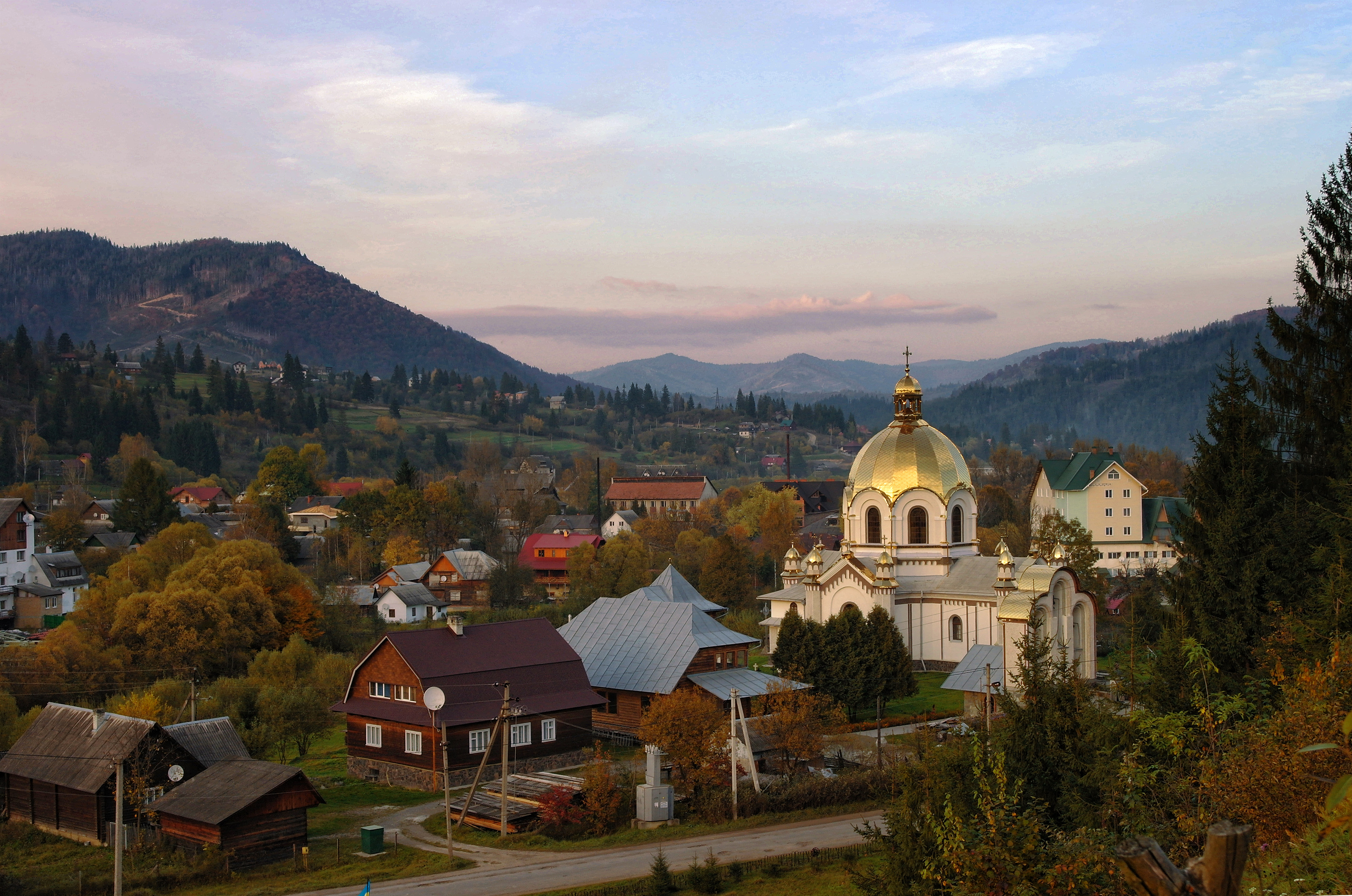

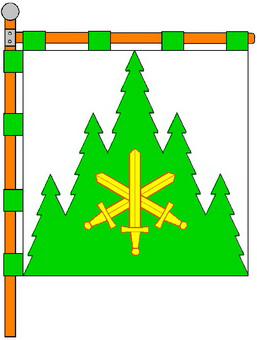
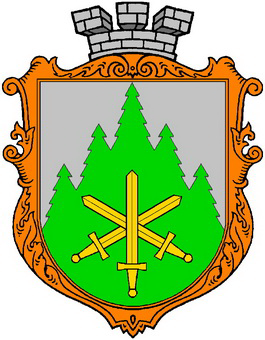
- Flag Coat of arms

- Location within Lviv Oblast Location within Ukraine
- Coordinates: 48°52′55″N 23°30′50″E
- Country: Ukraine
- Oblast: Lviv Oblast
- Raion: Stryi Raion
- Hromada: Slavsko settlement hromada

Area
  - Total: 4.08 km^{2} (1.58 sq mi)
- Elevation: 600 m (2,000 ft)

Population (2022)
  - Total: 3,537
  - Density: 867/km^{2} (2,250/sq mi)
- Time zone: UTC+2 (EET)
  - Summer (DST): UTC+3 (EEST)
- Postal code: 82660
- Area code: +380-3251

Slavsko (Ukrainian: Славсько; Polish: Sławsko) is a rural settlement in Stryi Raion, Lviv Oblast, Ukraine. It is located 600 metres (2,000 ft) above sea level close to the city of Skole, 130 kilometres (81 mi) southwest of Lviv. Slavsko is a rural settlement and a popular ski resort in the Skole Beskids range of the Carpathian Mountains in western Ukraine. It is one of the biggest Ukrainian winter sports centers. It hosts the administration of Slavsko settlement hromada, one of the hromadas of Ukraine. Population: 3,537 (2022 estimate).

== Location ==
Slavsko is situated in the valley of the Opir and Slavka rivers in an area traditionally inhabited by the Boyko highlanders, adjacent to southeast Poland and northeast Slovakia. The mountains surrounding Slavsko are of volcanic origin with forest cover, with an average height of about 1,200 m to 1,400 m.

The town is conveniently located on an important rail line which connects Ukrainian cities with Uzhhorod as well as Slovakia and Hungary.

== History ==
According to tradition, Slavsko takes its name from a band of intrepid warriors of Early East Slavs (Drevlians) led by Prince Sviatoslav Volodymyrovich, one of the ill-fated sons of Vladimir I of Kiev killed by his half-brother Sviatopolk I in 1015. Sviatoslav was attempting to escape to Hungary after the murder of his brothers Boris and Gleb when he was intercepted by Sviatopolk's men and killed in the upper reaches of the Opir River. Opir, incidentally, means "resistance."

Local lore identifying his burial site and stories connecting Danylo Romanovych, Prince of Volhynia and Galicia, to the Boyko Region suggest that the locality figured to an extent in the history of Kievan Rus' and Ukraine. Legend has it that the region was among those ravaged by the rampaging Mongol-Tatar horde led by Batu Khan during its campaign to invade Central Europe in 1240–41. The invasion also saw Kiev, Volodymyr-Volynskyi and Halych destroyed, thus interfering with Danylo's plans for the unification of Ukrainian territories. Material evidence of the village's existence, however, can only be traced back to the year 1483.

Records indicate that the village later belonged to the Potocki family before being transferred to Evhen Kinsky, who then sold it to Baron Hredel.

Following the opening of the railway line between Stryi and Mukachevo in 1878, Slavsko became a popular stop.

Slavsko’s history as a winter sports centre as well as a spa town goes back to the 19th century, when it was part of Galicia – a province of Austria-Hungary. Austrians built hotels in the town, and by 1918, when the town became part of Poland, it was a very popular destination, attended mostly by tourists from nearby city of Lviv. Between 1919 and 1939 several ski lifts and ski platforms were built in Slavsko and its vicinity, most of them on Pohar mountain.

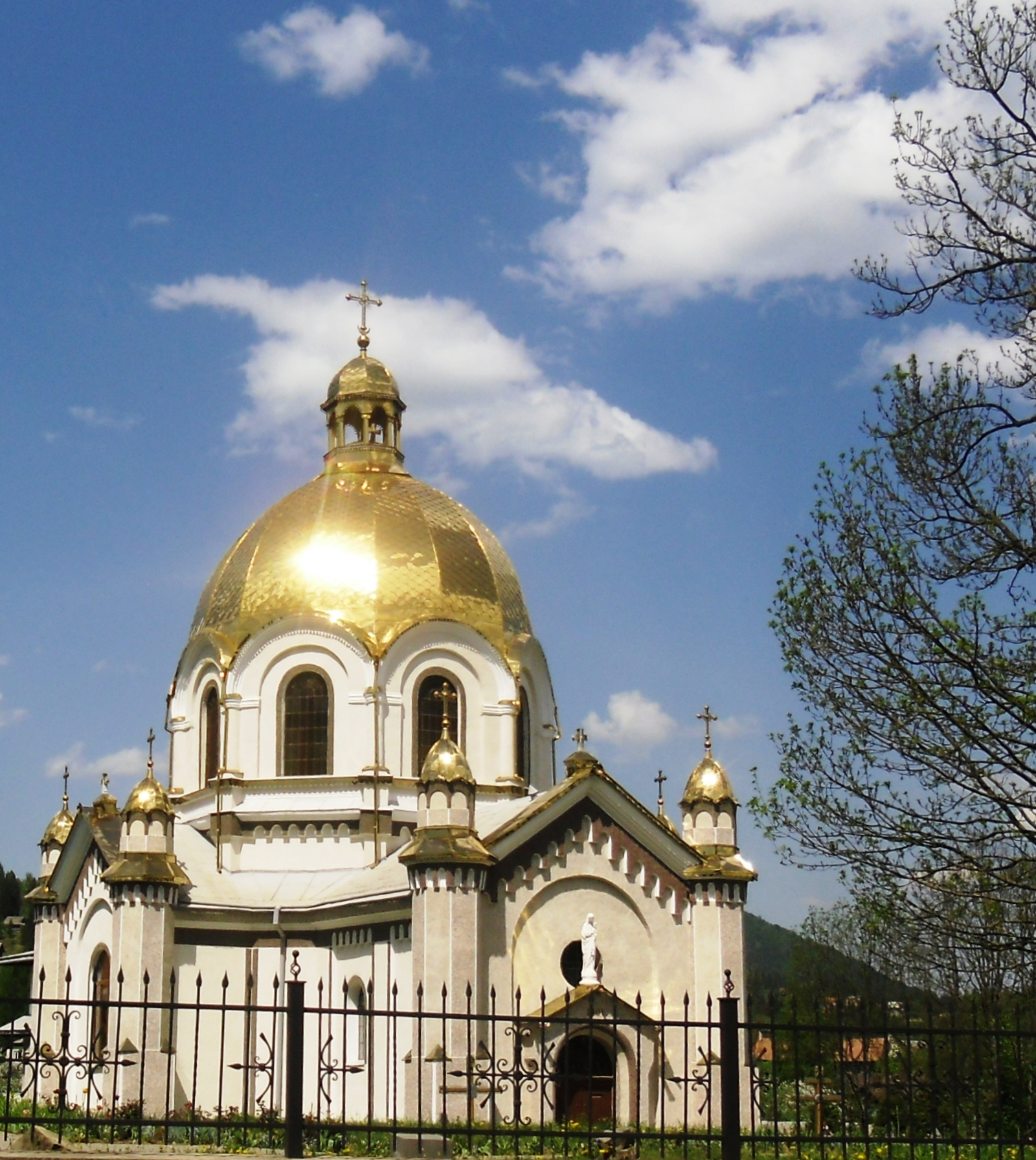
Church the Assumption of the Blessed Virgin Mary (1901)

Until 18 July 2020, Slavsko belonged to Skole Raion. The raion was abolished in July 2020 as part of the administrative reform of Ukraine, which reduced the number of raions of Lviv Oblast to seven. The area of Skole Raion was merged into Stryi Raion.

Until 26 January 2024, Slavsko was designated urban-type settlement. On this day, a new law entered into force which abolished this status, and Slavsko became a rural settlement.

Archival views from the 1930s

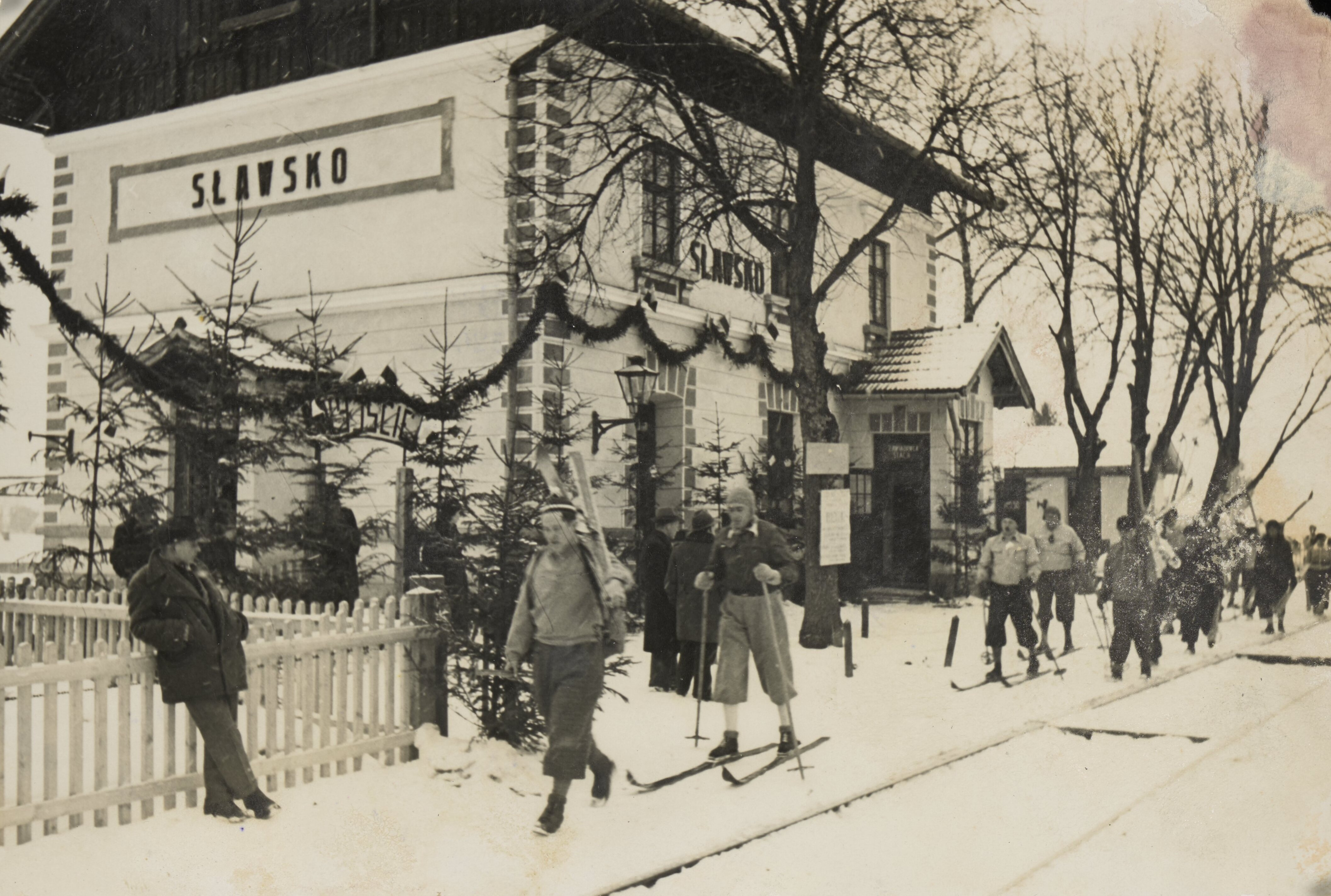
Railway station

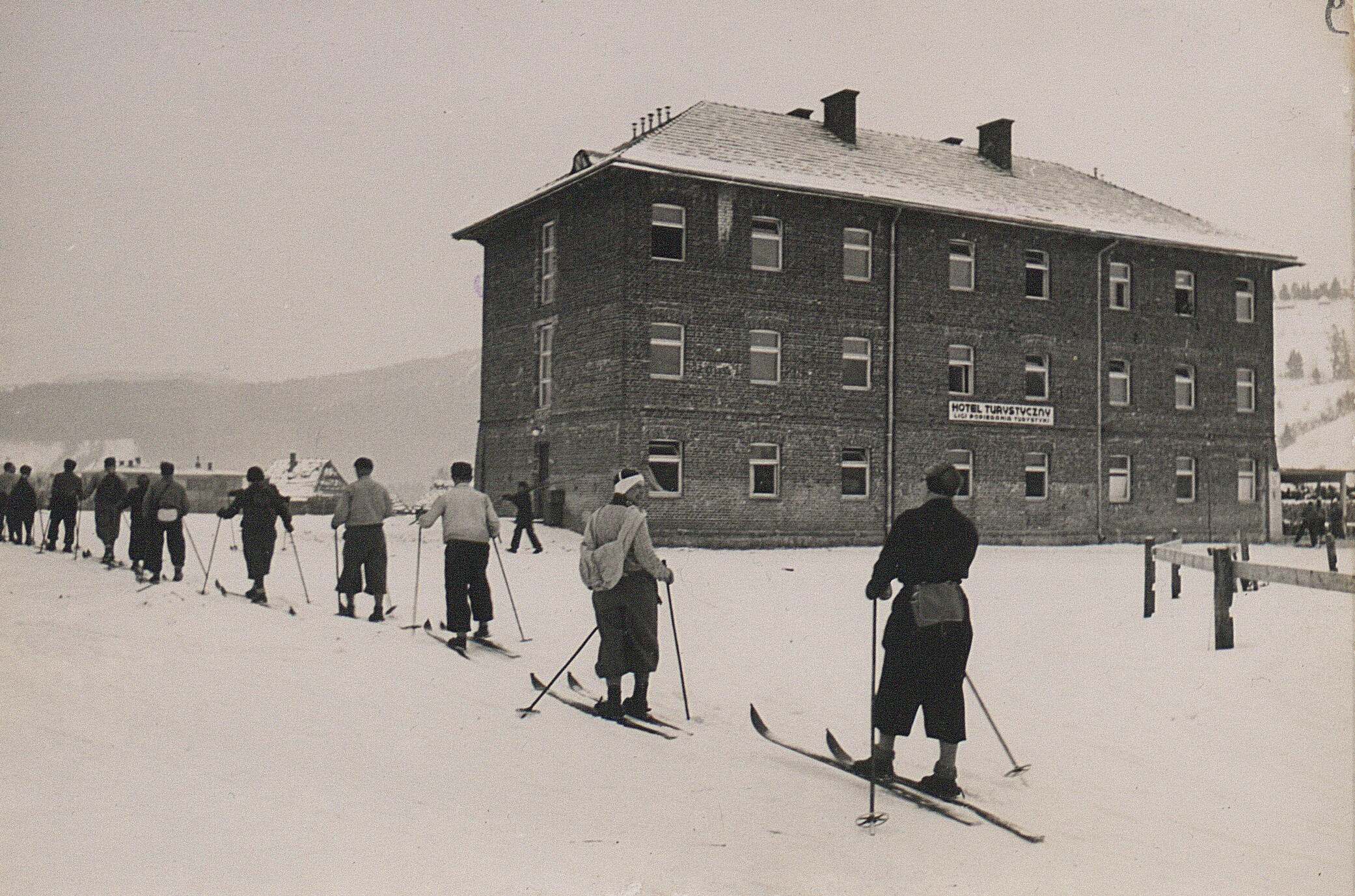
LPT Tourist Hotel

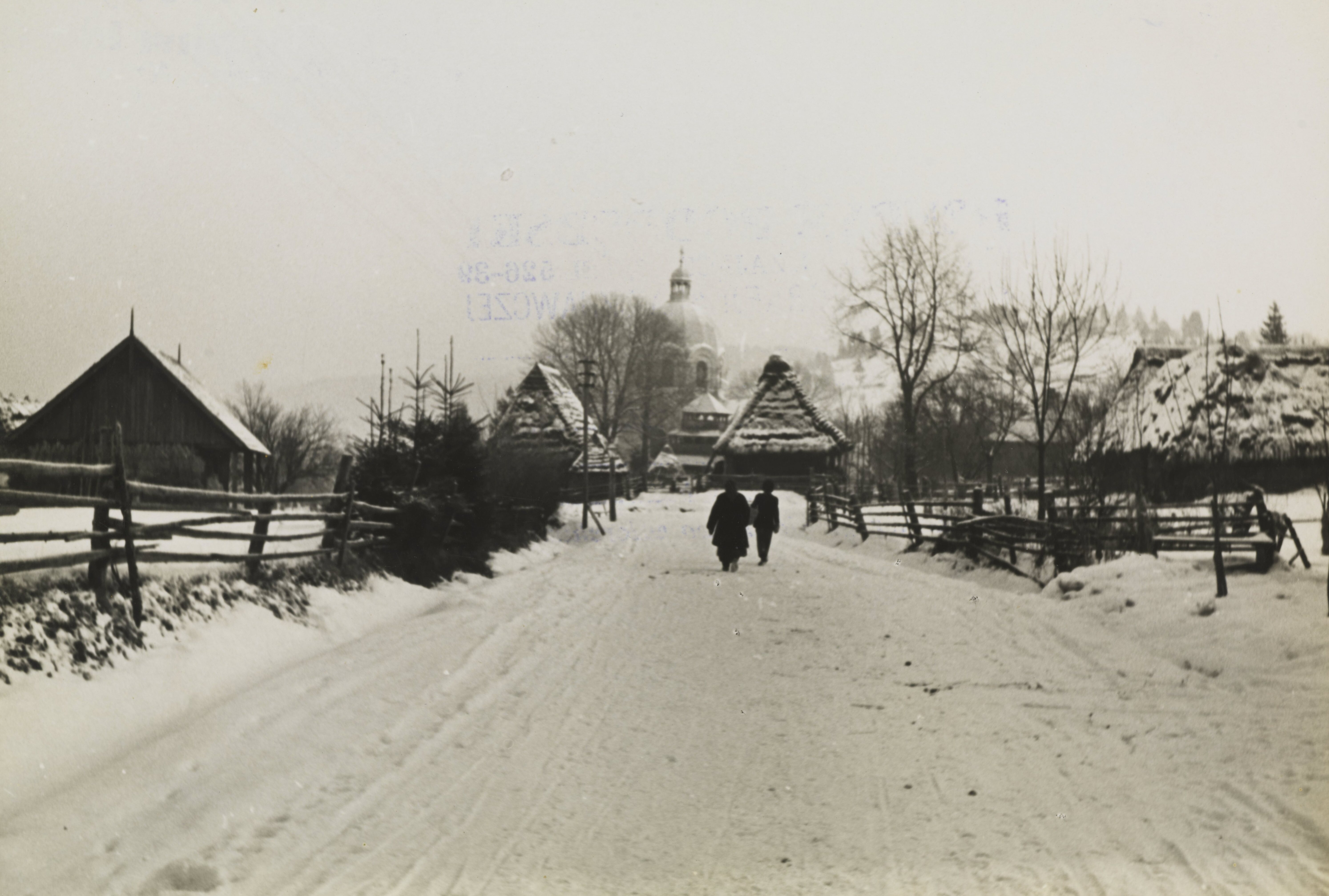
Boyko huts

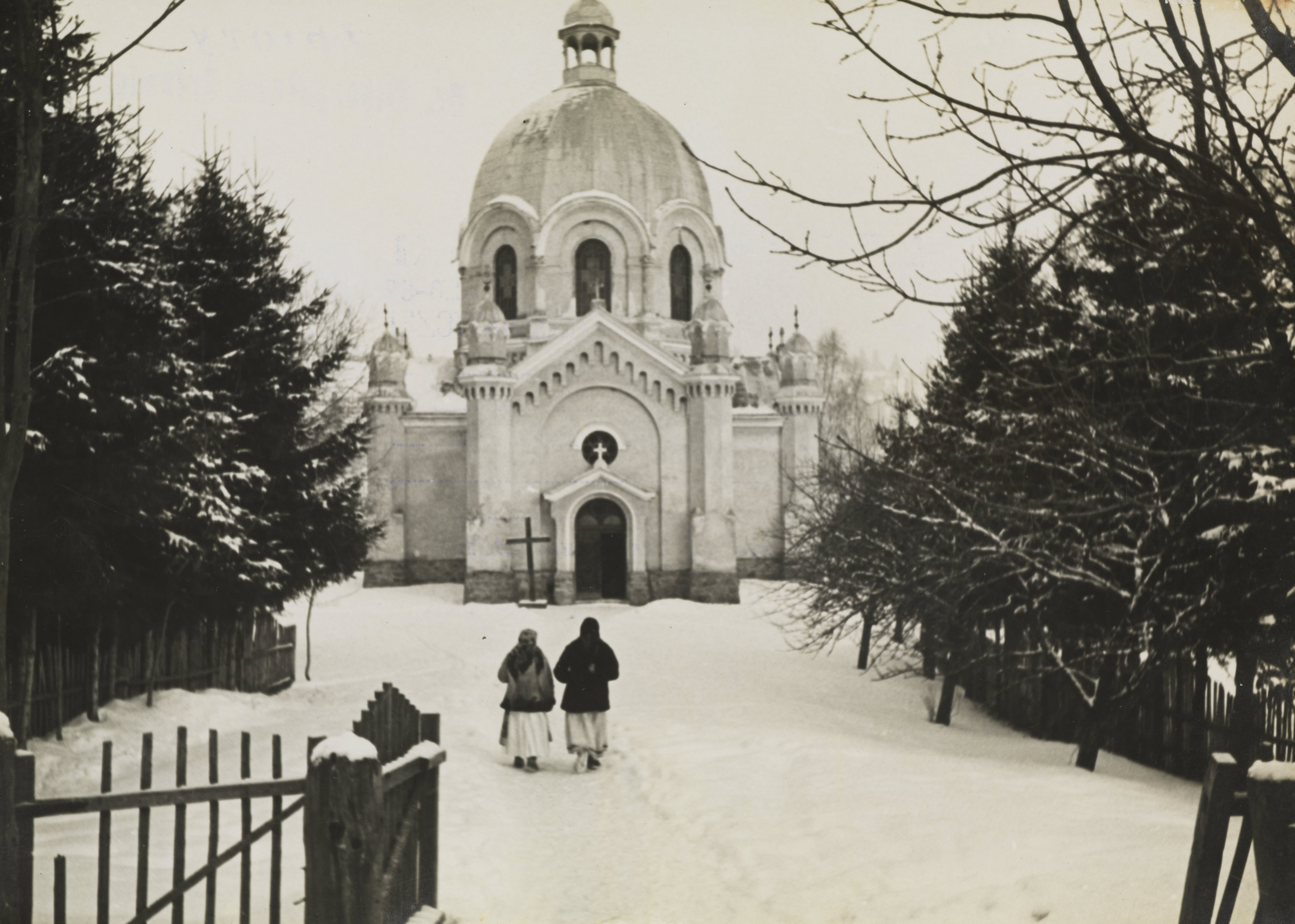
Orthodox church

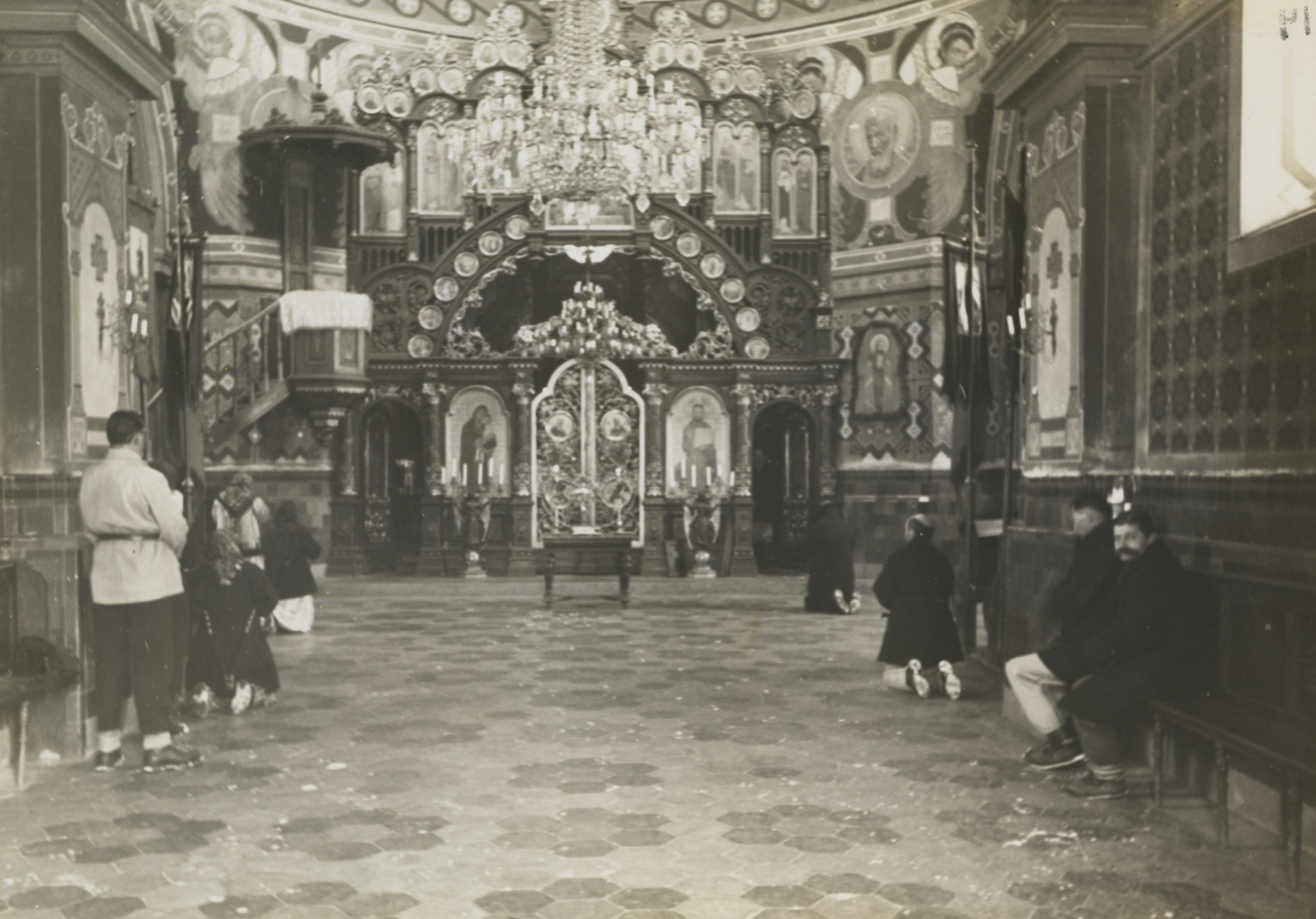
Interior of the Orthodox church

== Leisure ==
Slavsko first became known as a skiing center in the late nineteenth and early twentieth centuries. The first cableways and ski jumps were built in the 1920s and 1930s. It reached the peak of its popularity during the Soviet era when it became the main training grounds of the USSR Olympic team. While its pistes cannot rival those in Western Europe, there are slopes, such as the central ski track operated by the Dinamo sports centre, touted by local authorities as being of international competitive standards.

The best slopes are found on Mt Trostian, which is 1,235 metres above sea level. A new resort is being built on Mt Zvorets, located two kilometres from Slavsko toward Volosianka, which is expected to compete against the Slavsko Trostian resort. The other mountains in the area are Politekh, Pohar, Grabovets and Krokus. The skiing season begins in late November and ends in late March.

In summer, holiday makers engage in fishing as well as walking and riding excursions or berry and mushroom picking.

== Religion ==
- Church of the Assumption (1901, UGCC, brick)
