= Sanok-Turka Mountains =

Mountain range in Poland and Ukraine

Coordinates: 49.3800°N 22.8900°E

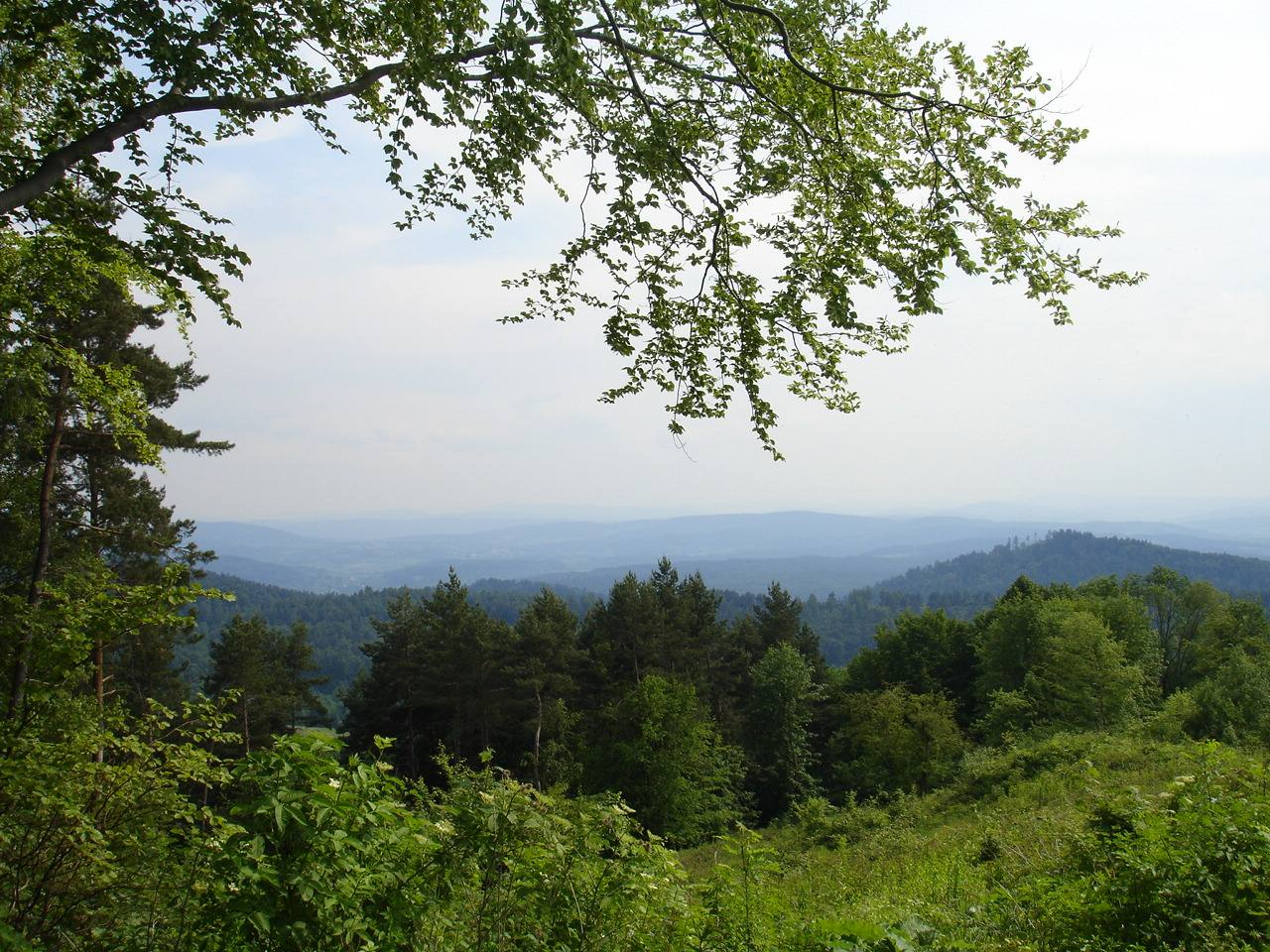

Highest point
- Peak: Magura Łomniańska
- Elevation: 1,024 m (3,360 ft)

Dimensions
- Area: 930 km^{2} (360 mi^{2})

Geography
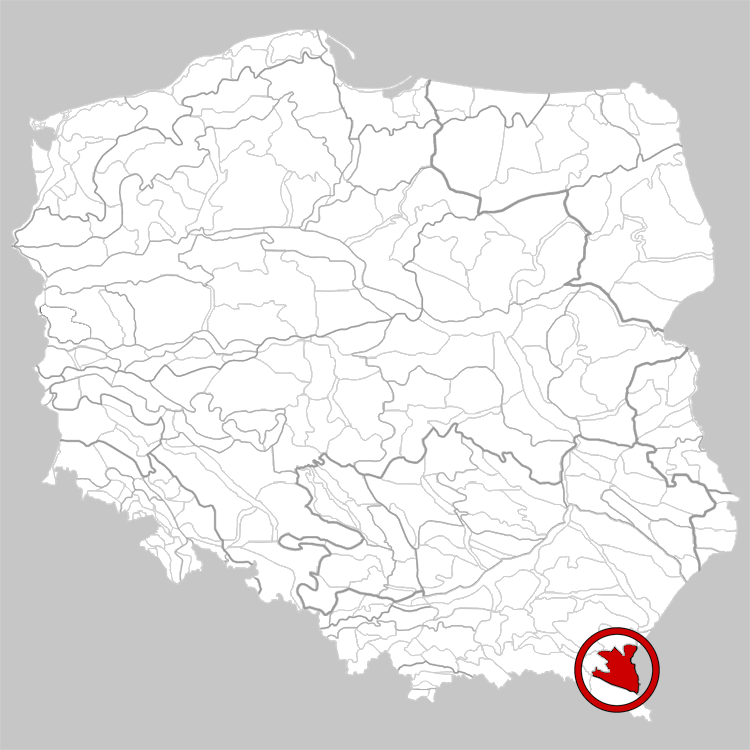
- Part of Sanok-Turka Mountains within Poland
- Countries: Poland and Ukraine
- States: Podkarpackie Voivodeship and Lviv Oblast

The Sanok-Turka Mountains (Polish: Góry Sanocko-Turczańskie), also known as Middle Beskids (Ukrainian: Середній Бескид) are a mountain range in the Eastern Beskids, within the Outer Eastern Carpathians. They are located in southern border section between Poland and Ukraine .

The Sanok-Turka mountain range stretches on an area of 930 km^{2} to the north of the Bieszczady Mountains, and to the south of the Przemyskie Upland, between the valleys of the middle San and Stryi River. They extend after the river Stryi by the Beskidy Brzeżne. The northern boundary is made by the rivers Wiar, Łomna, Stupnica, Leszczawka, Lachawka and Tyrawski, the western valley of the river San. Sometimes the territories to the East and South of the river Wiar, (like the Sucha Obycz Massif), and the east of the Lachawka river valley to the valley of the river San (Wysokiego mountain range) are added to Sanocko-Turczańskie mountains (there are also different variations of the northern border). The southern border is generally carried through the ridges of the Otryt mountain range and through the San where the Tyrawski river joins as a tributary, although sometimes the Otryt mountain range is linked with the Sanocko-Turczańskie mountains, then the southern border is the Upper San river. According to the Encyclopedia of Ukraine, the eastern border of the range runs along the line Turka-Boryslav.

The highest peak of the mountain range is Magura Łomniańska (with a height of 1024 metres), while on the Polish side of the border the highest peak is Jaworniki at 909 metres, (or Trohaniec if you use the expanded border at a height of 939 metres). The characteristics of the mountain range is that they had a straight stretch which is separated by valleys of rivers or streams. The height increase of the mountain range is in the South-Western direction.

== Etymology ==
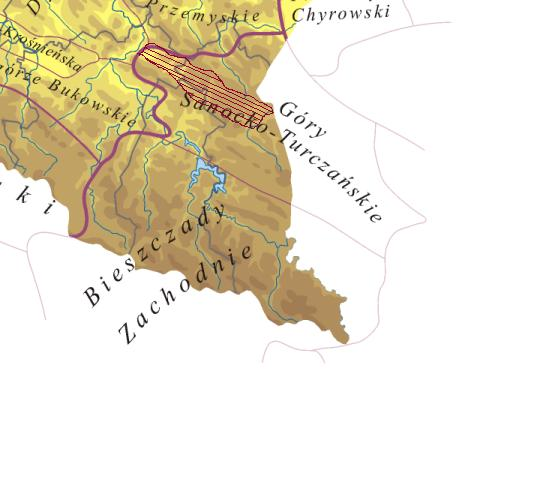
Part of Sanok-Turka Mountains within Poland

In the Middle Ages, these mountains were called Sanocki Mountains; (part of Ukraine Samborski Mountains) or Sarmacki Mountains. In the German historiography as Sanoker Berge, Berge Saana and Samborer Berge.

According to the story of Tacitus, this area was described as Bastarnae Alpes, qui alias Carpathia Montes on the outskirts of the Hercynian Forest.

The second part of the current name comes from the town of Turka.

== Events ==
- According to the Hypatian Codex, in the spring of 1099 the Hungarian King Coloman crossed the Carpathian Mountains hitting the Kingdom of Galicia–Volhynia, where at the Battle of Wiar he suffered a spectacular defeat. Even in the sixteenth century Hungarian writers have argued that no defeat is not greater than that of their nation. According to Jan Długosz this battle had killed more than 8,000 Hungarians.
- In 1377, Louis I of Hungary and Poland, crossed through the Sanok Mountains heading to Russia against the Lithuanian troops.
- In 1941, the Molotov Line intersecting the mountains crashed German-Slovak troops in the Operation Barbarossa.

== See also ==
- Ukrainian Carpathians
- Wooded Carpathians
- Stryi-San Highland
- Divisions of the Carpathians
