= Stupnica =

Stupnica may refer to:

- Stupnica (Leskovac), a village in Jablanica District, Serbia
- Stupnica (Loznica), a village in Mačva District, Serbia
- Stupnica (river), in Poland
