= Sołotwa =

Location
- Country: Poland

Physical characteristics
- Mouth
  - location: Lubaczówka
  - coordinates: 50°08′47″N 23°07′13″E

Basin features
- Progression: Lubaczówka→ San→ Vistula→ Baltic Sea

Sołotwa (also: Słotwa) is a river of Poland, a tributary of the Lubaczówka in Lubaczów.
