= Tyrawa =

Tyrawa may refer to the following places in Poland:

- Tyrawa Solna
- Tyrawa Wołoska
