= Tukhlia =

Village in Lviv Oblast, Ukraine

Tukhlia Ту́хля
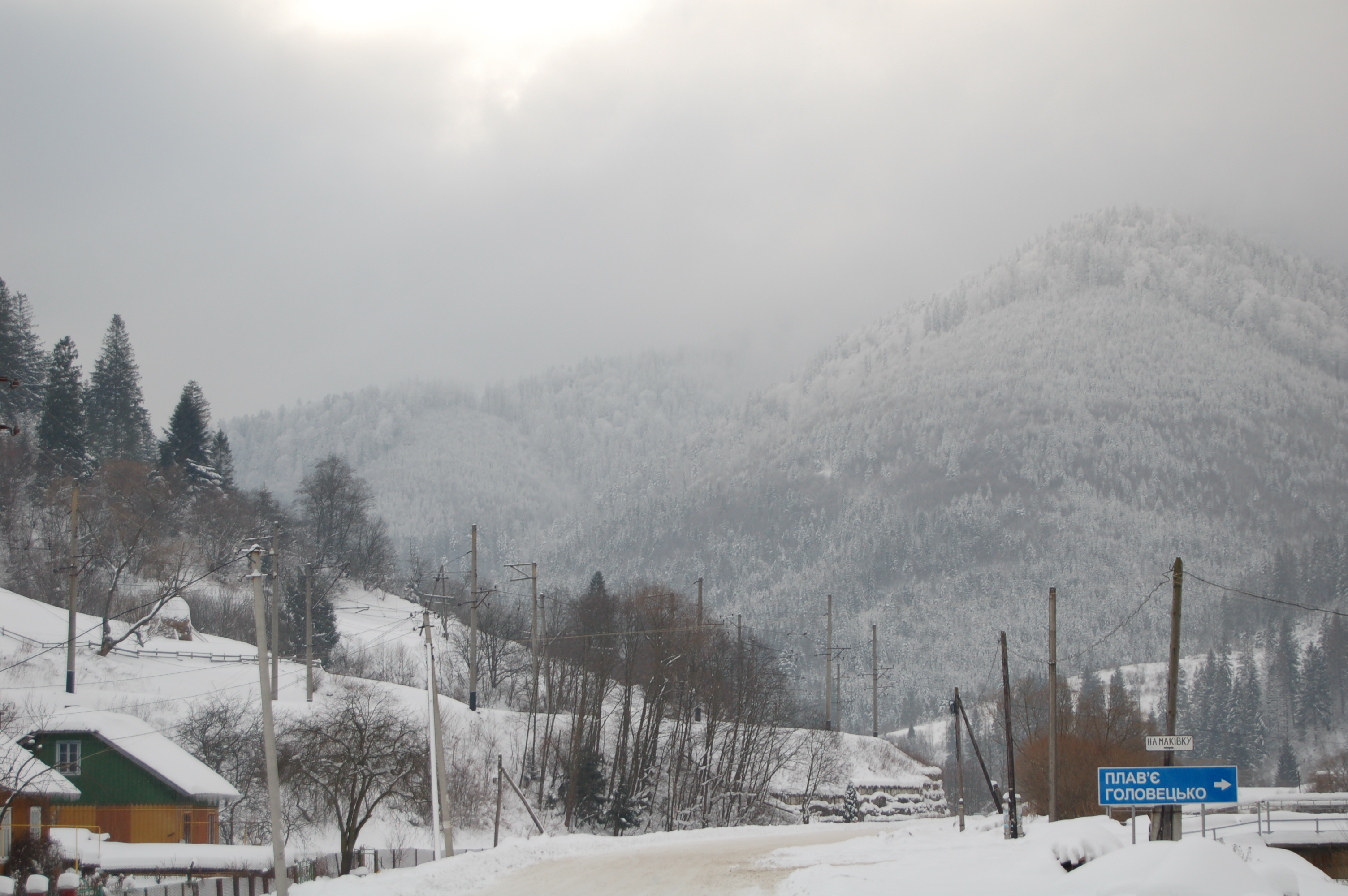
- Winter on the northern outskirts of Tukhlia

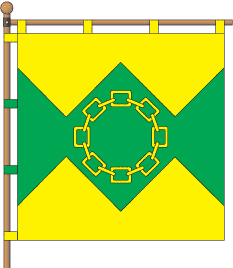
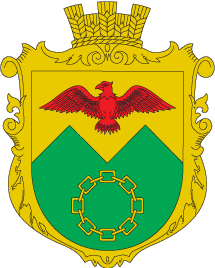
- Flag Coat of arms

- Location within Lviv Oblast Location within Ukraine
- Coordinates: 48°55′5″N 23°28′19″E
- Country: Ukraine
- Oblast: Lviv Oblast
- Raion: Stryi (2020—); Skole (until 2020)
- Council: Tukhlyanska Rural Council
- First mentioned: 1397

Area
  - Total: 3.78 km^{2} (1.46 sq mi)
- Elevation: 533 m (1,749 ft)

Population (2001)
  - Total: ▲1,752
- Postal code: 82632
- Area code: +380 3251

Tukhlya or Tukhlia (Ukrainian: Ту́хля) is a village (selo) in Ukraine, in Stryi Raion of Lviv Oblast. It belongs to Slavske settlement hromada, one of the hromadas of Ukraine. The population was 1752 as of the 2001 census.

The village lies in the narrow valley of the river Opir. Within the village, two of the river's relatively large tributaries, the Tsyhla and the Holovchanka, flow into the Opir. On the north-eastern outskirts of the village, the Kobylets creek flows into the Opir.

== Etymology ==
There are two proposed origins for the name of the village, although they may qualify as pseudo-etymologies. The first derives the toponym from a Slavic root meaning "foul-smelling" (cf. Ukrainian тухлий, tukhlyi). According to one version, this name allegedly came about due to the stench of the corpses of vanquished Mongol-Tatar invaders.

The other story involves an old man who became exhausted in the course of traveling and decided to settle down in Tukhlia. Later, officials ask him the name of the village, and he responds by explaining that it had no name, he was just tired and decided to stay there. According to this story, the name would derive from the Ukrainian verb охлянути (okhlianuty, "to be exhausted").

== History ==
In the second half of the 1880s, the Stryi–Mukachevo railway was laid through the village. The village has its own railway station, with adjacent stops in Hrebeniv (to the north) and in Slavske (south), a famous ski resort. Due to the fact that it is convenient to get here (either from Lviv or Zakarpattia), ecotourism has developed in the village. From Tukhlya it is convenient to climb the surrounding mountains, in particular the eastern part of the Zelemyanka ridge (from the northern end of the village): Kindrat (height of 1,158 metres (3,799 ft), wide summit, forestless), Soligan (941 metres (3,087 ft)), Yarovyshche (909 metres (2,982 ft)), Makivka (958 metres (3,143 ft)) or Kliva (1,072 metres (3,517 ft)).

Tukhlya is closely connected with the life and work of Ivan Franko. The village became famous for being described by Franko in his novel Zakhar Berkut. In Tukhlya there is a well dedicated to Ivan Franko, a monument to the writer, as well as a church painted by Kornylo Ustiyanovych. The mountainous area around the village is the site of historical events, which are described in Franko's novel. On a mountain in the southern outskirts of the village, behind the river Opir, there stands a statue of Zakhar Berkut—exactly where, according to folklore, the historical figure was buried. There is a stone in the village, said to be the one that blocked the mountain stream that drowned the Mongol-Tatar invaders. A commemorative inscription was carved on it.

Стародавнє село Тухля — се була велика гірська оселя з двома чи трьома чималими присілками, всього коло півтора тисячі душ. Село й присілки лежали не там, де лежить теперішня Тухля, але геть вище серед гір, у просторій подовжній долині, що тепер поросла лісом і зоветься Запалою долиною.

The ancient village of Tukhlya was a large mountain dwelling with two or three large settlements, only about one and a half thousand souls. The village and hamlets did not lie where the present-day Tukhlya lies, but higher up among the mountains, in a vast longitudinal valley that is now overgrown with forest and is called the "Sunken Valley".

— Ivan Franko, Zakhar Berkut

Ivan Franko's work relies on some historical facts, such as the names of the leaders of the Mongol-Tatars, and another source of writing the story was Carpathian folklore. The particular account of the sinking of the Mongols in the Carpathians is not known to history. The 2019 film The Rising Hawk was also made on the basis of the story.

Until 18 July 2020, Tukhlya belonged to Skole Raion. The raion was abolished in July 2020 as part of the administrative reform of Ukraine, which reduced the number of raions of Lviv Oblast to seven. The area of Skole Raion was merged into Stryi Raion.

== Demographics ==
According to the 1989 Soviet census, the population of the village was 1812 residents, of whom 907 were men and 905 were women.

At the time of the 2001 Ukrainian census, 1752 people lived in the village.

=== Language ===
Population distribution by mother tongue according to the 2001 census:

Language	Percentage
Ukrainian	99.40%
Russian	0.55%
Moldovan	0.05%

== Transportation ==
Regional and suburban trains stop at Tukhlia station.

== Sites of interest ==
The following locations are recognized heritage sites:

- Ivan Franko memorial well — a well from which Ivan Franko allegedly drank
- Kremin nature reserve — a tract of 324 hectares (800 acres) of spruce, fir, and beech forest, located to the northwest of Tukhlya, on the slopes of the Beskids.
- Tukhlyanske nature reserve — a forest area of 18 hectares (44 acres) to the northwest of the village
- Koblyets nature reserve — a forest area of 58.8 hectares (145 acres) to the northwest of the village

=== Mount Zakhar (or Putyshche) ===
The official name of the mountain is Putyshche (Ukrainian: Путище). The people left a statue on behalf of Zakhar Berkut on the summit, exactly where, according to legend, the historical figure is buried. The height of the mountain is 835.5 metres (2,741 ft).

== Notable people ==
- Holomsha Mykola Yaroslavovych (1962) — Ukrainian lawyer and politician.
- Dasiv Bohdan Ivanovych (1935–2002) — Ukrainian Soviet poet.
- Drabyshynets Vasyl Mykolayovych (1942–2008) — poet.
- Ohrodnik-Zhylava Anastaziya (1908–2009) — professor of music, public figure.
- Shchekun Andriy Stepanovych (1973) — Ukrainian journalist and public figure.
