= Stryi-San Highland =

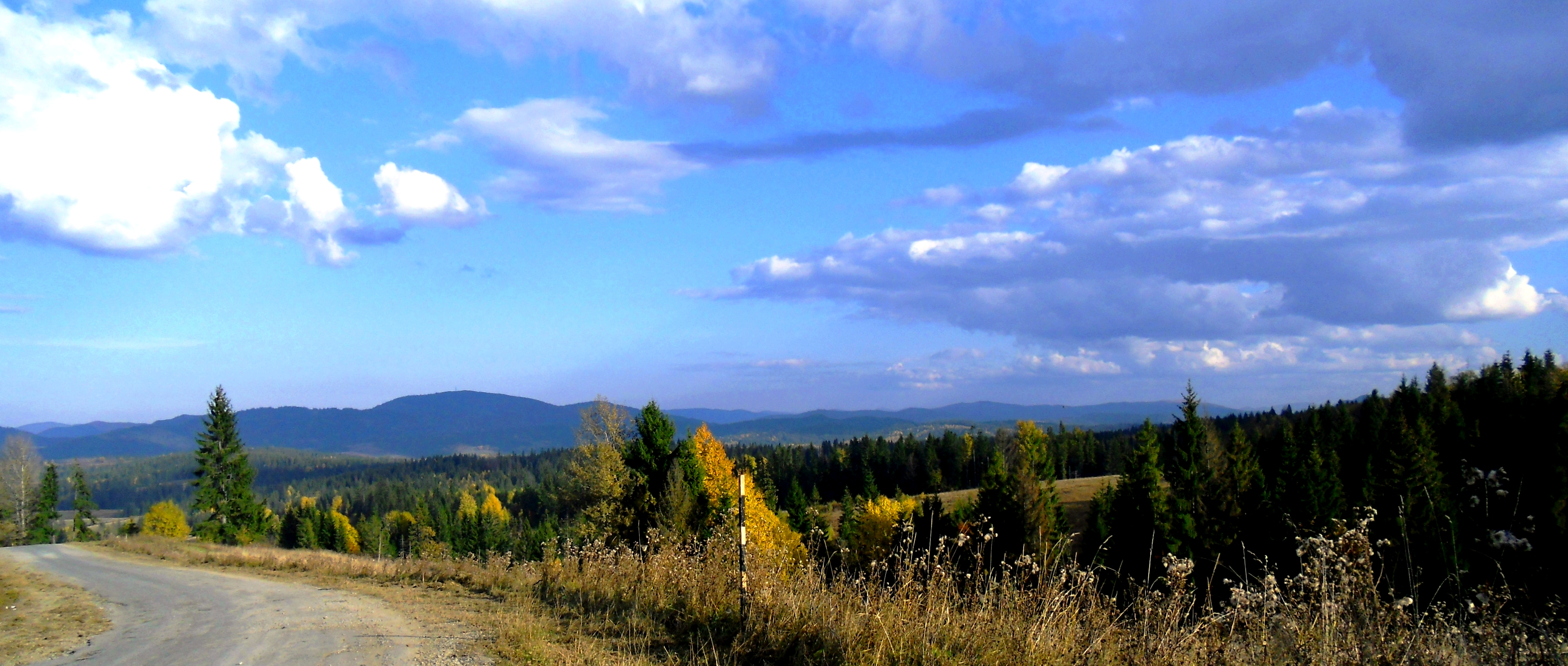
Part of the Eastern Carpathians

Stryi-San Highland (Ukrainian: Стрийсько-Сянська Верховина, romanized: Stryjs'ko-S'ans'ka Verxovyna) is a part of Eastern Beskids within Sambir and Stryi Raions, Lviv Oblast.

Stryi-San Highland is part of the Eastern Carpathians and is located in the upper reaches of rivers Opir River, Stryi River and San River.

There are protected areas within the territory: Nadsianskyi Regional Landscape Park, zakazniks Pikui Reserve and Berdo Reserve.

== Gallery ==
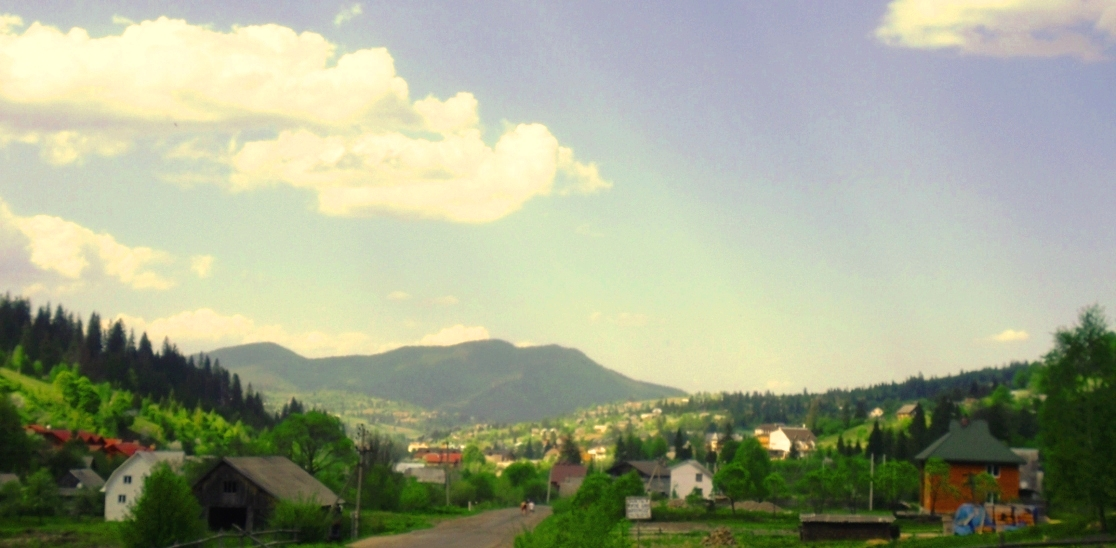
Southern slope of the Trostyan Mountain.

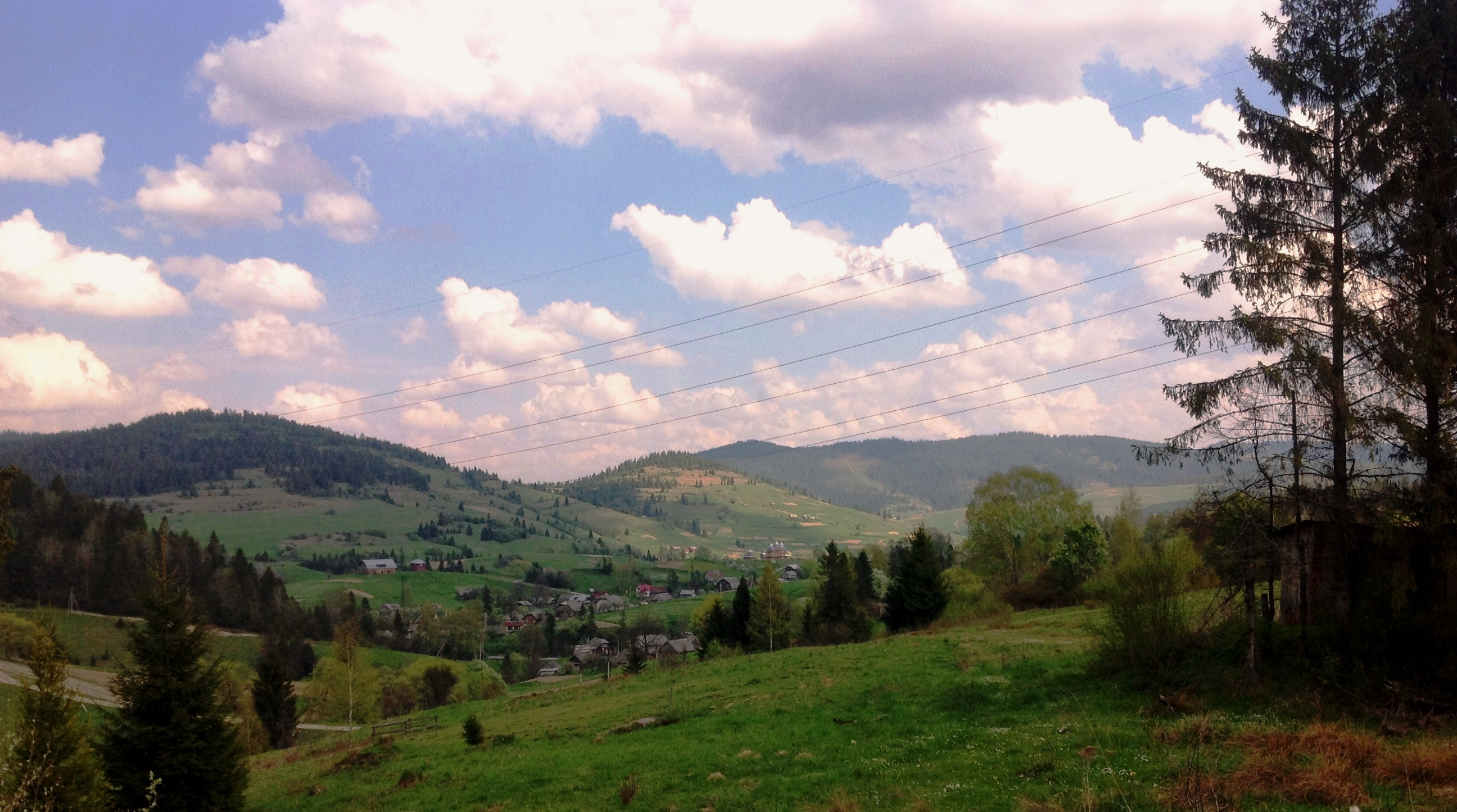
View of the village Plavie (Skole Raion)

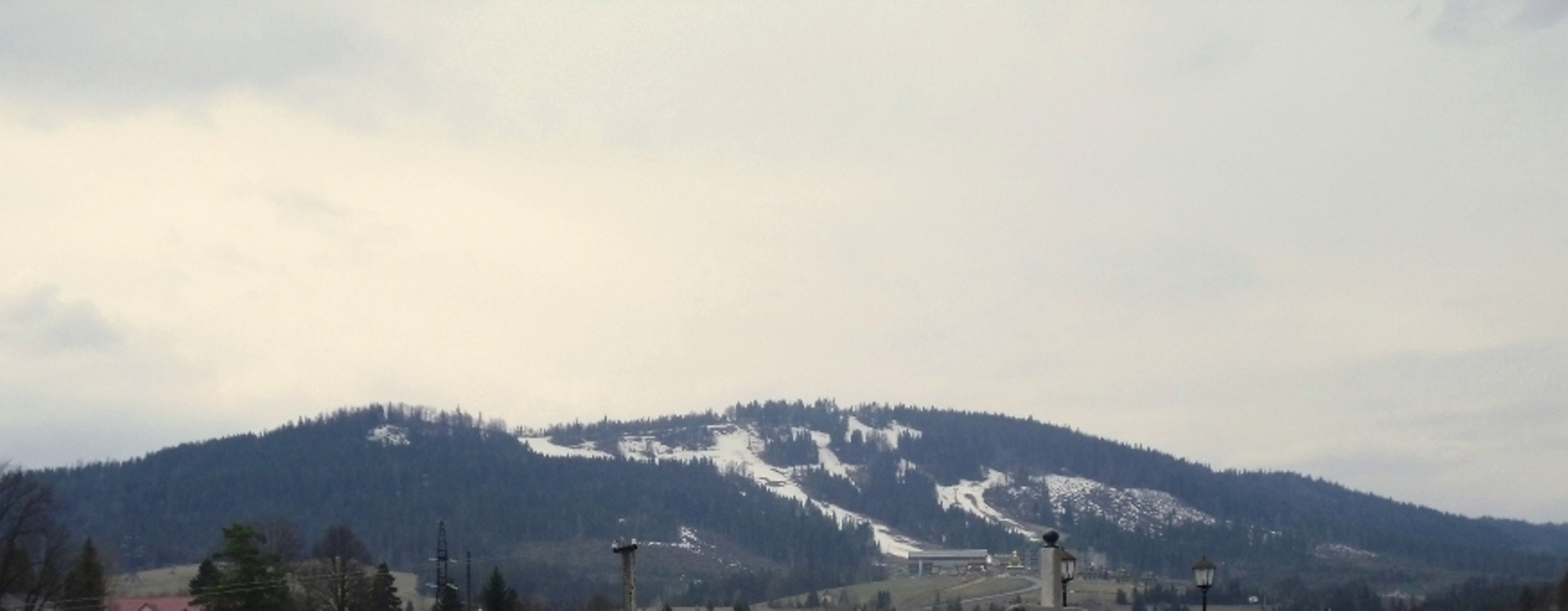
The mountain range Dovzhky in Skole district.

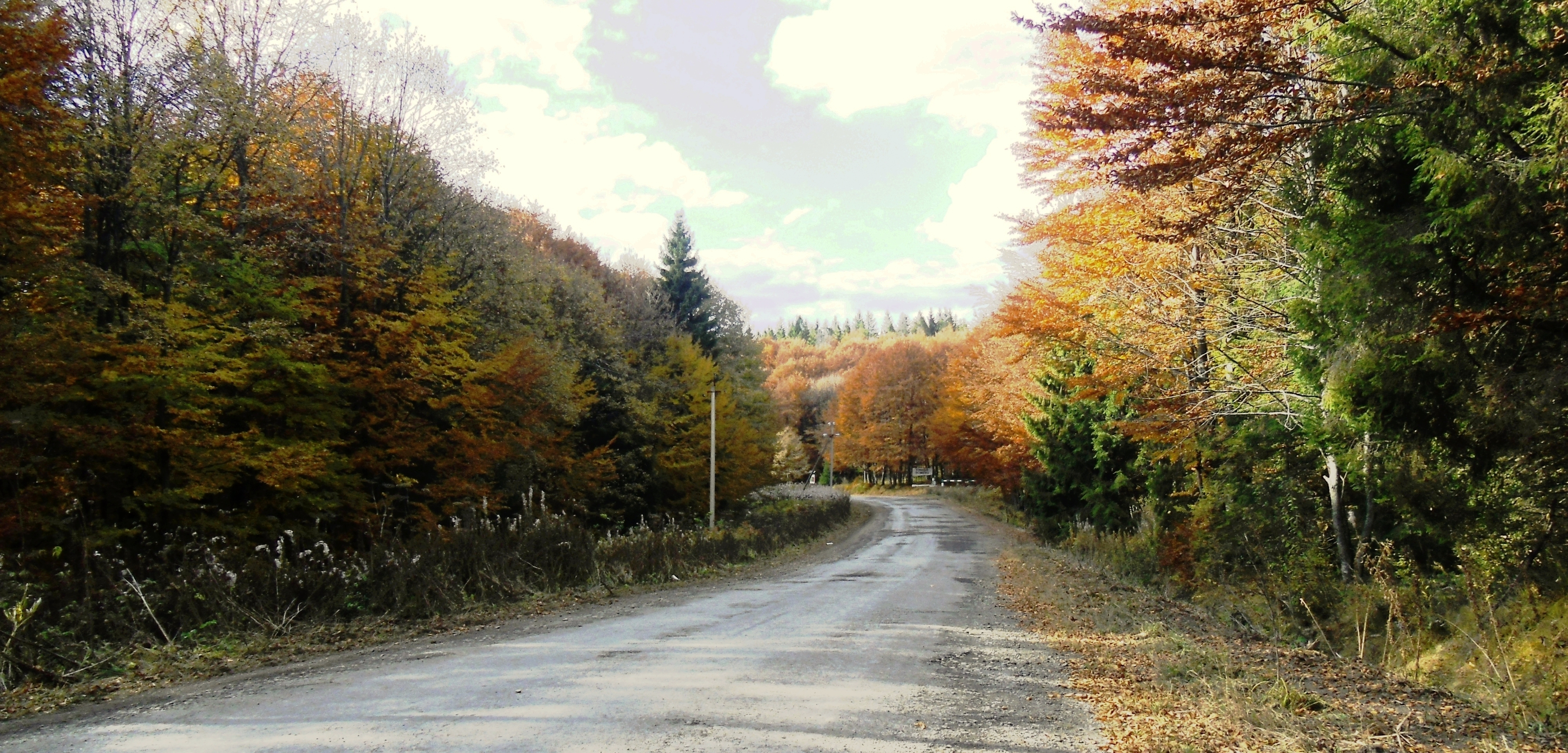
Mountain road in the Skole Beskids.

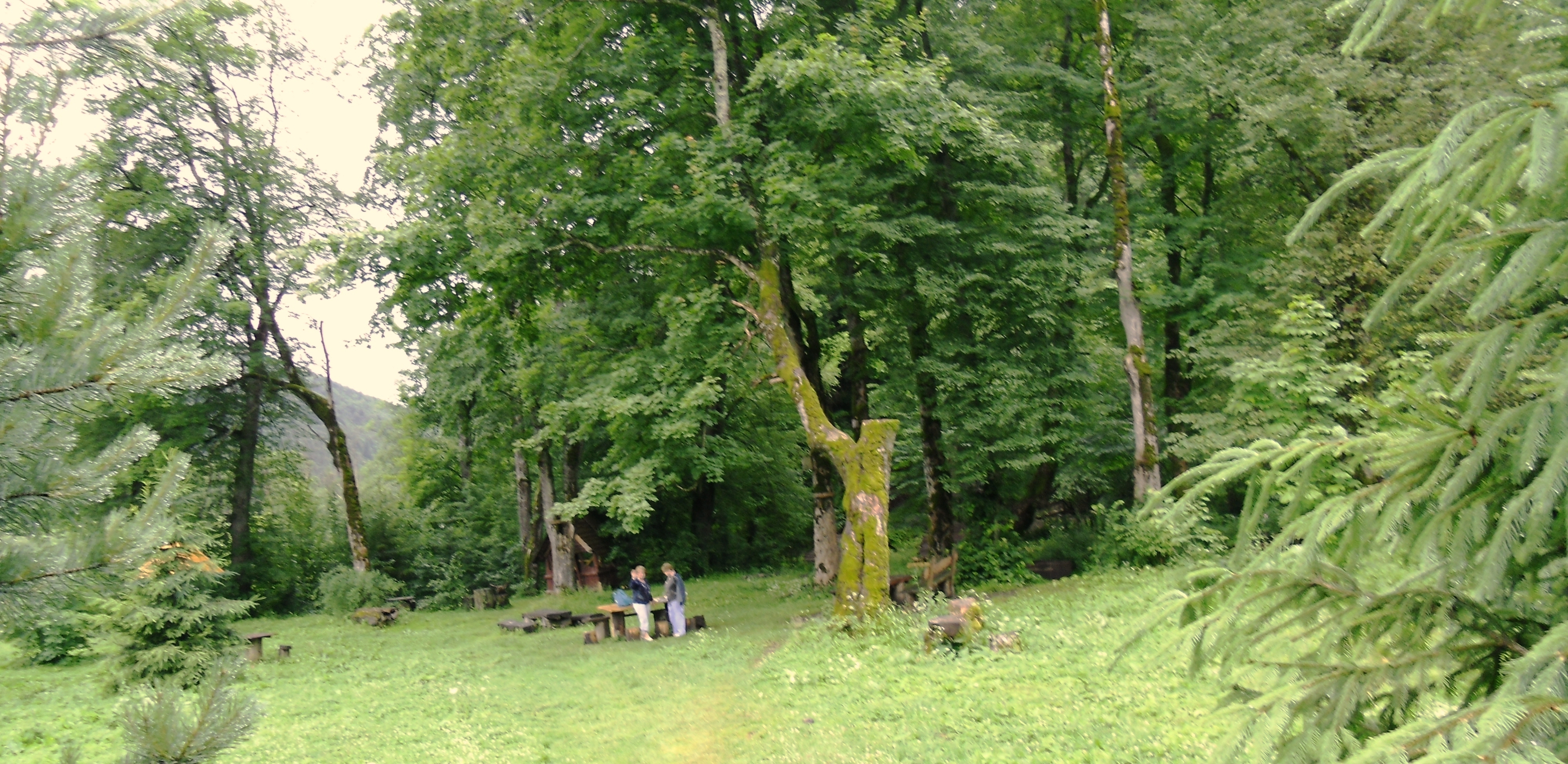
Resting place

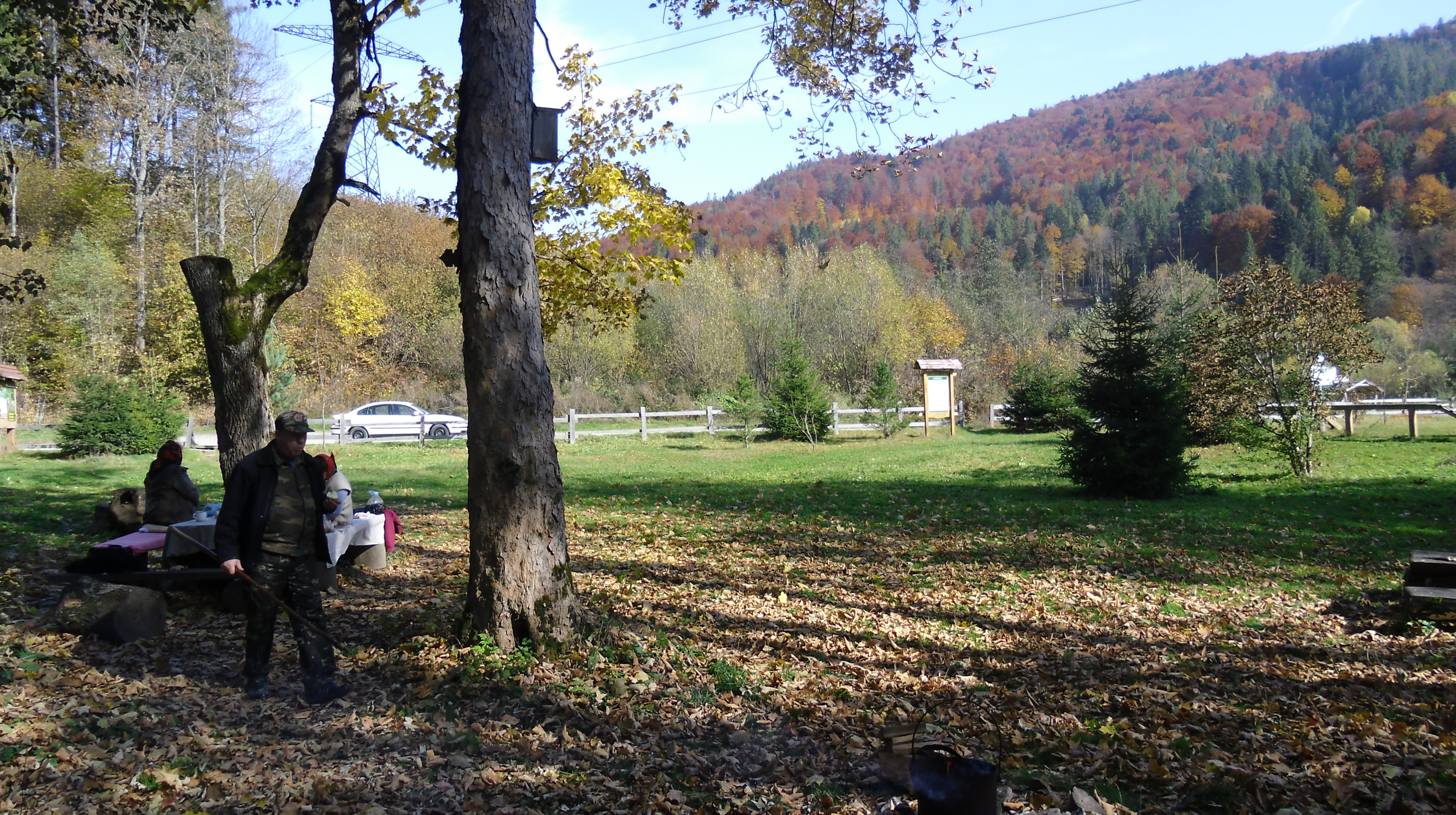
Recreation in Ukrainian Carpathians

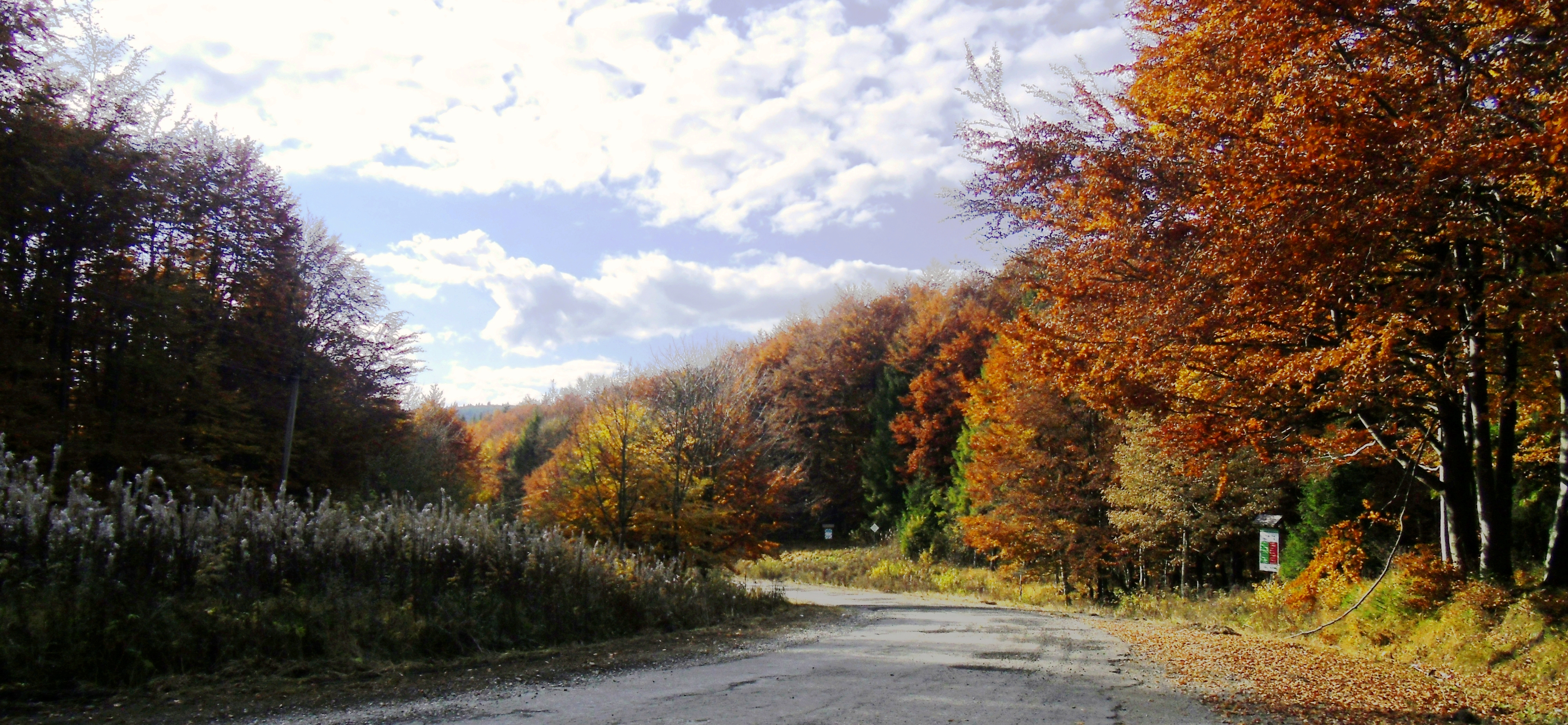
Klymets Natural Preserve in the “Skole Beskids”.
