= Lubaczówka =

Lubaczówka Завадівка

Location
- Country: Poland, Ukraine

Physical characteristics
- Mouth
  - location: San
  - coordinates: 50°07′11″N 22°38′37″E

Basin features
- Progression: San→ Vistula→ Baltic Sea

Lubaczówka, also known as Zavadivka (Ukrainian: Завадівка) in its upper course in Ukraine, is a river in Ukraine and Poland, a right tributary of the San. It flows through Lubaczów. Its length is 88.2 km.

== See also ==
- Sołotwa
