= Opir (river) =

River in Lviv Oblast, Ukraine

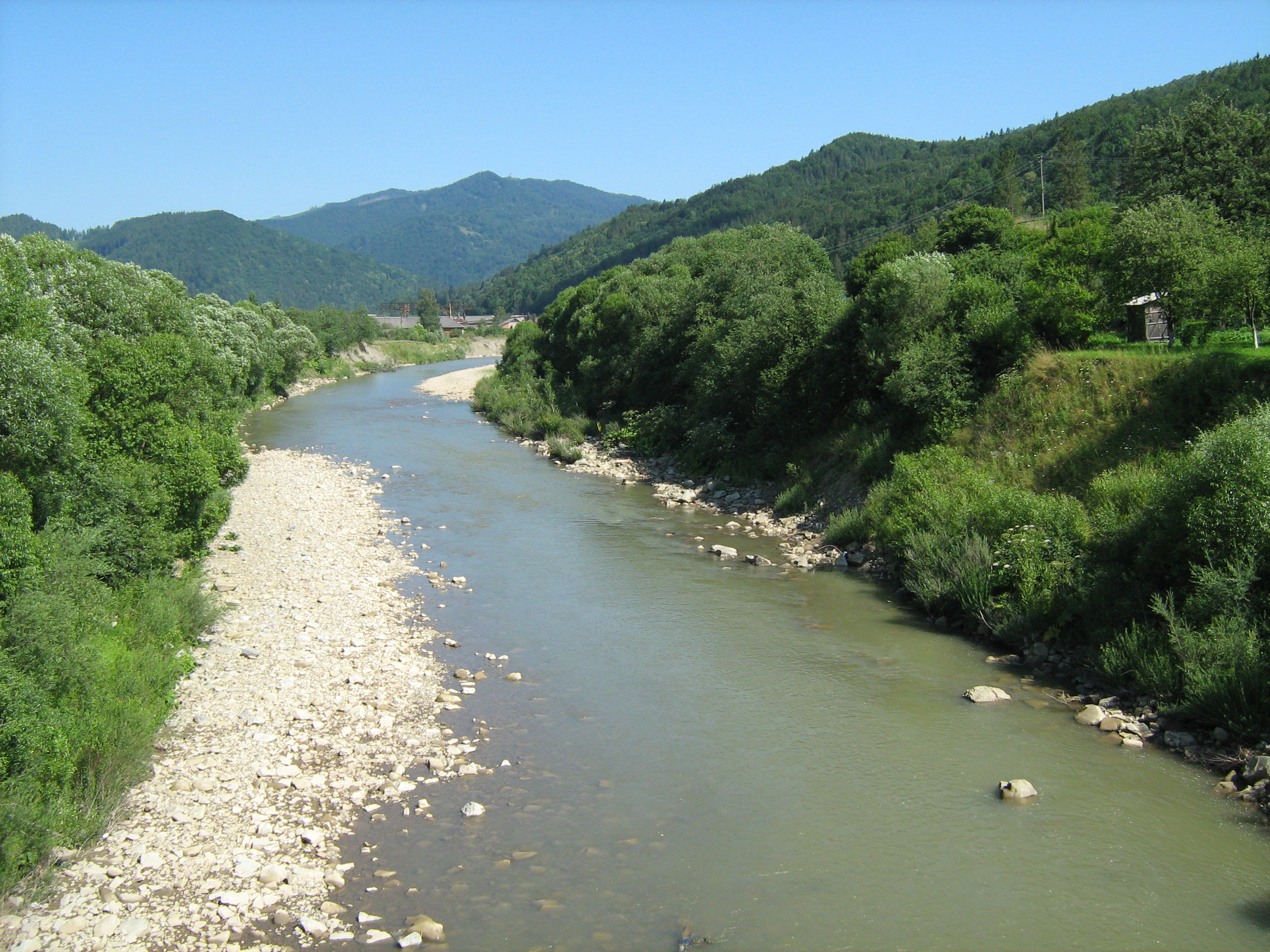
- The Opir River near Hrebeniv, 2008
- Native name: Опір (Ukrainian)

Location
- Country: Ukraine
- Oblast: Lviv Oblast

Physical characteristics
- Source
  - location: near Oporets
  - coordinates: 48°47′49.6″N 23°17′14.3″E
  - elevation: 975 m (3,199 ft)
- Mouth: Stryi
  - location: near Verkhnie Synovydne
  - coordinates: 49°06′45.0″N 23°35′40.9″E
  - elevation: 370 m (1,210 ft)
- Length: 58 km (36 mi)
- Basin size: 843 km^{2} (325 sq mi)

Basin features
- Progression: Stryi→ Dniester→ Dniester Estuary→ Black Sea
- Tributaries
  - left: Oriava; Holovchanka
  - right: Slavka; Rozhanka

The Opir (Ukrainian: Опір) is a river in Ukraine, within Stryi Raion of Lviv Oblast. It is a right tributary of the river Stryi (Dniester basin).

== Geography ==
The Opir River originates on the eastern slope of Velykyi Yavirnyk Mountain (Ukrainian: Великий Явірник) in the Verkhovynskyi Range, south of the village of Oporets. It runs between the mountains of the Skole Beskids, mainly to the northeast and north. It flows into the Stryi River between the town of Verkhnie Synovydne and the village of Mezhybrody.

The Opir is 58 kilometres (36 mi) long, with a basin size of 843 km^{2} (325 sq mi). Its average stream gradient is 10.4 m/km (55 ft/mi). The river flows in a V-shaped valley, with a width varying between 150 m (490 ft) and 300 m (980 ft) in the lower reaches. The floodplain is bilateral, sometimes unilateral, with a width ranging from 30 metres (98 ft) to 425 metres (1,394 ft). The shores are steep and occasionally swampy. The stream bed is rocky, with a width of 10 metres (33 ft) to 80 metres (260 ft), and a depth of 0.2 metres (7.9 in) to 1.2 metres (3 ft 11 in). The bottom is usually lined with pebbles of Carpathian sandstones. The river supplies water for settlements and for the irrigation of agricultural lands.

Recently, the river has become popular among tourists who go rafting.

== Tributaries ==
Eight small rivers and 31 streams with a total length of 94.3 kilometres (58.6 mi) and an area of 21.9 hectares (54 acres) flow into the river.

- Right: Kamianka, Chudyliv, Pavliv, Hrebenovets, Zelemyanka, Tsihla, Rozhanka, Slavka, Khokhlinsky, Pysarivka, Oporets.
- Left: Zakuty, Lavochanka, Dubrivka, Oriava, Yakhystiv, Holovchanka, Rovina.

== Settlements ==
Several settlements are located on the river (in order from the source to the mouth): Oporets, Lavochne, Ternavka, Slavske, Tukhlia, Hrebeniv, Skole, Dubyna, Verkhnie Synovydne.

== Gallery ==
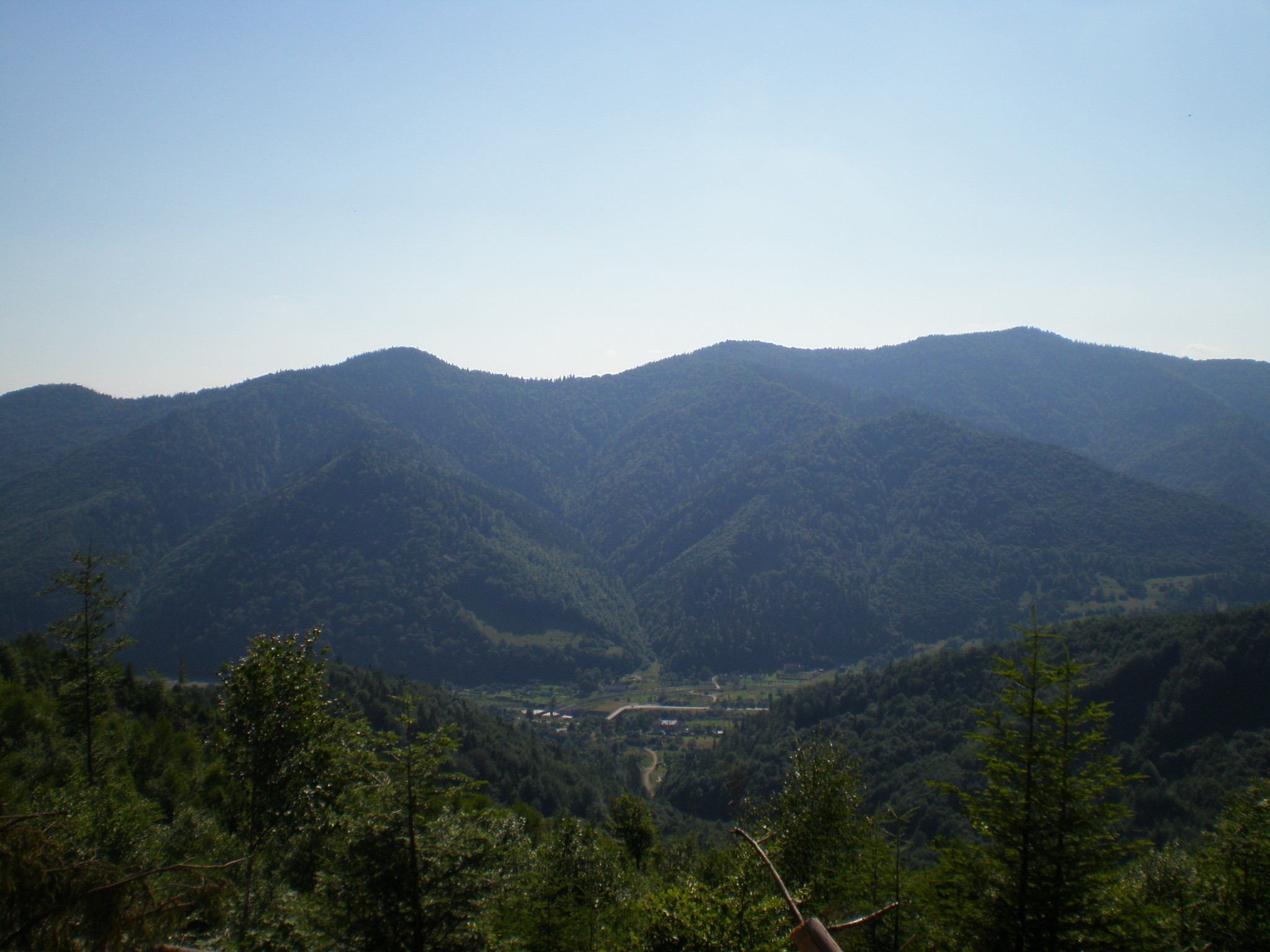
Opir river valley (view from the Zelemyanka ridge).

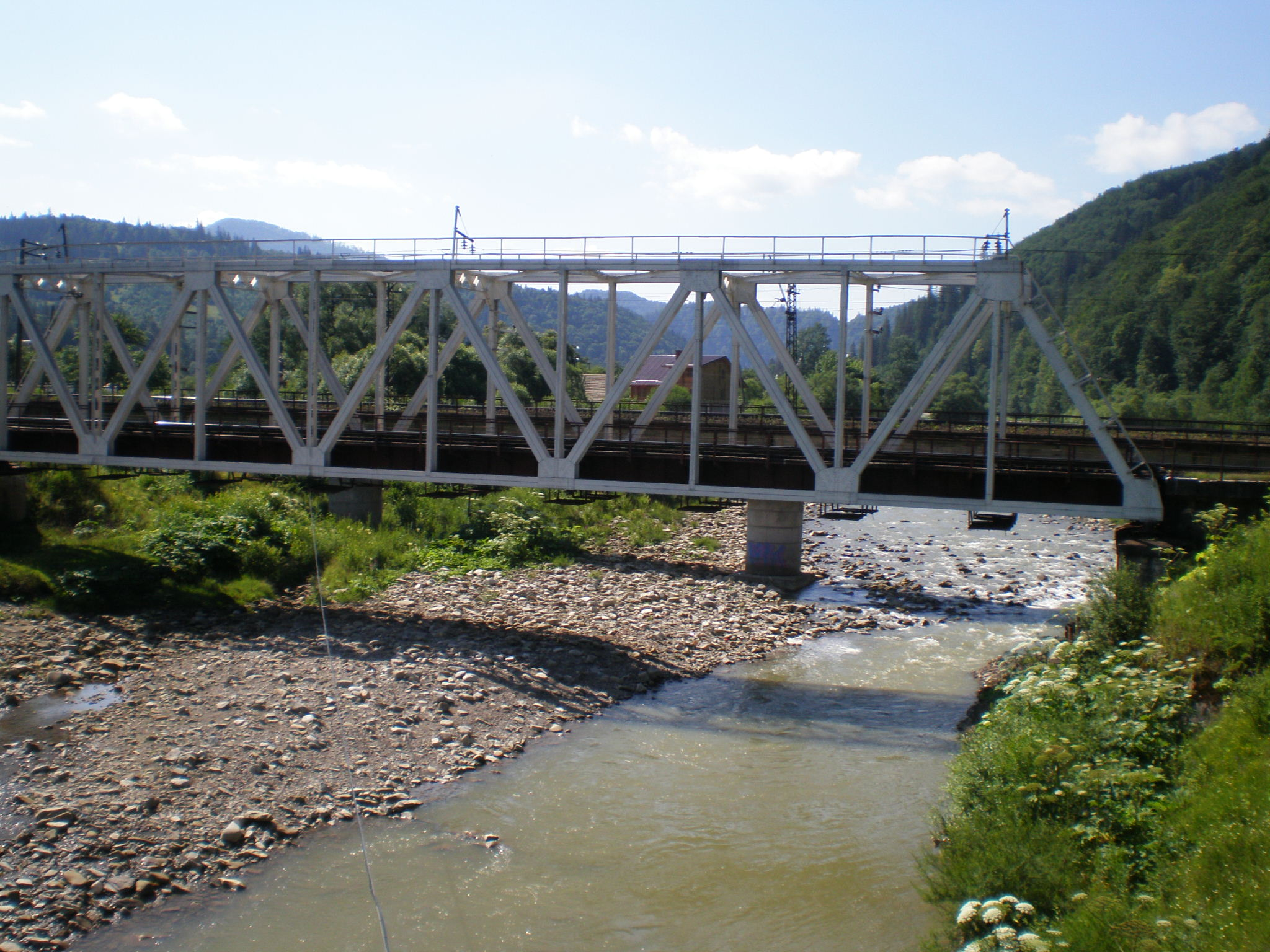
Railway bridge on the Opir.

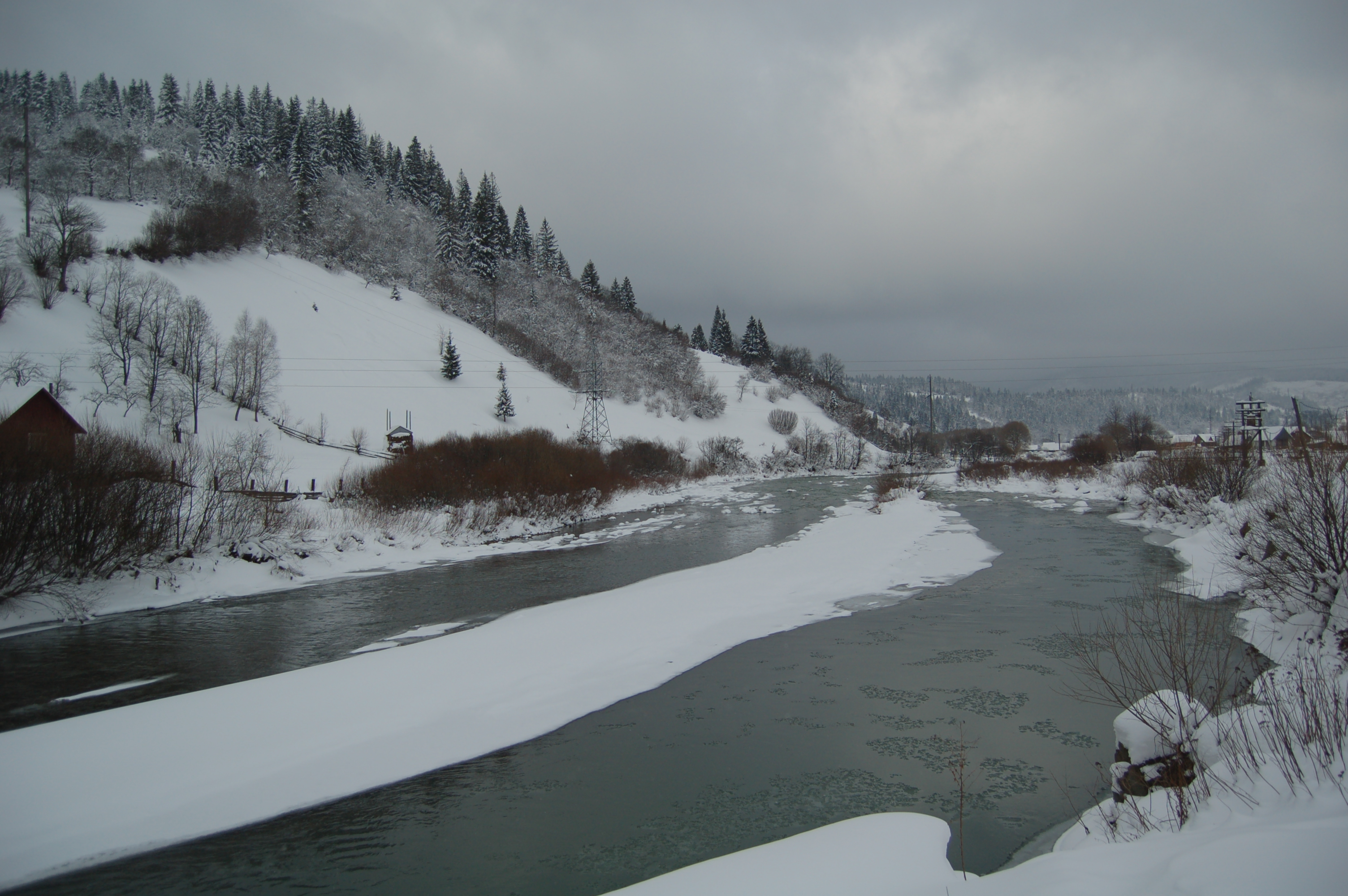
Opir in winter.
