= Tyrawka =

River in Poland

Tyrawka Tyrawski Potok
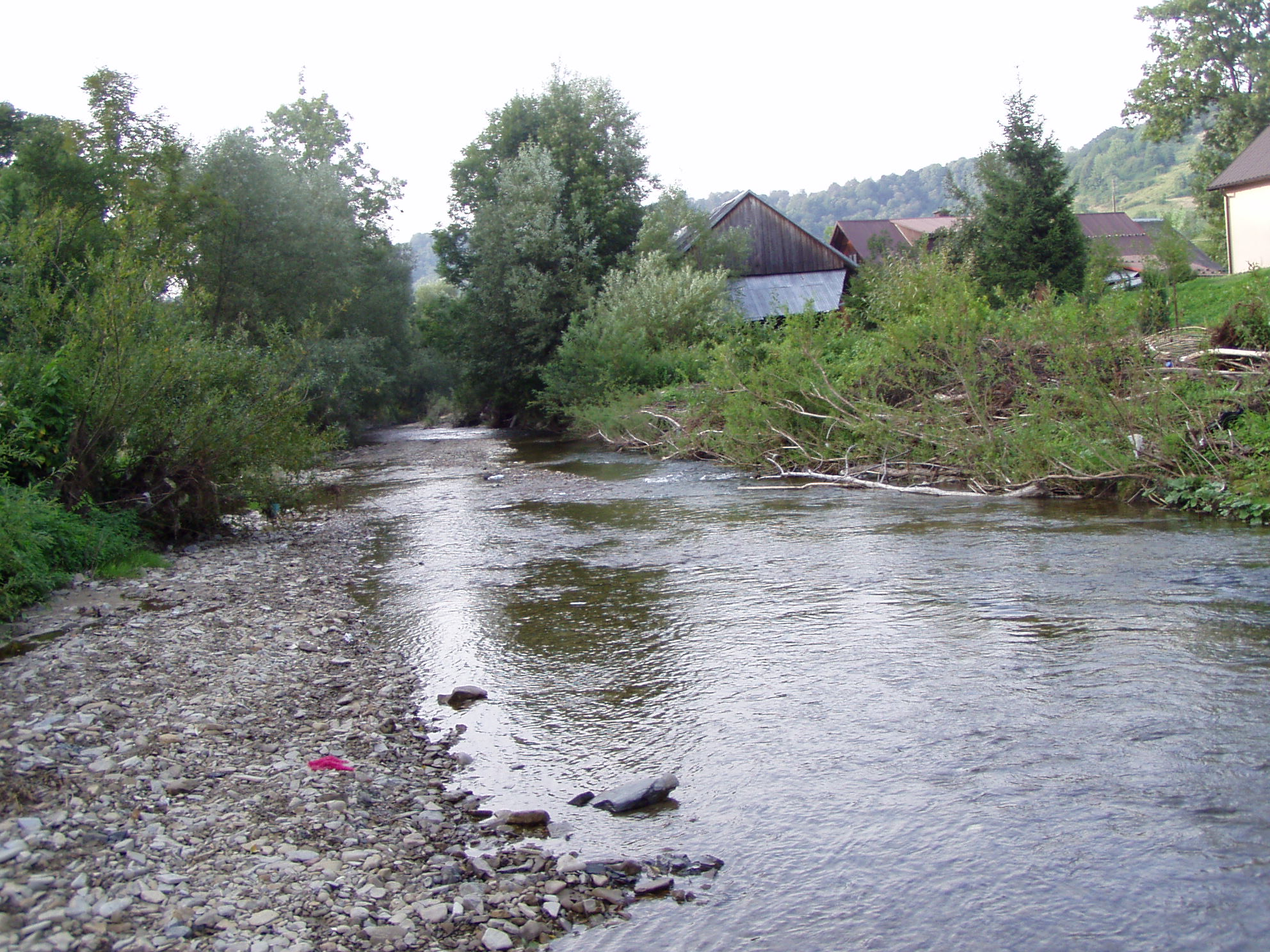

Location
- Country: Poland
- Voivodeship: Podkarpackie

Physical characteristics
- Source
  - location: southeast of Zawadka, Bieszczady County
  - coordinates: 49°32′44″N 22°28′58″E
  - elevation: 632 m (2,073 ft)
- Mouth: San
  - location: northwest of Tyrawa Solna, Sanok County
  - coordinates: 49°36′52″N 22°16′22″E
  - elevation: 272 m (892 ft)
- Length: 23 km (14 mi)
- Basin size: 127 km^{2} (49 mi^{2})

Basin features
- Progression: San→ Vistula→ Baltic Sea

Tyrawka (also: Tyrawski Potok) is a right tributary of the San River in southeastern Poland. It is 23 kilometres long, and flows into the San near Tyrawa Solna.
