= Bukowa (San) =

Location
- Country: Poland

Physical characteristics
- Mouth
  - location: San
  - coordinates: 50°36′12″N 22°04′01″E

Basin features
- Progression: San→ Vistula→ Baltic Sea

Bukowa is a right tributary of the river San in southeastern Poland. It flows for 52 kilometres and joins the San near Stalowa Wola.
