= Łęg Rokietnicki =

Location
- Country: Poland

Physical characteristics
- Mouth
  - location: San
  - coordinates: 49°59′36″N 22°46′45″E

Basin features
- Progression: San→ Vistula→ Baltic Sea

Łęg Rokietnicki is a river of Poland, a left tributary of the San near Jarosław.
