= Stupnica (Leskovac) =

Stupnica Ступница
- Village
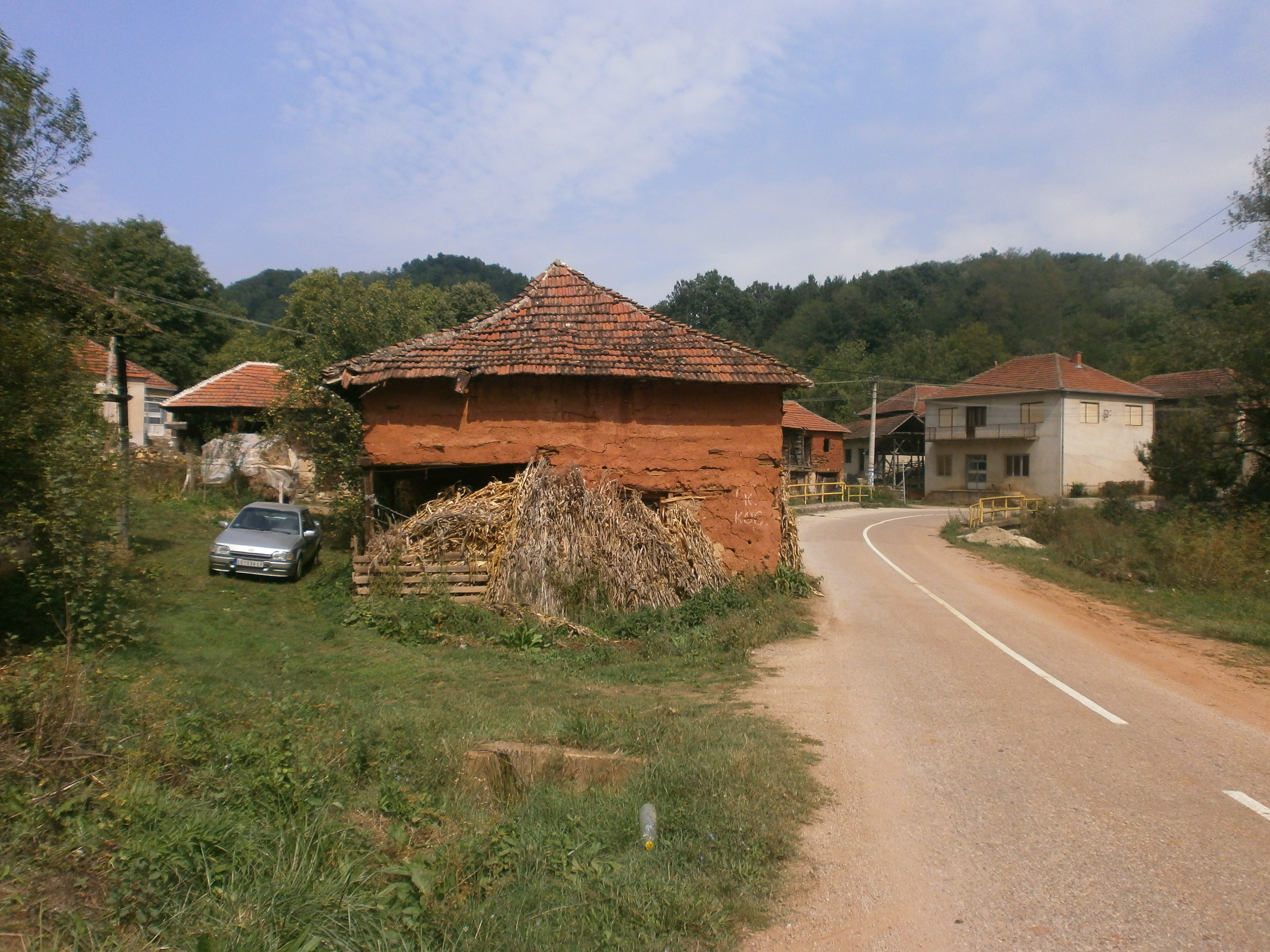

- Location within Serbia
- Coordinates: 43°04′58″N 22°07′18″E
- Country: Serbia
- District: Jablanica District
- Municipality: Leskovac

Population (2002)
  - Total: 402
- Time zone: UTC+1 (CET)
  - Summer (DST): UTC+2 (CEST)

Stupnica is a village in the municipality of Leskovac, Serbia. According to the 2002 census, the village has a population of 402 people.
