= Hrebeniv =

Village in Lviv Oblast, Ukraine

Hrebeniv Гребенів
- Village
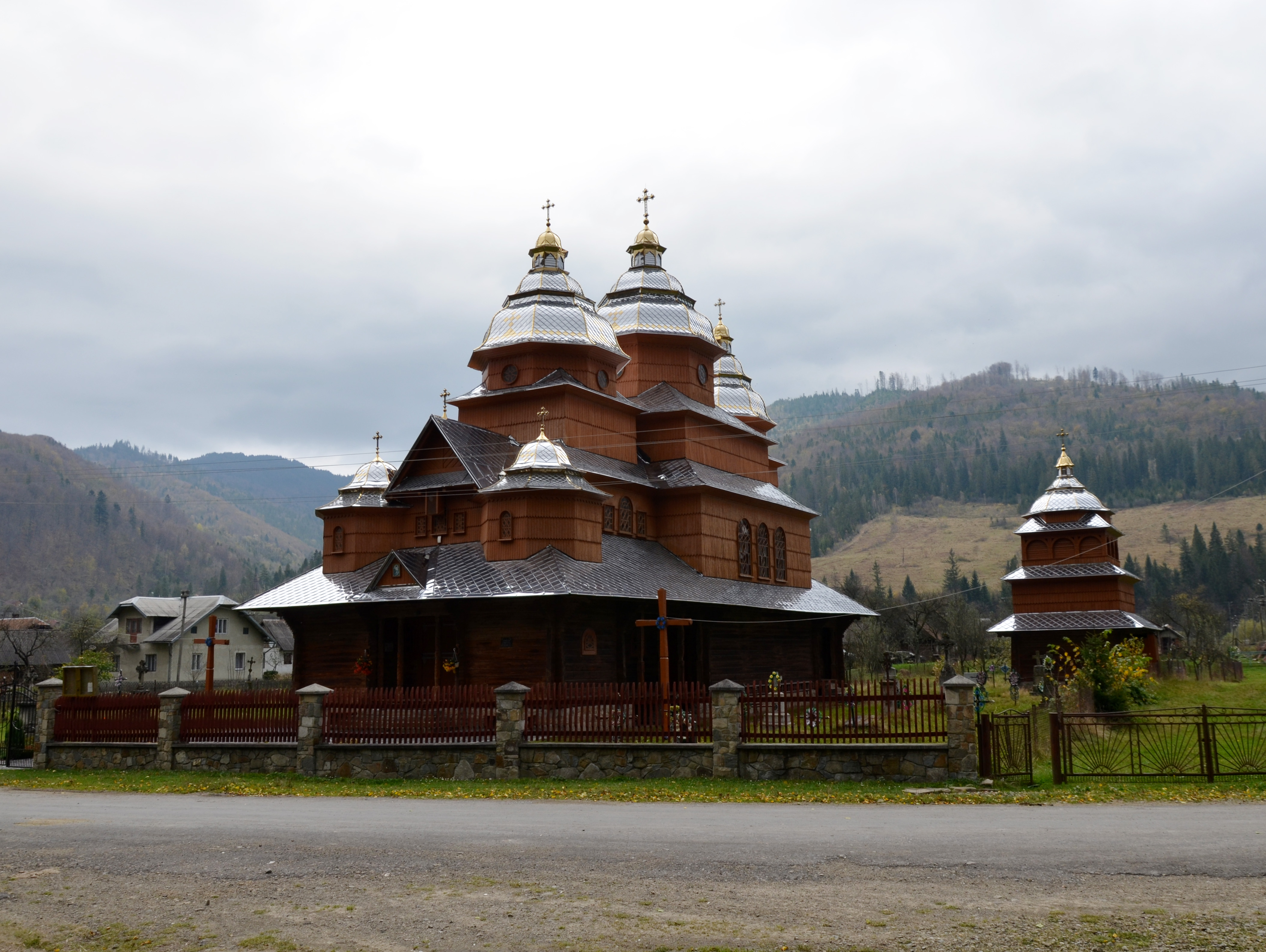
- Annunciation Church in Hrebeniv

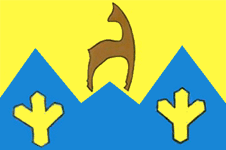
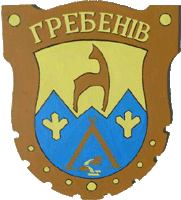
- Flag Coat of arms

- Location within Lviv Oblast
- Coordinates: 48°58′32″N 23°28′25″E
- Country: Ukraine
- Oblast: Lviv Oblast
- District: Stryi Raion
- Established: 1100

Area
  - Total: 104 km^{2} (40 sq mi)
- Elevation /(average value of): 489 m (1,604 ft)

Population
  - Total: 593
  - Density: 5.70/km^{2} (14.8/sq mi)
- Time zone: UTC+2 (EET)
  - Summer (DST): UTC+3 (EEST)
- Postal code: 82634
- Area code: +380 3251
- Website: село Гребенів, райцентр Сколе ^{(Ukrainian)}

Hrebeniv (Ukrainian: Гребе́нів, Polish: Hrebenów) is a Carpathian village in Stryi Raion, Lviv Oblast of Western Ukraine. It belongs to the Skole urban hromada, one of the hromadas of Ukraine. The village has a population of about 593 people. The local government is administered by the Hrebenivska village council.

== Geography ==
The village is located on the banks of the Opir River in the region of High Beskids, at an altitude of 489 metres (1,600 ft) above sea level. It is located at a distance of 4 kilometres (2.5 mi) from the Highway M06 (Ukraine) ( M 06), 119 kilometres (74 mi) from the regional centre of Lviv, 11 kilometres (6.8 mi) from the district centre Skole and 20 kilometres (12 mi) from the urban village Slavske.

== History ==
The first mention of the village is in the studies of the Polish historian and ethnographer Jabłonowski in 1589. Archaeological remains weapons, and other artifacts from the 11th-12th centuries have been discovered by archaeologists in the area.

Known as a resort village, during Soviet times Hrebeniv was part of the Slavske district. Until 18 July 2020, Hrebeniv belonged to Skole Raion. The raion was abolished in July 2020 as part of the administrative reform of Ukraine, which reduced the number of raions of Lviv Oblast to seven. The area of Skole Raion was merged into Stryi Raion.

== Attractions ==
The tomb of Prince Svyatoslav Vladimirovich (982 – 1015) is near Hrebeniv village, on the right bank of the Opir River.
The village has two architectural monuments of local importance to Stryi Raion:

1. Church of the Annunciation of the Blessed Virgin Mary (wooden) 1928 (N- 2911 / 1M).
2. The bell tower of the church of the Annunciation of the Blessed Virgin Mary 1928 (N- 2911 / 2M).
Archival views of the town

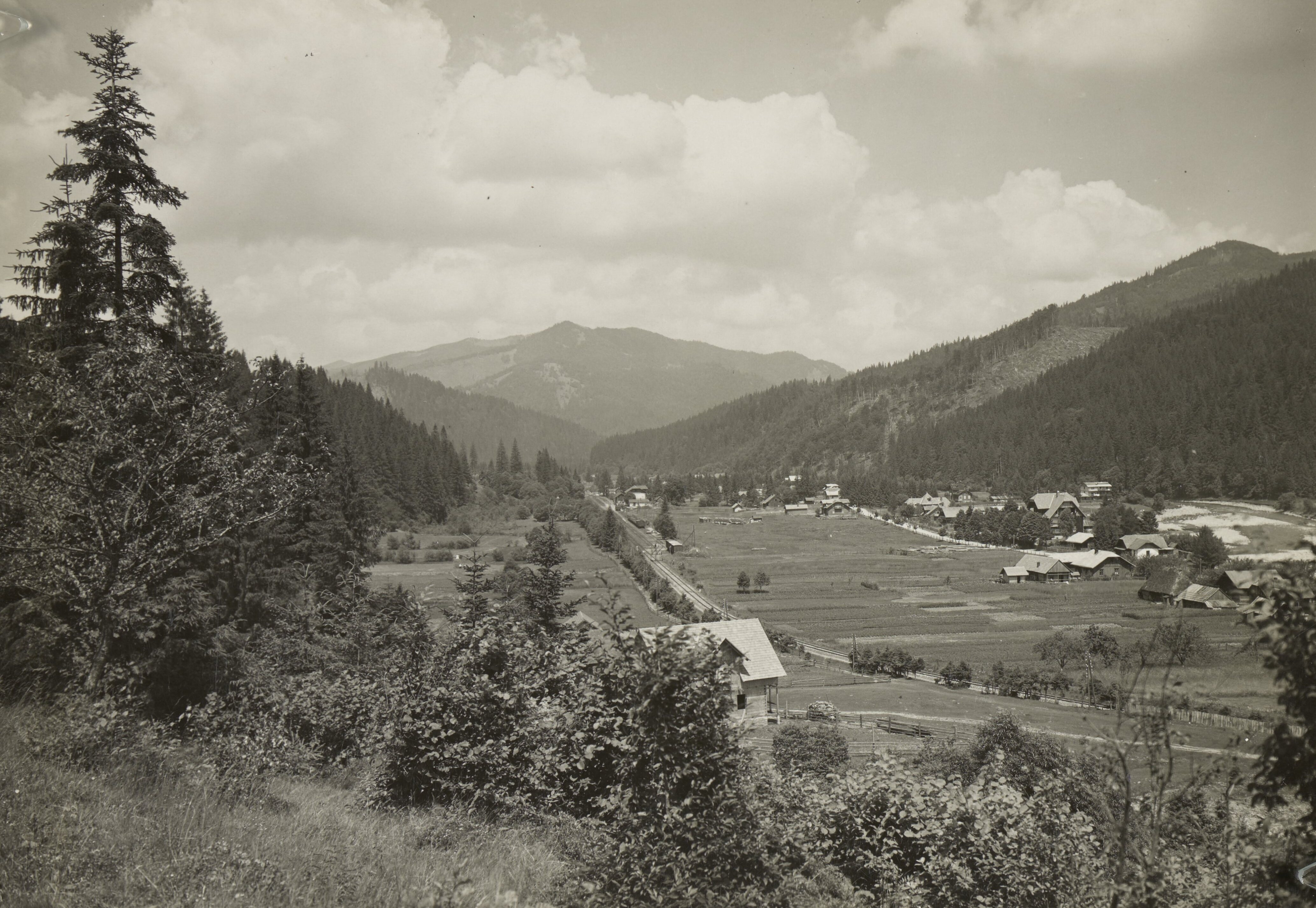
Hrebenów, circa 1938

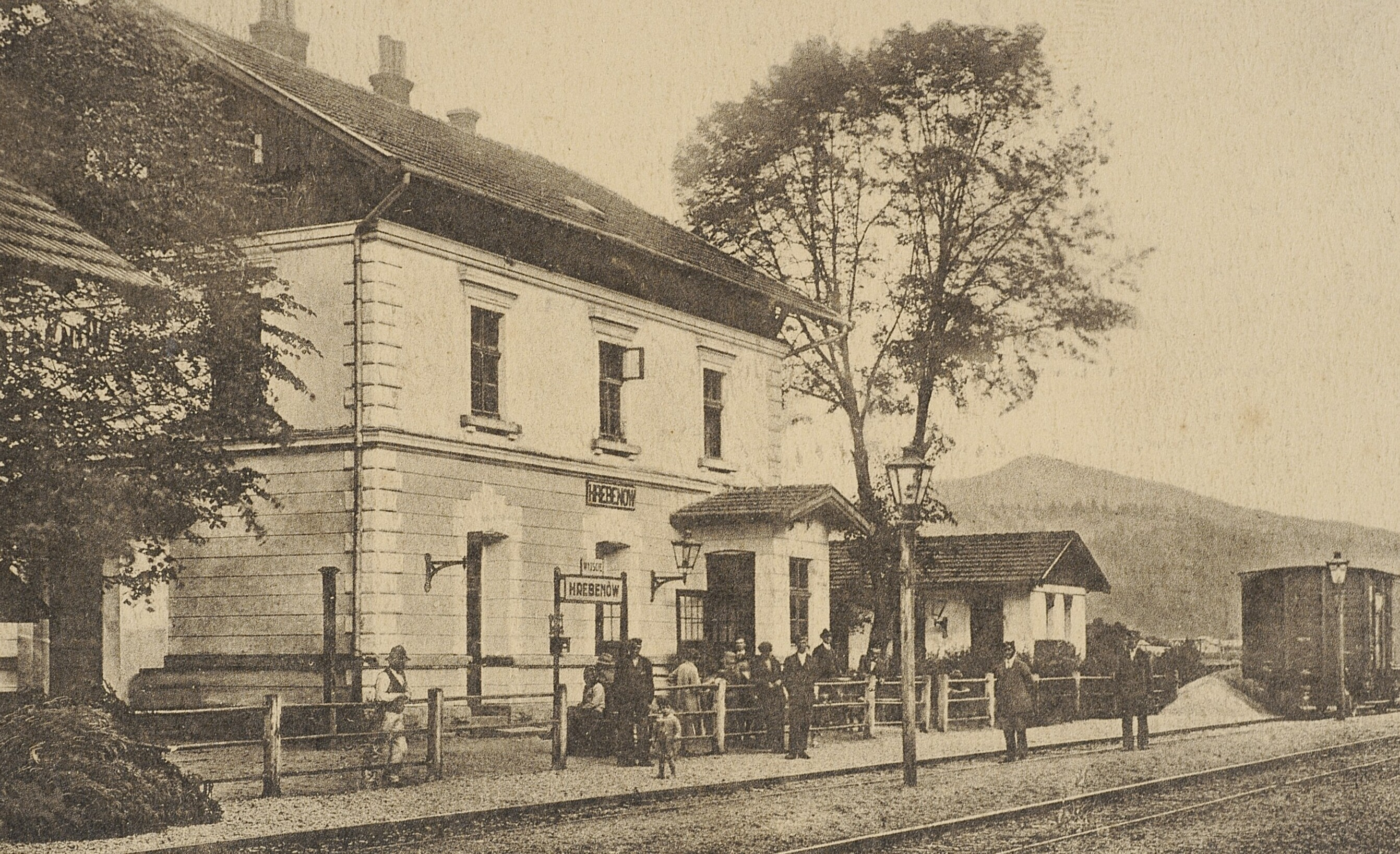
Railway station, before 1929

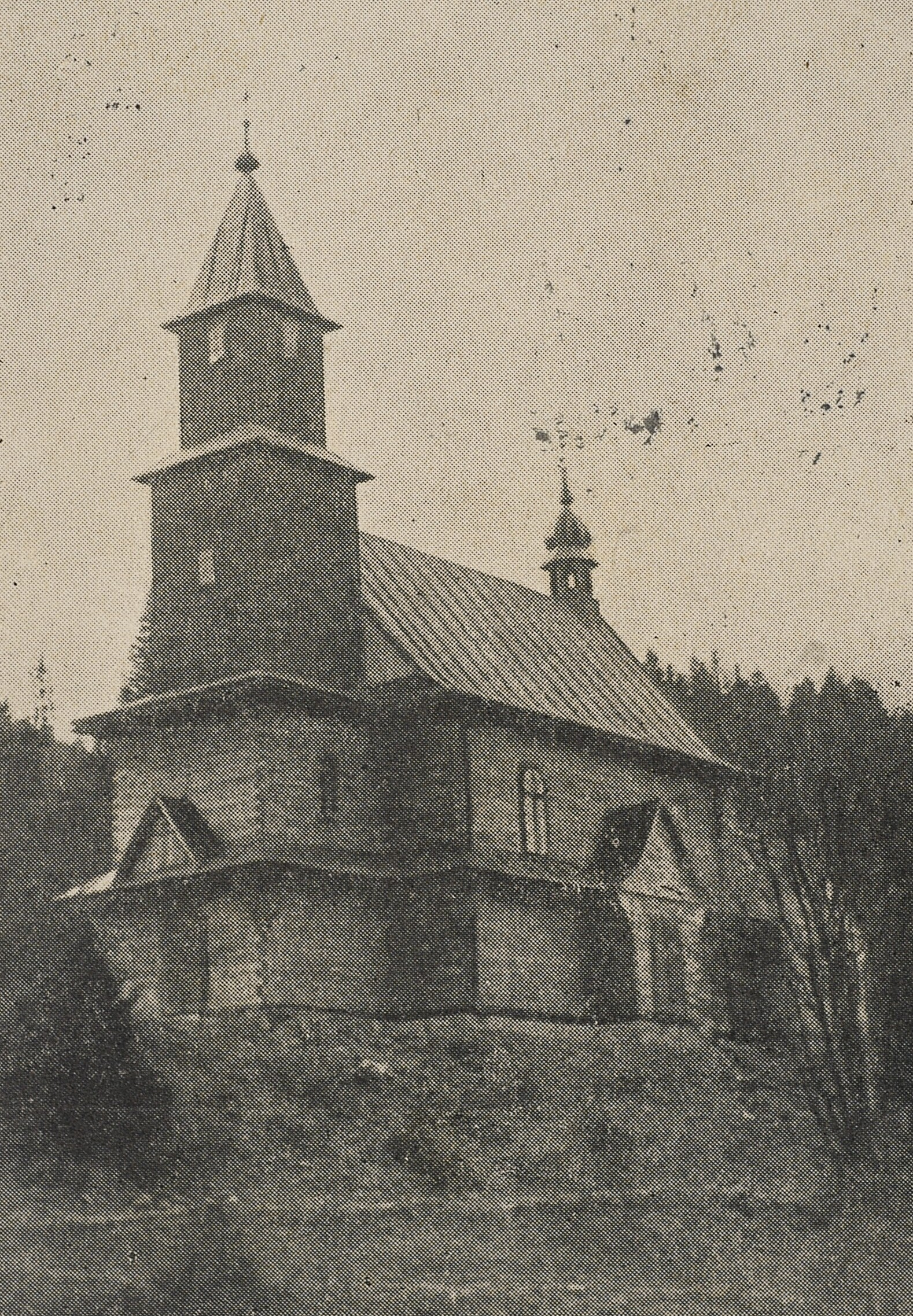
The Roman Catholic Church before World War II

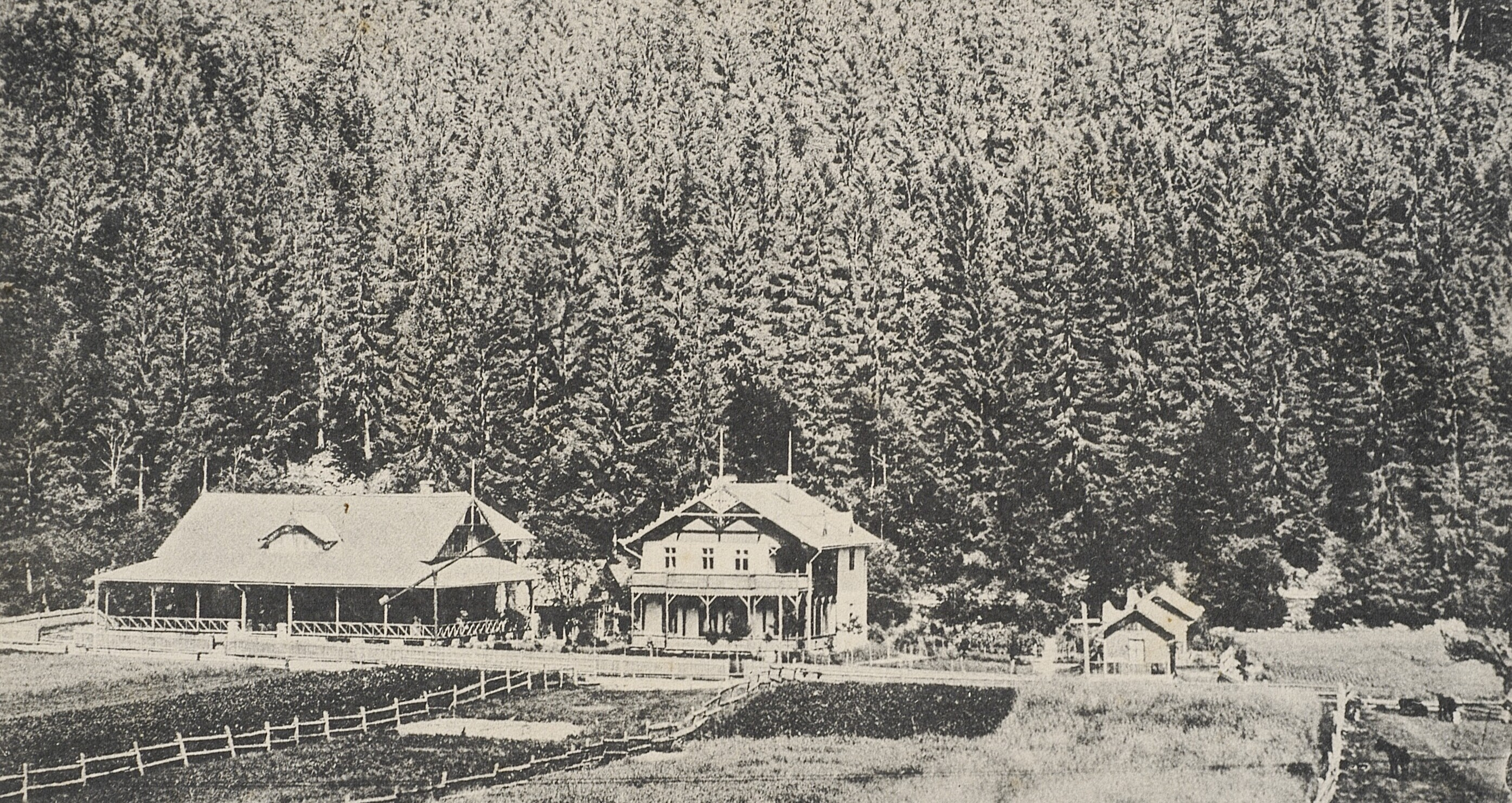
Gliński Sanatorium, before 1906
