= Tyrawa Solna =

- Village
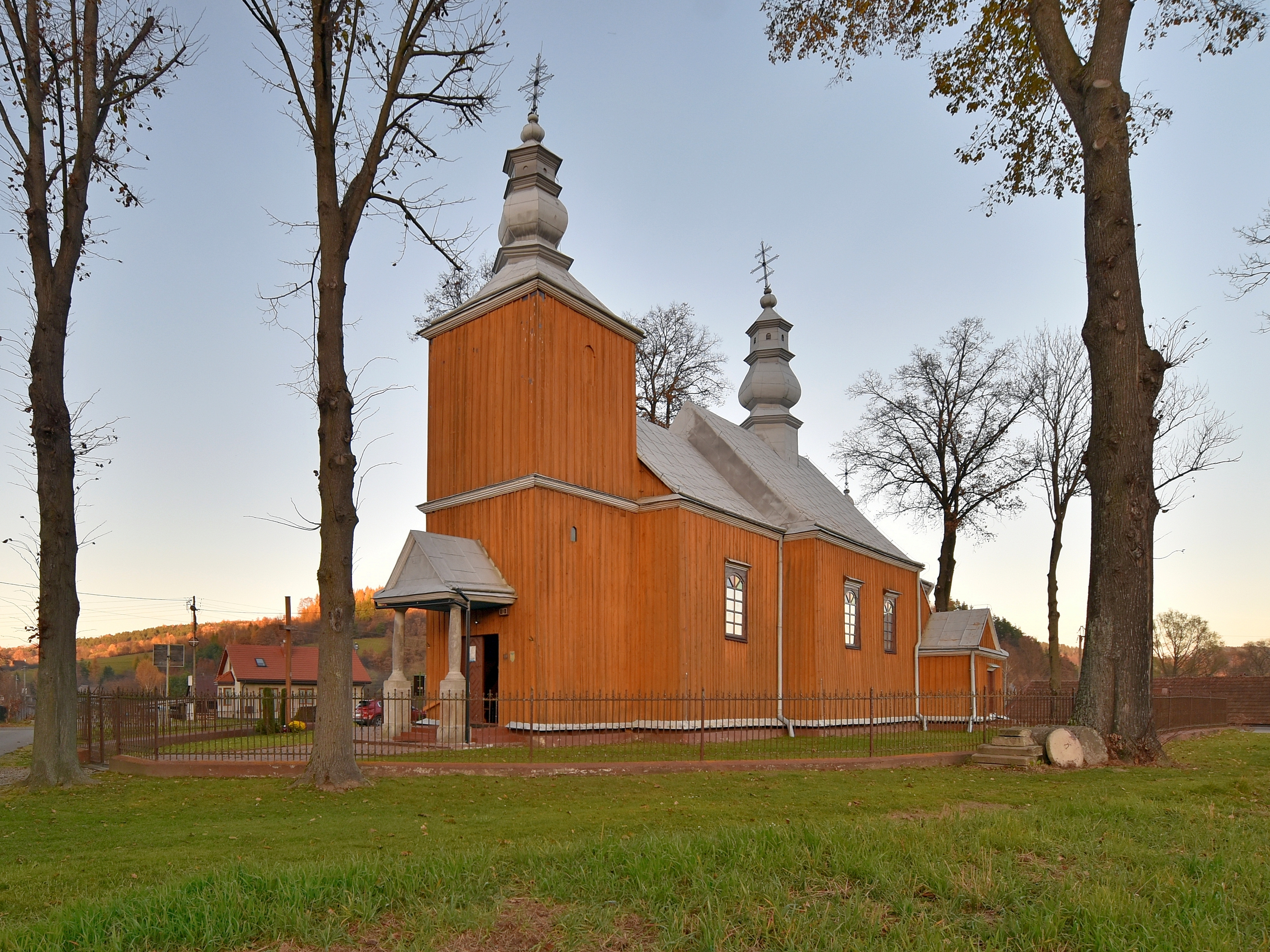
- Church of Saint John the Baptist

- Location within Poland
- Coordinates: 49°37′N 22°17′E
- Country: Poland
- Voivodeship: Subcarpathian
- County: Sanok
- Gmina: Sanok

Population
  - Total: 350

Tyrawa Solna [tɨˈrava ˈsɔlna] is a village in the administrative district of Gmina Sanok, within Sanok County, Subcarpathian Voivodeship, in south-eastern Poland.
