= Stupnica (river) =

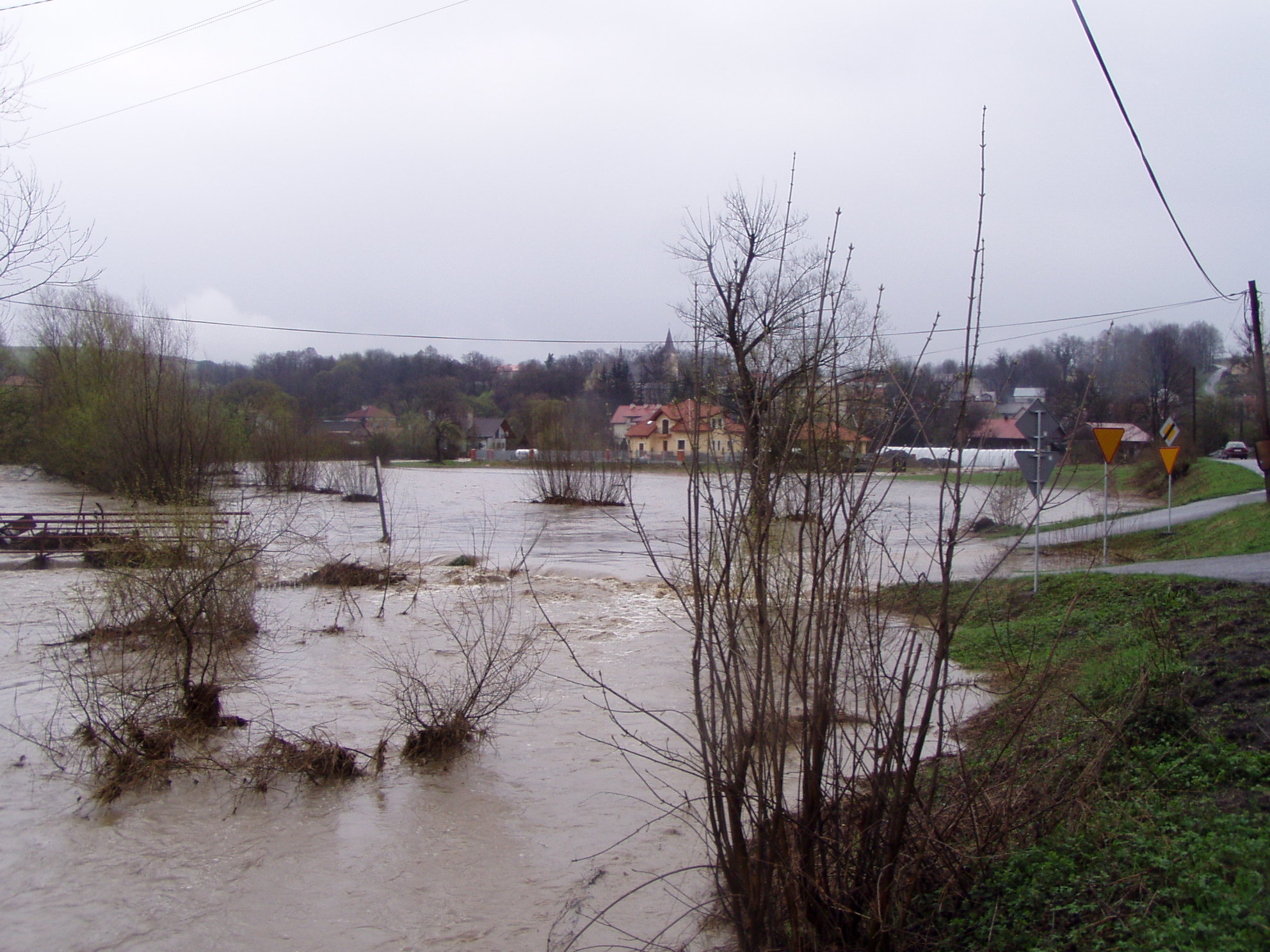

Location
- Country: Poland

Physical characteristics
- Mouth
  - location: San
  - coordinates: 49°46′50″N 22°28′57″E

Basin features
- Progression: San→ Vistula→ Baltic Sea

Stupnica is a right tributary of the San River in southeastern Poland. Its length is roughly 28 kilometres. It joins the San near Bachów.
