= San (river) =

River in Poland and Ukraine

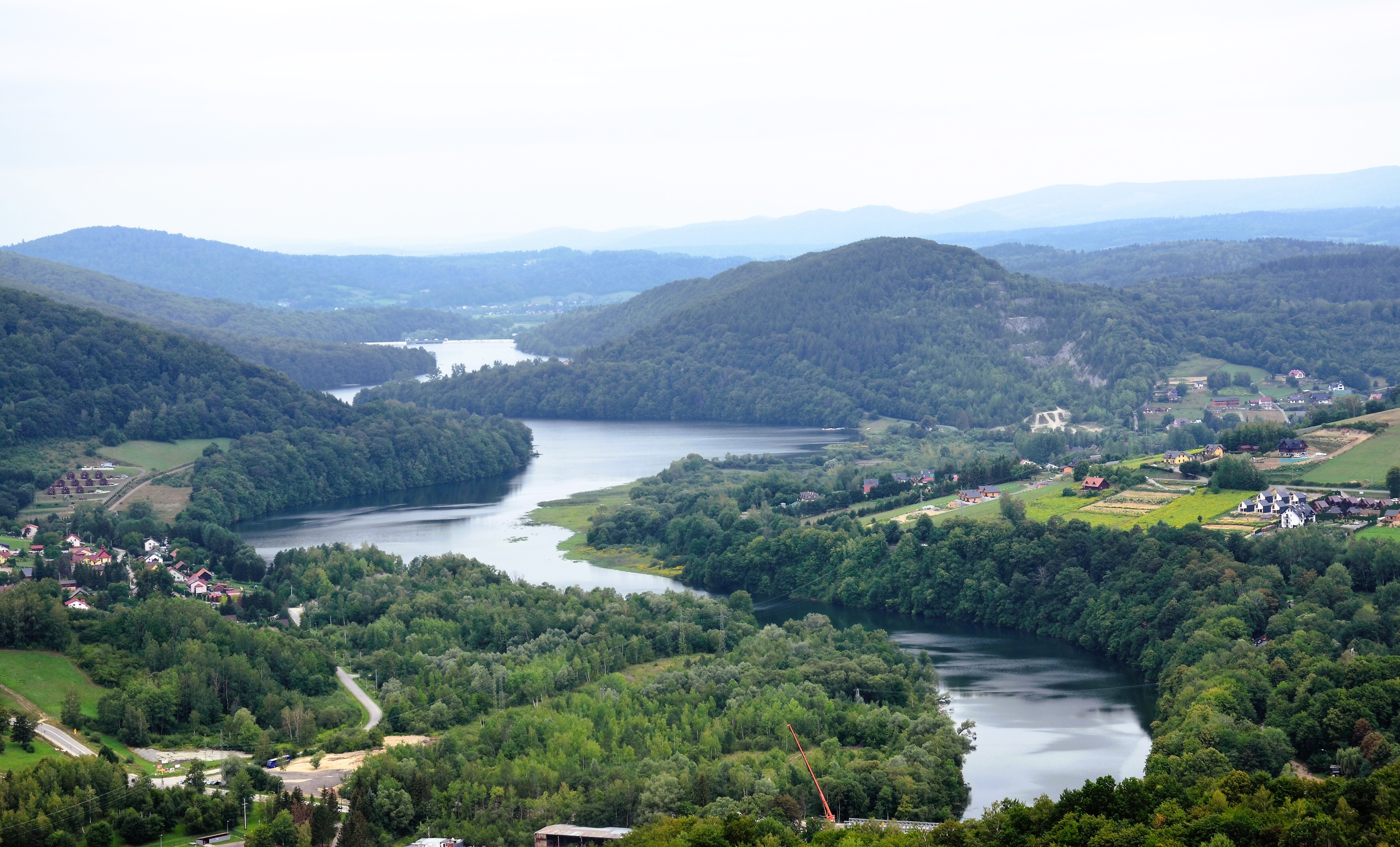
- San River in Solina

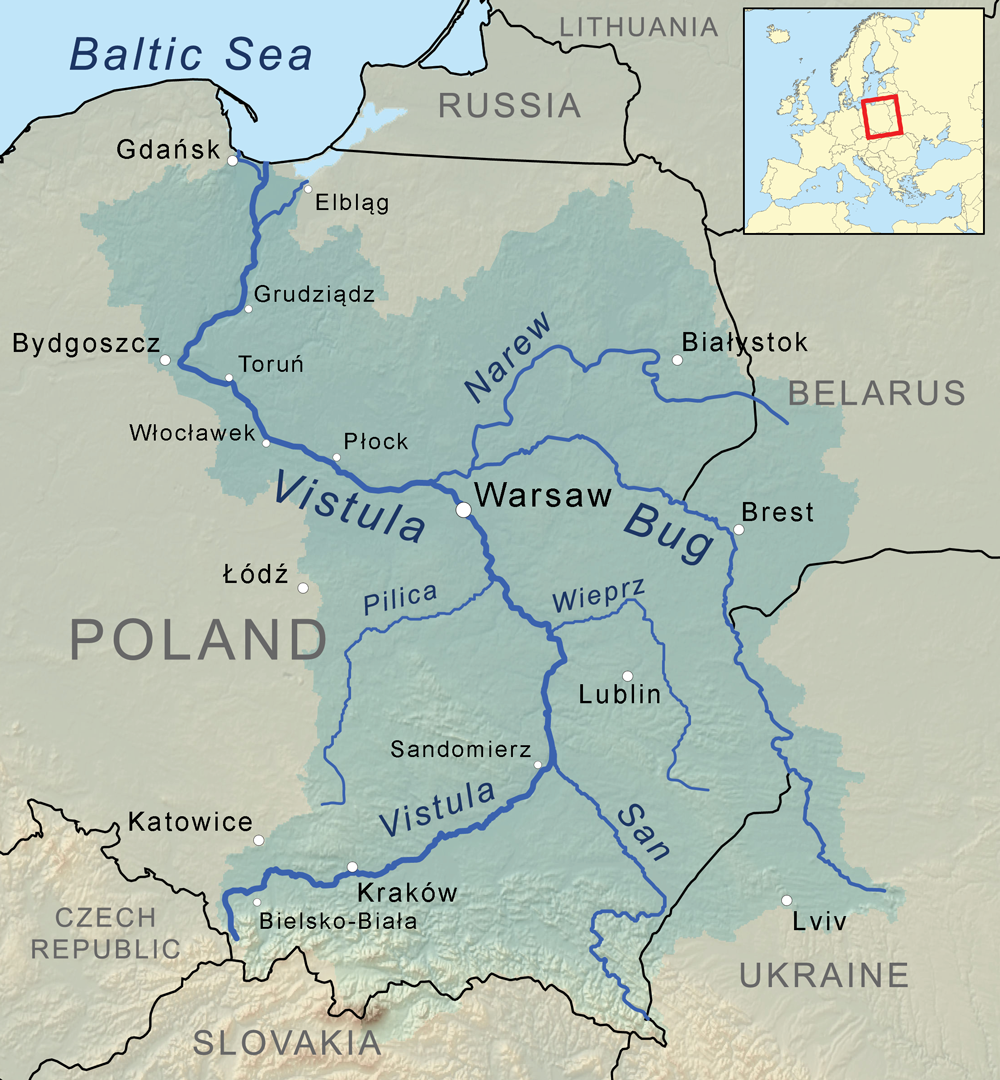
- San River in Vistula watershed

Location
- Country: Poland (457 km), Ukraine (1 km)
- Cities: Lesko, Sanok, Przemyśl, Jarosław, Stalowa Wola

Physical characteristics
- Source: Uzhok Pass
  - location: Piniashkovy Mount, Bukovec Mountains, Ukraine
  - coordinates: 49°00′19″N 22°52′43″E
  - elevation: 900 m (3,000 ft)
- Mouth: Vistula
  - location: Dąbrówka Pniowska, Sandomierz Basin, Poland
  - coordinates: 50°44′15″N 21°50′43″E
- Length: 458 km (285 mi), S → N
- Basin size: 16,877 km^{2} (6,516 sq mi)
- Discharge
  - average: 129 m^{3}/s (4,600 cu ft/s)

Basin features
- Progression: Vistula→ Baltic Sea

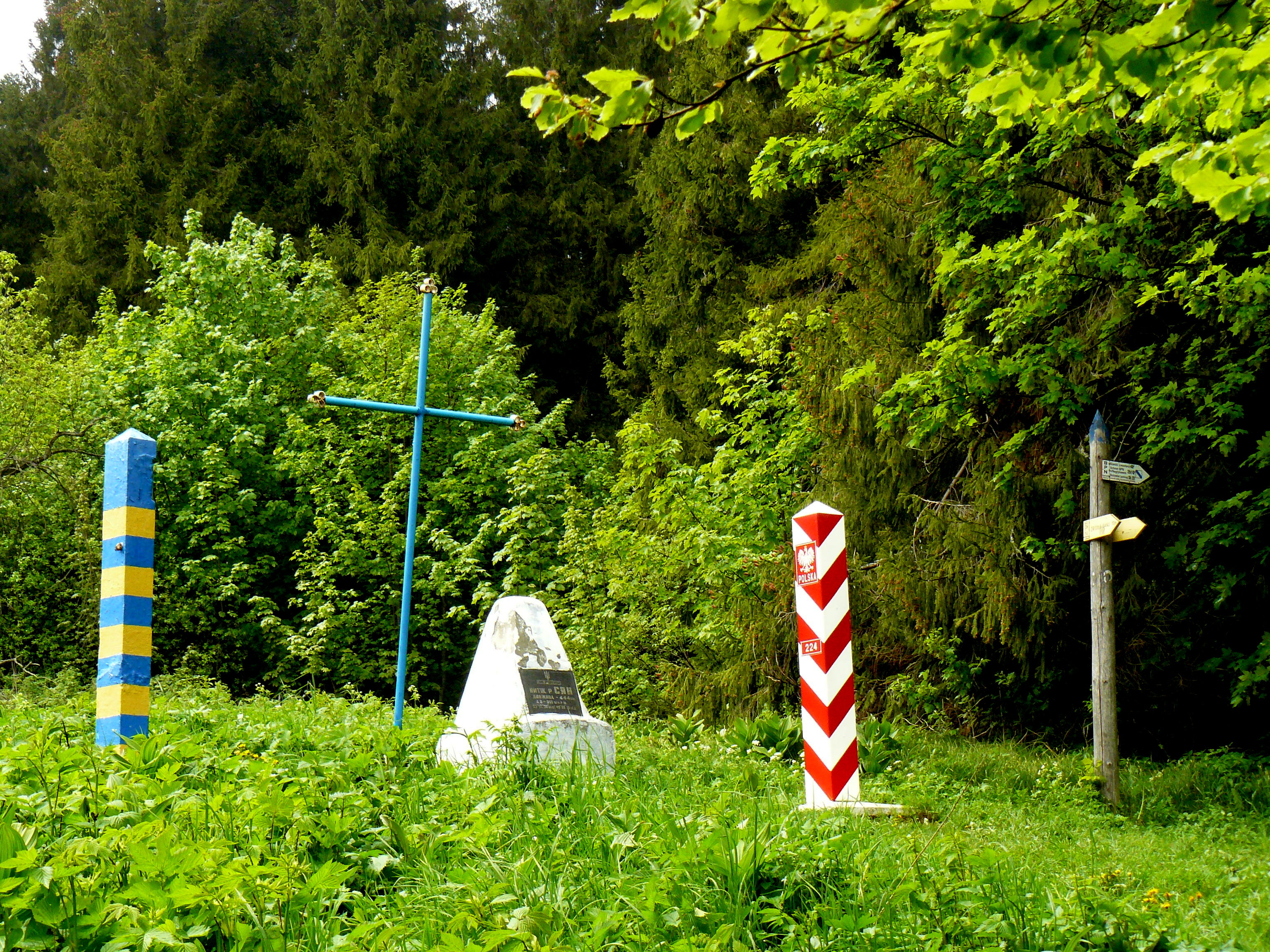
Monument erected at the spring of San river, on Ukrainian-Polish border.

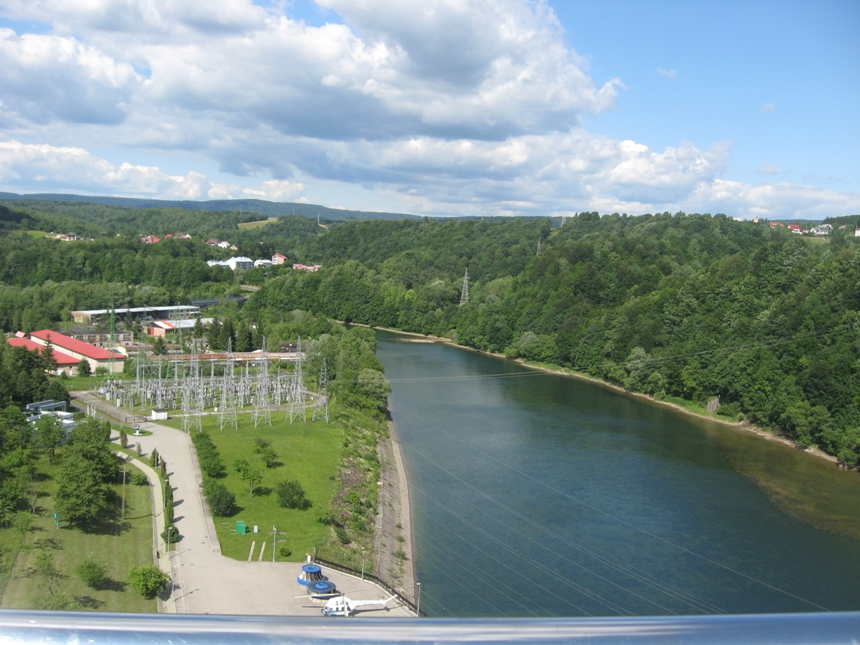
Outflow from Lake Solina

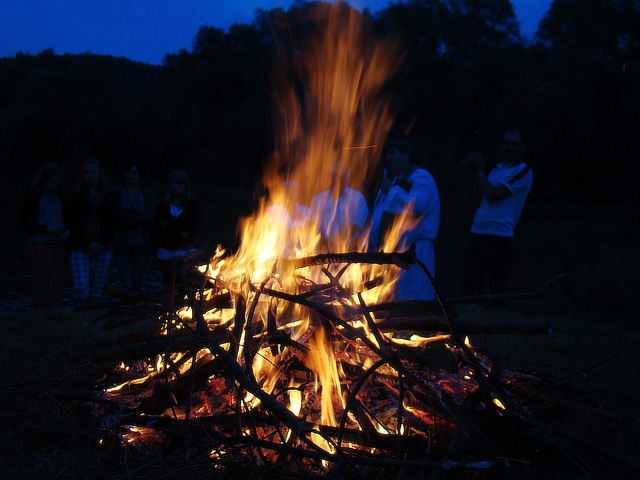
Midsummer fire (Sobótka) at San river

The San (Polish: San; Ukrainian: Сян, romanized: Sian; German: Saan) is a river in southeastern Poland and western Ukraine. It is a tributary of the river Vistula. With a length of 458 kilometres (285 mi), the San is the 6th-longest Polish river. It has a basin area of 16,877 km^{2}, of which 14,426 km^{2} is in Poland. It is also one of Europe's last semi-wild large rivers, as unlike most major European rivers, the San is relatively unregulated, especially in its upper course. Some stretches even retain its natural meanders, and seasonal flooding patterns, because it flows through the mostly sparesely populated Bieszczady region, which makes it also a great place for the fauna and flora to live and settle, creating a lot of biodiversity compared to other large rivers in Europe.

== Etymology ==
*San in proto-Indo-European languages means 'speed' or 'rapid stream'. In Celtic languages, san means 'river'.

== Course ==
The San arises in the Carpathian Mountains near the village of Sianky, at an elevation of 900 metres (3,000 ft), exactly on the Polish-Ukrainian border (49°00′10″N 22°52′30″E) and on the continental watershed, and forms the border between Poland and Ukraine for approximately its first 50 km (31 mi). Poland's largest artificial lake, Lake Solina, was created by a dam on the San River near Lesko.

The San flows into the Vistula near Sandomierz.

== Tributaries ==
Left tributaries

1. Wołosaty
2. Solinka
3. Hoczewka
4. Osława
5. Sanoczek
6. Baryczka
7. Wisłok

Right tributaries

1. Czarna
2. Olszanka
3. Tyrawka
4. Stupnica
5. Wiar
6. Vyshnia
7. Rada
8. Shklo
9. Lubaczówka
10. Lubienia
11. Trzebośnica
12. Tanew
13. Bukowa

== History of the region ==
Historical records first mention the river in 1097 as Sanъ, reku Sanъ, k Sanovi; then as nad Sanomъ (1152) and Sanu (1287). On the old maps of the Ruthenian Voivodeship, Poland 1339–1772 it was referred to as "San" (1339), San (1372), "Szan" (1406), "Sanok" (1438), "Saan" (1439), "Sayn" (1445), "San" (1467), "Szan" (1517), and "Schan" (1526).

Humans had first settled the southeastern region of present-day Poland (the Subcarpathian Voivodeship or Podkarpacie) in prehistoric times. In the pre-Roman era various tribes, including the Celts, Goths and Vandals (Przeworsk culture and Puchov culture) overran the area. After the fall of the Roman Empire, Hungarians and Slavs invaded the area.

The San valley must have become an important trade-route and axis of human settlement as early as the 9th or 10th century. The region subsequently became part of the Great Moravian state. Upon the invasion of the Hungarian tribes into the heart of the Great Moravian Empire around 899, the Lendians of the area declared their allegiance to the Hungarian Empire. The region then became a site of contention between Poland, Kievan Rus and Hungary starting in around the 9th century. This area was mentioned for the first time in 981 (by Nestor), when Volodymyr the Great of Kievan Rus took the area over on his way into Poland. In 1018 it returned to Poland, in 1031 reverted to Rus, and in 1340 was recovered by Casimir III of Poland.

During the years 966–1018, 1340–1772 (the Ruthenian Voivodeship) and 1918–1939, the region was part of Poland. Between 1772 and 1918 it belonged to the Austrian Empire, which became the Austro-Hungarian empire when the double monarchy was introduced. This region, including the area west and east of the Subcarpathian Voivodship, was controlled by Austria for almost 120 years. During that time it was known as Galicia.

Ukrainians traditionally associated the San with their ethnographic western frontier: this is reflected in the State Anthem of Ukraine (which describes Ukraine as extending from the San to the Don) and the March of Ukrainian Nationalists (which calls for a Ukraine from the San to the Caucasus). The Poland–Ukraine border today follows the San for approximately the first 50 km of its course.

The San River, which has seen many battles in its history, was a battle site at the beginning of World War II in 1939. At the outset of the German invasion of Poland, Polish forces attempted to defend a line along the San from September 6, until German forces broke out of their bridgeheads on September 12. It turned out as being a really innefective front line, and it is an example of terrain overestimation in military planning, as water levels were extremely low at the time of the year, and it could be crossed by foot, so even after destroying the bridges, the Germans were only slowed down by a few hours.

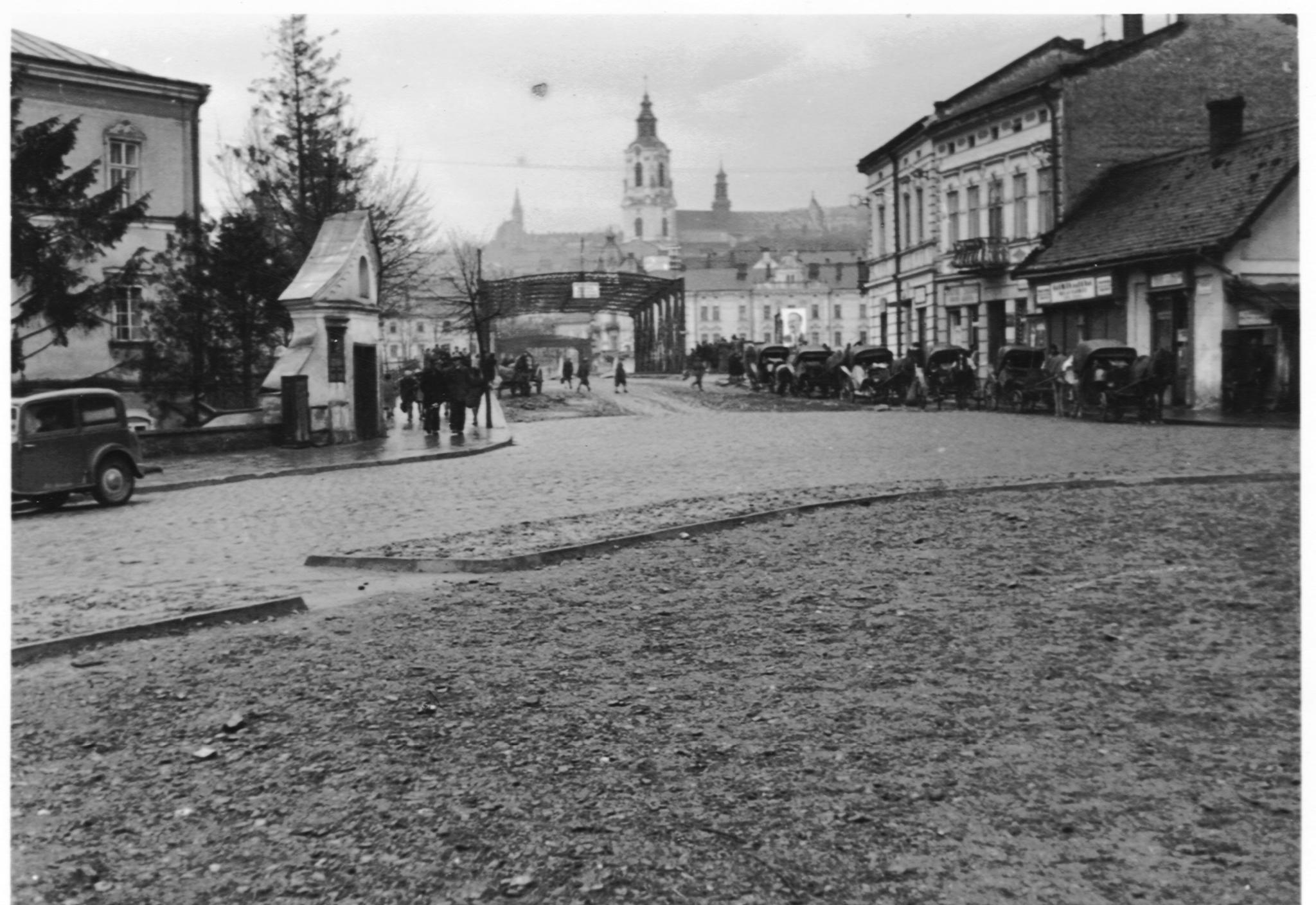
German-occupied left-bank Przemyśl with Soviet-occupied right-bank Przemyśl in the background (World War II)

== Cities ==
- Dubiecko, Dynów, Jarosław, Lesko, Leżajsk, Nisko, Przemyśl, Radymno, Rudnik nad Sanem, Sandomierz, Sanok, Sieniawa, Stalowa Wola, Ulanów, Zagórz

== See also ==
- Łęg Rokietnicki
- Rivers of Poland
- San dialect
- Walddeutsche

== Literature ==
- Geographical Dictionary of the Kingdom of Poland and other Slavic Lands Słownik geograficzny Królestwa Polskiego i innych krajów słowiańskich. tom. X, pages 260 - 263. Warszawa. 1876. (digital edition)
